= Horizon League baseball tournament =

Horizon League Baseball Championship
- Sport: Baseball
- Conference: Horizon League
- Number of teams: 6
- Format: Modified double-elimination
- Current stadium: Number 1 seed hosts
- Current location: Number 1 seed hosts
- Played: 1981–present
- Last contest: 2026
- Current champion: Milwaukee (5)
- Most championships: Wright State (11)

The Horizon League Baseball Championship is the conference baseball tournament of the NCAA Division I Horizon League. Through the 2025 season, all Horizon League baseball teams participated in the modified double-elimination tournament, which is hosted by the regular season champion of the league. The winner of the tournament receives an automatic berth to the NCAA Division I Baseball Championship.

== Champions ==
=== By year ===
The following is a list of conference champions and sites listed by year.

Year	Program	Site	Most Valuable Player	NCAA Tournament Result
1981	Oral Roberts	Tulsa, OK		Runners-up, Midwest Regional
1982	Oral Roberts	James K. Campbell Athletic Complex • Detroit, MI		Winless, Midwest Regional
1983	Oral Roberts	Tulsa, OK		Runners-up, Midwest Regional
1984	Oklahoma City	Cincinnati, OH		Runners-up, Midwest Regional
1985	Oral Roberts	Tulsa, OK		2nd round, Midwest Regional
1986	Oral Roberts	James K. Campbell Athletic Complex • Detroit, MI		2nd round, Mideast Regional
1987	Oral Roberts	Bosse Field • Evansville, IN		Runners-up, West I Regional
1988	Evansville	Stanley Coveleski Regional Stadium • South Bend, IN		2nd round, West II Regional
1989	Notre Dame	Stanley Coveleski Regional Stadium • South Bend, IN		3rd round, West II Regional
1990	Evansville	Stanley Coveleski Regional Stadium • South Bend, IN		Did not qualify
1991	Notre Dame	Stanley Coveleski Regional Stadium • South Bend, IN		Did not qualify
1992	Notre Dame	Stanley Coveleski Regional Stadium • South Bend, IN	Chris Michalak, Notre Dame	Runners-up, Atlantic Regional
1993	Notre Dame	Stanley Coveleski Regional Stadium • South Bend, IN	Eric Danapolis, Notre Dame	Runners-up, East Regional
1994	Notre Dame	Frank Eck Stadium • South Bend, IN	Tom Price, Notre Dame	Runners-up, East Regional
1995	Wright State	Frank Eck Stadium • South Bend, IN	Kris Jarosz, Wright State	Did not qualify
1996	Northern Illinois	Bush Stadium • Indianapolis, IN	Jason King, Northern Illinois	Did not qualify
1997	Detroit	Wright Stadium • Dayton, OH	Dusty Beam, Wright State	Did not qualify
1998	Butler	Les Miller Field • Chicago, IL	Eric Storey, Butler	Did not qualify
1999	Milwaukee	Les Miller Field • Chicago, IL	Chad Sadowski, Milwaukee	2nd round, Lubbock Regional
2000	Butler	Nischwitz Stadium • Dayton, OH	Jeremy Sinsabaugh, Butler	Winless, Minneapolis Regional
2001	Milwaukee	Les Miller Field • Chicago, IL	Scott Gillitzer, Milwaukee	Winless, South Bend Regional
2002	Milwaukee	Jacobs Field • Cleveland, OH	Dave Pudlosky, Milwaukee	Winless, Lincoln Regional
2003	UIC	Nischwitz Stadium • Dayton, OH	Mike Hughes, UIC	Winless, Palo Alto Regional
2004	Youngstown State	Eastwood Field • Niles, OH	Justin Banks, Youngstown State	Winless, Austin Regional
2005	UIC	Victory Field • Indianapolis, IN	Ryan Zink, UIC	Winless, Lincoln Regional
2006	Wright State	Nischwitz Stadium • Dayton, OH	Ross Oeder, Wright State	Winless, Corvallis Regional
2007	UIC	Les Miller Field • Chicago, IL	David Cales, UIC	2nd round, Long Beach Regional
2008	UIC	Eastwood Field • Niles, OH	Brett Schaefer, UIC	2nd round, College Station Regional
2009	Wright State	The Pipe Yard • Lorain, OH	Kory Twede, Wright State	Winless, Ft. Worth Regional
2010	Milwaukee	U.S. Steel Yard • Gary, IN	Chad Pierce, Milwaukee	Winless, Tempe Regional
2011	Wright State	Nischwitz Stadium • Dayton, OH	Zach Tanner, Wright State	Winless, College Station Regional
2012	Valparaiso	Les Miller Field • Chicago, IL	Mark Johnson, Valpraiso	Winless, Gary Regional
2013	Valparaiso	Eastwood Field • Youngstown, OH	Karch Kowalczyk, Valparaiso	2nd round, Bloomington Regional
2014	Youngstown State	Kapco Park • Milwaukee, WI	Phil Lipari, Youngstown State	2nd round, Bloomington Regional
2015	Wright State	Oil City Stadium • Whiting, IN	Mark Fowler, Wright State	Runners-up, Champaign Regional
2016	Wright State	Nischwitz Stadium • Dayton, OH	John Brodner, Wright State	Runners-up, Louisville Regional
2017	UIC	Les Miller Field at Curtis Granderson Stadium • Chicago, IL	David Cronin, UIC	Winless, Hattiesburg Regional
2018	Wright State	Nischwitz Stadium • Dayton, OH	Peyton Burdick, Wright State	Winless, Stanford Regional
2019	UIC	Nischwitz Stadium • Dayton, OH	Ryan Hampe, UIC	Winless, Louisville Regional
2020	Cancelled due to the coronavirus pandemic			
2021	Wright State	Nischwitz Stadium • Dayton, OH	Damon Dues, Wright State	Winless, Knoxville Regional
2022	Wright State	Nischwitz Stadium • Dayton, OH	Zane Harris, Wright State	Winless, Blacksburg Regional
2023	Wright State	Nischwitz Stadium • Dayton, OH	Andrew Patrick, Wright State	Winless, Terre Haute Regional
2024	Northern Kentucky	Nischwitz Stadium • Dayton, OH	Treyvin Moss, Northern Kentucky	Winless, Knoxville Regional
2025	Wright State	Nischwitz Stadium • Dayton, OH	Patrick Fultz, Wright State	Runners-up, Nashville Regional
2026	Milwaukee	Nischwitz Stadium • Dayton, OH	Joey Spence, Milwaukee	Runners-up, Auburn Regional

=== By school ===
The following is a list of conference champions listed by school.

Program	Championships	Years
Wright State	11	1995, 2006, 2009, 2011, 2015, 2016, 2018, 2021, 2022, 2023, 2025
UIC	6	2003, 2005, 2007, 2008, 2017, 2019
Oral Roberts	6	1981, 1982, 1983, 1985, 1986, 1987
Milwaukee	5	1999, 2001, 2002, 2010, 2026
Notre Dame	5	1989, 1991, 1992, 1993, 1994
Youngstown State	2	2004, 2014
Valparaiso	2	2012, 2013
Butler	2	1998, 2000
Evansville	2	1988, 1990
Detroit	1	1997
Northern Illinois	1	1996
Northern Kentucky	1	2024
Oklahoma City	1	1984

- Italics indicate that the program no longer fields a baseball team in the Horizon League.
