= 2011 Horizon League baseball tournament =

- Teams: 6
- Format: Double-elimination
- Finals site: Nischwitz Stadium; Dayton, OH
- Champions: Wright State (4th title)
- Winning coach: Rob Cooper (3rd title)
- MVP: Zach Tanner (Wright State)

2011 Horizon League baseball standings
	Conf.				Overall
Team	W		L	PCT	W		L	PCT
Wright State ‍‍‡‍	16	–	7	.696	36	–	19	.655
UIC ‍‍‍	16	–	7	.696	28	–	26	.519
Milwaukee ‍‍‍	15	–	10	.600	28	–	28	.500
Valparaiso ‍‍‍	14	–	10	.583	25	–	32	.439
Butler ‍‍‍	11	–	14	.440	23	–	28	.451
Youngstown State ‍‍‍	7	–	16	.304	14	–	41	.255
Cleveland State ‍‍‍	5	–	20	.200	12	–	43	.218
‡ – Tournament champion As of May 30, 2011; Rankings from Coaches' Poll

The 2011 Horizon League baseball tournament took place from May 22 through 26, near the close of the 2011 NCAA Division I baseball season. The top six of the league's seven teams met in the double-elimination tournament held at Wright State's Nischwitz Stadium in Dayton, Ohio. Top seeded Wright State won their fourth Horizon League Championship and earned the conference's automatic bid to the 2011 NCAA Division I baseball tournament.

== Seeding ==
The league's six teams are seeded one through six based on winning percentage, using conference games only.

Team	W	L	PCT	GB	Seed
Wright State	16	7	.696	—	1
UIC	16	7	.696	—	2
Milwaukee	15	10	.600	2	3
Valparaiso	14	10	.583	2.5	4
Butler	11	14	.440	6	5
Youngstown State	7	16	.304	9	6
Cleveland State	5	20	.200	12	—

== Results ==
Upper round 1	Upper round 2	Upper final	Final
1	Wright State	12
3	Milwaukee	2	6	Youngstown State	0
6	Youngstown State	4	1	Wright State	4
4	Valparaiso	3
2	UIC	9
4	Valparaiso	9	4	Valparaiso	11
5	Butler	0
1	Wright State	4	—
4	Valparaiso	3	—
Lower round 1	Lower round 2	Lower round 3	Lower final
4	Valparaiso	8
6	Youngstown State	12	6	Youngstown State	6
2	UIC	1	2	UIC	7
3	Milwaukee	5	3	Milwaukee	0
5	Butler	0

== All-Tournament Team ==
The following players were named to the All-Tournament Team.

POS	Name	School
P	Damon McCormick	Valparaiso
P	Michael Schum	Wright State
C	Corey Davis	Wright State
1B	Will Hagel	Valparaiso
2B	Michael Morman	Valparaiso
3B	Zach Tanner	Wright State
SS	Justin Kopale	Wright State
SS	Chris Manning	Valparaiso
OF	Tristan Moore	Wright State
OF	Joe Iacobucci	Youngstown State
OF	Robbie Robinson	Valparaiso

=== Most Valuable Player ===
Zach Tanner was named Most Valuable Player of the Tournament. Tanner was a third baseman for Wright State.
