= 2008 Horizon League baseball tournament =

- Teams: 7
- Format: Double-elimination
- Finals site: Eastwood Field; Niles, Ohio
- Champions: UIC (4th title)
- Winning coach: Mike Dee (4th title)
- MVP: Brett Shaefer (UIC)

2008 Horizon League baseball standings
	Conf.				Overall
Team	W		L	PCT	W		L	PCT
UIC ‍‍‡‍^{y}	17	–	6	.739	35	–	22	.614
Wright State ‍‍‍	16	–	6	.727	30	–	33	.476
Youngstown State ‍‍‍	13	–	12	.520	23	–	33	.411
Cleveland State ‍‍‍	10	–	13	.435	22	–	31	.415
Milwaukee ‍‍‍	11	–	15	.423	25	–	36	.410
Valparaiso ‍‍‍	8	–	13	.381	21	–	35	.375
Butler ‍‍‍	7	–	17	.292	12	–	34	.261
‡ – Tournament champion y – Invited to the NCAA Tournament; As of May 30, 2008; Rankings from Collegiate Baseball

The 2008 Horizon League baseball tournament took place from May 20 through 25, near the close of the 2008 NCAA Division I baseball season. All seven of the league's teams met in the double-elimination tournament held at Eastwood Field in Niles, Ohio. Top seeded UIC won their fourth Horizon League Championship, and second in a row, and earned the conference's automatic bid to the 2008 NCAA Division I baseball tournament.

== Seeding and format ==
The league's seven teams are seeded one through seven based on winning percentage, using conference games only. The bottom two seeds play a single elimination opening round, with the winner advancing to the double-elimination rounds. The top two seeds receive a single bye.

Team	W	L	PCT	GB	Seed
UIC	17	6	.739	—	1
Wright State	16	6	.727	0.5	2
Youngstown State	13	12	.520	5	3
Cleveland State	10	13	.435	7	4
Milwaukee	11	15	.423	7.5	5
Valparaiso	8	13	.381	8	6
Butler	7	17	.292	10.5	7

== Results ==
=== Opening round ===
May 20, 2008
Team	R
(7) Butler	5
(6) Valparaiso	6

=== Double-elimination rounds ===
Upper round 1	Upper round 2	Upper final	Final
1	UIC	8
4	Cleveland State	7	6	Valparaiso	5
5	Milwaukee	10 ^{14}	1	UIC	7
5	Milwaukee	5
2	Wright State	3
3	Youngstown State	2	5	Milwaukee	20
6	Valparaiso	3
1	UIC	2	16
5	Milwaukee	7	3
Lower round 1	Lower round 2	Lower round 3	Lower final
5	Milwaukee	8
6	Valparaiso	13	6	Valparaiso	3
2	Wright State	7	2	Wright State	4
4	Cleveland State	10	4	Cleveland State	4
3	Youngstown State	4

== All-Tournament Team ==
The following players were named to the All-Tournament Team.

POS	Name	School
P	Peter Ifft	UIC
P	Ben McClarey	Milwaukee
C	Kevin Coddington	UIC
1B	Brett Schaefer	UIC
2B	Jesse Hart	Milwaukee
3B	Josh Wallace	Valparaiso
SS	Brett Bivens	Valparaiso
OF	Dan DeBruin	Valparaiso
OF	Troy Vesling	Milwaukee
OF	Steve McGuiggan	UIC
DH	Shawn Wozniak	Milwaukee

=== Most Valuable Player ===
Brett Schaefer was named Most Valuable Player of the Tournament. Schaefer was a first baseman for UIC who finished 11 for 15 with 7 RBI for the tournament, including 5 for 5 in the final.
