= 2007 Horizon League baseball tournament =

- Teams: 6
- Format: Double-elimination
- Finals site: Les Miller Field; Chicago, Illinois
- Champions: UIC (3rd title)
- Winning coach: Mike Dee (3rd title)
- MVP: David Cales (UIC)

2007 Horizon League baseball standings
	Conf.				Overall
Team	W		L	PCT	W		L	PCT
UIC ‍‍‡‍^{y}	21	–	6	.778	35	–	21	.625
Wright State ‍‍‍	21	–	9	.700	36	–	22	.621
Milwaukee ‍‍‍	16	–	14	.533	25	–	32	.439
Cleveland State ‍‍‍	10	–	17	.370	14	–	44	.241
Butler ‍‍‍	10	–	20	.333	22	–	33	.400
Youngstown State ‍‍‍	9	–	21	.300	19	–	37	.339
‡ – Tournament champion y – Invited to the NCAA Tournament; As of May 30, 2007; Rankings from Collegiate Baseball

The 2007 Horizon League baseball tournament took place from May 23 through 26, near the close of the 2007 NCAA Division I baseball season. All six of the league's teams met in the double-elimination tournament held at Les Miller Field on the campus of regular season champion UIC in Chicago, Illinois. Top seeded UIC won their third Horizon League Championship and earned the conference's automatic bid to the 2007 NCAA Division I baseball tournament.

== Seeding and format ==
The league's teams are seeded one through six based on winning percentage, using conference games only. The top two seeds receive a single bye in the double-elimination format.

Team	W	L	PCT	GB	Seed
UIC	21	6	.778	—	1
Wright State	21	9	.700	1.5	2
Milwaukee	16	14	.533	6.5	3
Cleveland State	10	17	.370	11	4
Butler	10	20	.333	12.5	5
Youngstown State	9	21	.300	13.5	6

== Bracket and results ==
Upper round 1	Upper round 2	Upper final	Final
1	UIC	8
4	Cleveland State	6	4	Cleveland State	5
5	Butler	1	1	UIC	13
2	Wright State	3
2	Wright State	17^{13}
3	Milwaukee	16	3	Milwaukee	13
6	Youngstown State	6
1	UIC	14	—
2	Wright State	2	—
Lower round 1	Lower round 2	Lower round 3	Lower final
2	Wright State	12
3	Milwaukee	9	3	Milwaukee	11
4	Cleveland State	9	6	Youngstown State	0
5	Butler	7	6	Youngstown State	15
6	Youngstown State	20

== All-Tournament Team ==
The following players were named to the All-Tournament Team.

Name	School
Dan Luczak	Milwaukee
Stephen Procner	Cleveland State
David Cales	UIC
Jeremy Hamilton	Wright State
Jesse Hart	Milwaukee
Chad Schroeder	UIC
Nick Rainwater	UIC
Chad Schroeder	UIC
Larry Gempp Jr	UIC
Brian Shoup	Wright State
Ryan Zink	UIC

=== Most Valuable Player ===
David Cales was named Most Valuable Player of the Tournament. Cales was a second baseman and pitcher for UIC who finished 8 for 13 with three home runs, three doubles, five runs, and seven RBI at the plate. He also earned a save in the Flames first game and recorded the last three outs in the final.
