= 2026 Milwaukee Panthers baseball team =

American college baseball season

2026 Milwaukee Panthers baseball

Horizon League tournament champions

Auburn Regional, 2–2
- Conference: Horizon League
- Record: 27–31 (14–10 Horizon)
- Head coach: Shaun Wegner (3rd season)
- Assistant coaches: Mike Porcaro (4th season); Jack Sievers (3rd season)
- Hitting coach: Andy Bergholz (2nd season)
- Pitching coach: Cory Bigler (23rd season)
- Home stadium: Franklin Field

2026 Horizon League baseball standings
| | Conf. | | | | Overall |
| Team | W | | L | PCT | W | | L | PCT |
|---|---|---|---|---|---|---|---|---|
| Wright State ‍†‍‍ | 17 | – | 7 | .708 | 25 | – | 26 | .490 |
| Milwaukee ‍‍‡‍^{y} | 14 | – | 10 | .583 | 22 | – | 31 | .415 |
| Northern Kentucky ‍‍‍ | 12 | – | 12 | .500 | 24 | – | 28 | .462 |
| Youngstown State ‍‍‍ | 12 | – | 12 | .500 | 15 | – | 38 | .283 |
| Oakland ‍‍‍ | 5 | – | 19 | .208 | 10 | – | 40 | .200 |
† – Conference champion ‡ – Tournament champion y – Invited to the NCAA Tournament; As of May 17, 2026; Rankings from D1Baseball

The 2026 Milwaukee Panthers baseball team represented University of Wisconsin–Milwaukee during the 2026 NCAA Division I baseball season. The Panthers played their home games at Franklin Field as a member of the Horizon League. They were led by third-year head coach Shaun Wegner.

The 2026 season was the most successful postseason in Milwaukee program history. The program won a school record two NCAA tournament games and advanced to the regional final for the first time in program history. It was Milwaukee's first NCAA tournament victory since 1999, and their first season in the NCAA tournament since 2010.

== Background ==
Milwaukee is coming off a 2025 season that saw the program finish with a 24–35 overall record and a 16–13 record in the Horizon League. The Panthers were the three seed in the 2025 Horizon League baseball tournament, where they went 3–2 in the tournament, before losing to Wright State in the Horizon League championship.

== Preseason ==
=== Coaches poll ===
The coaches poll was released on February 12, 2026. Milwaukee was selected to finish second in the conference.

Horizon League coaches poll
| Predicted finish | Team | Votes (1st place) |
| 1 | Wright State | 24 (4) |
| 2 | Milwaukee | 18 |
| 3 | Northern Kentucky | 12 |
| 4 | Youngstown State | 11 |
| 5 | Oakland | 10 (1) |

=== Awards and honors ===
==== Preseason Horizon League awards and honors ====
Preseason All-Horizon Team
| Player | No. | Position | Class |
| Gavin Theis | 18 | RHP | Graduate |
| Tate Schmidt | 3 | INF | Sophomore |

== Game log ==
2026 Milwaukee Panthers baseball game log (27–33)
Regular Season (22–31)

February (2–7)
| Date | TV | Opponent | Rank | Stadium | Score | Win | Loss | Save | Attendance | Record | HZN |
|---|---|---|---|---|---|---|---|---|---|---|---|
| February 13 | SECN+ | at No. 2 LSU* | | Alex Box Stadium; Baton Rouge, LA | **L** 5–15^{(8)} | Guidry (1–0) | **Andrews** (0–1) | — | 11,582 | 0–1 | — |
| February 14 | SECN+ | at No. 2 LSU* | | Alex Box Stadium | **L** 3–5 | Moore (1–0) | **Ehmke** (0–1) | Fontenot (1) | 11,078 | 0–2 | — |
| February 15 | SECN+ | at No. 2 LSU* | | Alex Box Stadium | **L** 7–21^{(7)} | Schmidt (1–0) | **Arnold** (0–1) | — | 10,753 | 0–3 | — |
| February 20 | ACCNX | at Duke* | | Jack Coombs Field; Durham, NC | **L** 3–20^{(7)} | Weaver (2–0) | **Weckler** (0–1) | — | 437 | 0–4 | — |
| February 21 | ACCNX | at Duke* | | Jack Coombs Field | **L** 8–10 | Mastroiann (2–0) | **Ehmke** (0–2) | DiGiacomo (1) | 526 | 0–5 | — |
| February 21 | ACCNX | at Duke* | | Jack Coombs Field | **W** 9–6 | **Ishida** (1–0) | Lemke (0–2) | — | 526 | 1–5 | — |
| February 22 | ACCNX | at Duke* | | Jack Coombs Field | **L** 1–6 | Leon (1–0) | **Peterson** (0–1) | — | 359 | 1–6 | — |
| February 27 | | at Evansville* | | Braun Stadium; Evansville, IN | **W** 12–9 | **Kuhnke** (1–0) | Young (0–1) | — | 381 | 2–6 | — |
| February 28 | | at Evansville* | | Braun Stadium | **L** 1–2 | Hansmann (1–0) | **Ehmke** (0–3) | Graham (2) | 376 | 2–7 | — |

March (3–14)
| Date | TV | Opponent | Rank | Stadium | Score | Win | Loss | Save | Attendance | Record | HZN |
|---|---|---|---|---|---|---|---|---|---|---|---|
| March 1 | | at Evansville* | | Braun Stadium | **L** 2–4 | Reed (2–1) | **Peterson** (0–2) | Byberg (1) | 304 | 2–8 | — |
| March 3 | B1G+ | at Minnesota* | | U.S. Bank Stadium; Minneapolis, MN | **L** 4–14^{(8)} | Sperry (2–0) | **Mueller** (0–1) | Ryerse (1) | 1,255 | 2–9 | — |
| March 4 | B1G+ | at Minnesota* | | U.S. Bank Stadium | **L** 2–6 | Capomaccio (1–0) | **Ishida** (1–1) | — | 1,472 | 2–10 | — |
| March 6 | | at Southeast Missouri* | | Capaha Field; Cape Girardeau, MO | **L** 2–8 | Pennington (3–0) | **Theis** (0–1) | Kranawetter (2) | 197 | 2–11 | — |
| March 7 | | at Southeast Missouri* | | Capaha Field | **L** 2–9 | Mertens (2–2) | **Ehmke** (0–4) | — | 200 | 2–12 | — |
| March 8 | | at Southeast Missouri* | | Capaha Field | **L** 2–12^{(7)} | Carroll (2–1) | **Peterson** (0–3) | — | 228 | 2–13 | — |
| March 10 | B1G+ | at Purdue* | | Alexander Field; West Lafayette, IN | **L** 1–17 | Klug (3–1) | **Arnold** (0–2) | — | 1,224 | 2–14 | — |
| March 13 | | at Northern Kentucky | | Bill Aker Ballpark; Highland Heights, KY | **W** 16–9 | **Theis** (1–1) | Wilson (1–1) | — | 108 | 3–14 | 1–0 |
| March 14 | | at Northern Kentucky | | Bill Aker Ballpark | **L** 1–14^{(7)} | Miramontes (1–2) | **Ehmke** (0–5) | — | 134 | 3–15 | 1–1 |
| March 15 | | at Northern Kentucky | | Bill Aker Ballpark | **W** 16–10^{(14)} | **Ishida** (2–1) | Lange (0–2) | — | 86 | 4–15 | 2–1 |
| March 17 | | at Western Illinois* | | Alfred D. Boyer Stadium; Macomb, IL | **Canceled** (inclement weather) | | | | | | |
| March 20 | | at Wright State | | Nischwitz Stadium; Dayton, OH | **L** 4–8 | Thompson (2–1) | **Andrews** (0–2) | — | 274 | 4–16 | 2–2 |
| March 21 | | at Wright State | | Nischwitz Stadium | **L** 3–8 | Paige (1–4) | **Hrin** (0–1) | Bilo (1) | 317 | 4–17 | 2–3 |
| March 22 | | at Wright State | | Nischwitz Stadium | **L** 5–6 | Zielinski (1–0) | **Kuhnke** (1–1) | — | 280 | 4–18 | 2–4 |
| March 27 | | Butler* | | Franklin Field; Milwaukee, WI | **L** 2–6 | Buckley (1–5) | **Theis** (1–2) | — | 249 | 4–19 | — |
| March 28 | | Butler* | | Franklin Field | **W** 10–3 | **Peterson** (1–3) | Thomas (0–4) | — | 279 | 5–19 | — |
| March 29 | | Butler* | | Franklin Field | **L** 7–8 | Hagen (2–0) | **Weckler** (0–2) | Sherrard (1) | 281 | 5–20 | — |
| March 31 | | at UIC* | | Curtis Granderson Stadium; Chicago, IL | **L** 5–12 | Lessman (1–1) | **Arnold** (0–3) | — | 43 | 5–21 | — |

April (10–6)
| Date | TV | Opponent | Rank | Stadium | Score | Win | Loss | Save | Attendance | Record | HZN |
|---|---|---|---|---|---|---|---|---|---|---|---|
| April 3 | ESPN+ | Youngstown State | | Franklin Field | **L** 3–5 | Gebhardt (2–1) | **Watson** (0–1) | — | 207 | 5–22 | 2–5 |
| April 4 | ESPN+ | Youngstown State | | Franklin Field | **L** 4–7 | Messmore (1–5) | **Weckler** (0–3) | Smith (1) | 213 | 5–23 | 2–6 |
| April 5 | ESPN+ | Youngstown State | | Franklin Field | **W** 5–1 | **Peterson** (2–3) | Mikos (0–5) | — | 178 | 6–23 | 3–6 |
| April 7 | | Iowa* | | Franklin Field | **Canceled** (RPI concerns) | | | | | | |
| April 10 | ESPN+ | at Oakland | | Oakland Baseball Field; Auburn Hills, MI | **W** 12–4 | **Theis** (2–2) | Donley (1–1) | — | 76 | 7–23 | 4–6 |
| April 11 | ESPN+ | at Oakland | | Oakland Baseball Field | **L** 5–6 | Donley (2–1) | **Weckler** (0–4) | Sehlke (1) | 107 | 7–24 | 4–7 |
| April 12 | ESPN+ | at Oakland | | Oakland Baseball Field | **W** 12–0^{(7)} | **Peterson** (3–3) | Green (1–2) | — | 102 | 8–24 | 5–7 |
| April 13 | | at Central Michigan* | | Theunissen Stadium; Mount Pleasant, MI | **W** 9–6 | **Riel** (1–0) | Tarnowski (0–1) | **Kuhnke** (1) | 155 | 9–24 | — |
| April 16 | ESPN+ | Northern Kentucky | | Franklin Field | **W** 6–5^{(11)} | **Ishida** (3–1) | Take (2–1) | — | 197 | 10–24 | 6–7 |
| April 17 | ESPN+ | Northern Kentucky | | Franklin Field | **W** 14–4^{(8)} | **Ehmke** (1–5) | Miramontes (2–4) | — | 229 | 11–24 | 7–7 |
| April 18 | ESPN+ | Northern Kentucky | | Franklin Field | **W** 15–9 | **Ishida** (4–1) | Gill (1–2) | — | 243 | 12–24 | 8–7 |
| April 21 | | St. Thomas (MN)* | | Franklin Field | **W** 9–8 | **Riel** (2–0) | Nelson (0–1) | **Kuhnke** (2) | 179 | 13–24 | — |
| April 24 | ESPN+ | Wright State | | Franklin Field | **W** 10–7 | **Kuhnke** (2–1) | Paplanus (1–3) | — | 253 | 14–24 | 9–7 |
| April 25 | ESPN+ | Wright State | | Franklin Field | **W** 4–0 | **Ehmke** (2–5) | Paige (2–6) | — | 279 | 15–24 | 10–7 |
| April 26 | ESPN+ | Wright State | | Franklin Field | **L** 2–13^{(8)} | Lax (7–0) | **Peterson** (3–4) | — | 263 | 15–25 | 10–8 |
| April 28 | B1G+ | at Northwestern* | | Rocky & Berenice Miller Park; Evanston, IL | **L** 8–10 | Bridges (2–0) | **Ishida** (4–2) | Shearer (1) | 231 | 15–26 | — |
| April 29 | ACCNX | at Notre Dame* | | Frank Eck Stadium; South Bend, IN | **L** 2–16^{(7)} | Clark (1–0) | **Vander Loop** (0–1) | — | 113 | 15–27 | — |

May (7–4)
| Date | TV | Opponent | Rank | Stadium | Score | Win | Loss | Save | Attendance | Record | HZN |
|---|---|---|---|---|---|---|---|---|---|---|---|
| May 1 | YouTube | at UNLV* | | Earl Wilson Stadium; Las Vegas, NV | **L** 4–14^{(8)} | Marton (2–3) | **Weckler** (0–5) | — | 800 | 15–28 | — |
| May 2 | YouTube | at UNLV* | | Earl Wilson Stadium | **W** 4–1 | **Ehmke** (3–5) | Lane (1–4) | **Kuhnke** (3) | 624 | 16–28 | — |
| May 3 | YouTube | at UNLV* | | Earl Wilson Stadium | **L** 7–8 | Gomberg (1–4) | **Weckler** (0–6) | — | 571 | 16–29 | — |
| May 5 | ESPN+ | Valparaiso* | | Franklin Field | **W** 6–4 | **Arnold** (1–3) | Boynton (0–8) | **Kuhnke** (4) | 2,414 | 17–29 | — |
| May 6 | ESPN+ | at UIC* | | Curtis Granderson Stadium | **W** 12–6 | **Vander Loop** (1–1) | Buss (0–5) | **Weckler** (1) | 138 | 18–29 | — |
| May 8 | | at Youngstown State | | 717 Credit Unoim Field; Youngstown, OH | **L** 11–13 | Gebhardt (4–3) | **Theis** (2–3) | Wemer (1) | 3,886 | 18–30 | 10–9 |
| May 9 | | at Youngstown State | | 717 Credit Union Field | **L** 3–4 | Messmore (2–6) | **Ehmke** (3–6) | Heflin (1) | 222 | 18–31 | 10–10 |
| May 10 | | at Youngstown State | | 717 Credit Union Field | **W** 12–8 | **Peterson** (4–4) | Mikos (0–9) | **Kuhnke** (5) | 308 | 19–31 | 11–10 |
| May 12 | | at Northern Illinois* | | Ralph McKinzie Field; DeKalb, IL | **Canceled** (inclement weather) | | | | | | |
| May 14 | ESPN+ | Oakland | | Franklin Field | **W** 12–11^{(11)} | **Kuhnke** (3–1) | Cooper (0–2) | — | 259 | 20–31 | 12–10 |
| May 15 | ESPN+ | Oakland | | Franklin Field | **W** 8–4 | **Ehmke** (4–6) | Rosenblitt (1–4) | **Arnold** (1) | 234 | 21–31 | 13–10 |
| May 16 | ESPN+ | Oakland | | Franklin Field | **W** 14–8 | **Vander Loop** (2–1) | Glassman (0–5) | — | 317 | 22–31 | 14–10 |

Postseason (5–2)

Horizon tournament (3–0)
| Date | TV | Opponent | Rank | Stadium | Score | Win | Loss | Save | Attendance | Record | HZNT |
|---|---|---|---|---|---|---|---|---|---|---|---|
| May 21 | ESPN+ | vs. (3) Northern Kentucky | (2) | Nischwitz Stadium | **W** 14–2 | **Ehmke** (5–6) | Miramontes (4–3) | — | 467 | 23–31 | 1–0 |
| May 22 | ESPN+ | at (1) Wright State | (2) | Nischwitz Stadium | **W** 12–8 | **Peterson** (5–4) | Paige (3–7) | **Kuhnke** (6) | 443 | 24–31 | 2–0 |
| May 23 | ESPN+ | vs. (5) Oakland | (2) | Nischwitz Stadium | **W** 5–4 | **Kuhnke** (4–1) | Paplanus (1–5) | — | 580 | 25–31 | 3–0 |

NCAA Auburn Regional (2–2)
| Date | TV | Opponent | Rank | Stadium | Score | Win | Loss | Save | Attendance | Record | NCAAT |
|---|---|---|---|---|---|---|---|---|---|---|---|
| May 29 | ESPN+ | at No. 5 (1) Auburn* | (4) | Plainsman Park; Auburn, AL | **W** 13–8 | **Peterson** (6–4) | Marciano (5–6) | — | 6,408 | 26–31 | 1–0 |
| May 30 | ESPN+ | vs. (2) UCF* | (4) | Plainsman Park | **W** 13–6 | **Ehmke** (6–6) | Gray (5–2) | — | 6,104 | 27–31 | 2–0 |
| May 31 | ESPN+ | at No. 5 (1) Auburn* | (4) | Plainsman Park | **L** 1–8 | Cormier (2–0) | **Kunhke** (4–2) | — | 6,090 | 27–32 | 2–1 |
| June 1 | ESPN+ | at No. 5 (1) Auburn* | (4) | Plainsman Park | **L** 3–8 | Sanders (5–1) | **Weckler** (0–7) | — | 8,228 | 27–33 | 2–2 |

Legend: = Win = Loss = Canceled
Bold = Milwaukee team member * Non-conference game
Rankings are based on the team's current ranking in the D1Baseball poll.

== Postseason ==
=== Horizon League tournament ===
Horizon League baseball tournament
| (1) Wright State Raiders | (2) Milwaukee Panthers | (3) Northern Kentucky Norse | (4) Youngstown State Penguins | (5) Oakland Golden Grizzlies |

Play-In Game
4 | Youngstown State | 3
5 | Oakland | 10

Quarterfinals
1 | Wright State | 7
5 | Oakland | 5
2 | Milwaukee | 14
3 | Northern Kentucky | 2
Lower round 2
3 | Northern Kentucky | 3
5 | Oakland | 5

Semifinals
1 | Wright State | 1
2 | Milwaukee | 4
Lower final
1 | Wright State | 5
5 | Oakland | 11

Finals
2 | Milwaukee | 5 | -
5 | Oakland | 4 | -

=== NCAA Auburn Regional ===
NCAA Auburn Regional
| (1) Auburn Tigers | (2) UCF Knights | (3) NC State Wolfpack | (4) Milwaukee Panthers |

Regional
1 | Auburn | 8
4 | Milwaukee | 13
Winner's bracket
3 | NC State | 3
2 | UCF | 9
1 | Auburn | 17
3 | NC State | 13
Loser's bracket

Regional
4 | Milwaukee | 13
2 | UCF | 6
1 | Auburn
2 | UCF | 3

Finals
4 | Milwaukee | 1 | 3
1 | Auburn | 8 | 8
