= 2003 Horizon League baseball tournament =

- Teams: 7
- Format: Double-elimination
- Finals site: Nischwitz Stadium; Dayton, OH
- Champions: UIC (1st title)
- Winning coach: Mike Florak (1st title)
- MVP: Justin Banks (Youngstown State)

2003 Horizon League baseball standings
	Conf.				Overall
Team	W		L	PCT	W		L	PCT
UIC ‍‍‡‍^{y}	15	–	6	.714	39	–	18	.684
Butler ‍‍‍	16	–	8	.667	34	–	27	.557
Milwaukee ‍‍‍	13	–	10	.565	25	–	25	.500
Youngstown State ‍‍‍	12	–	11	.522	27	–	28	.491
Wright State ‍‍‍	10	–	13	.435	21	–	34	.382
Detroit ‍‍‍	8	–	12	.400	15	–	32	.319
Cleveland State ‍‍‍	4	–	18	.182	13	–	39	.250
‡ – Tournament champion y – Invited to the NCAA Tournament; As of June 30, 2003; Rankings from Collegiate Baseball

The 2003 Horizon League baseball tournament took place from May 21 through 25, near the close of the 2003 NCAA Division I baseball season. All seven of the league's teams met in the double-elimination tournament held at Nischwitz Stadium on the campus of Wright State in Dayton, Ohio. Top seeded UIC won their first Horizon League Championship and earned the conference's automatic bid to the 2003 NCAA Division I baseball tournament.

== Seeding and format ==
The league's teams are seeded one through seven based on winning percentage, using conference games only. The bottom two seeds played an opening round game, with the winner advancing to the double-elimination format.

Team	W	L	PCT	GB	Seed
UIC	15	6	.714	—	1
Butler	16	8	.667	1.5	2
Milwaukee	13	10	.565	3	3
Youngstown State	12	11	.522	4	4
Wright State	10	13	.435	6	5
Detroit	8	12	.400	6.5	6
Cleveland State	4	18	.182	11.5	7

== Bracket and results ==
=== Opening round ===
May 21, 2003
Team	R
(7) Cleveland State	7
(6) Detroit	6

=== Double-elimination rounds ===
First round
1	UIC	11
7	Cleveland State	4
3	Milwaukee	6
4	Youngstown State	9
2	Butler	2^{10}
5	Wright State	1

Second round
1	UIC	6
3	Milwaukee	4
4	Youngstown State	6
2	Butler	9
7	Cleveland State	5
5	Wright State	4

Third round
1	UIC	9
2	Butler	0
4	Youngstown State	4
7	Cleveland State	10

Semifinals
2	Butler	7
7	Cleveland State	6

Final
1	UIC	2
2	Butler	1

== All-Tournament Team ==
The following players were named to the All-Tournament Team.

Name	School
Mike Hughes	UIC
Jordan DeVoir	UIC
Ryan Martin	UIC
Kevin Nelson	UIC
Jared Lowe	Butler
Tim Marks	Butler
Justin McKinley	Butler
Aaron Phillips	Butler
Dominic Erney	Cleveland State
Matt Kaltenbach	Cleveland State
Ben Smith	Cleveland State

=== Most Valuable Player ===
Mike Hughes of UIC was named Most Valuable Player of the Tournament.
