= 2004 Horizon League baseball tournament =

- Teams: 7
- Format: Double-elimination
- Finals site: Eastwood Field; Niles, OH
- Champions: Youngstown State (1st title)
- Winning coach: Mike Florak (1st title)
- MVP: Justin Banks (Youngstown State)

2004 Horizon League baseball standings
	Conf.				Overall
Team	W		L	PCT	W		L	PCT
UIC ‍‍‍	14	–	8	.636	35	–	21	.625
Butler ‍‍‍	13	–	11	.542	29	–	30	.492
Cleveland State ‍‍‍	11	–	12	.478	19	–	33	.365
Wright State ‍‍‍	10	–	11	.476	22	–	32	.407
Milwaukee ‍‍‍	9	–	10	.474	23	–	30	.434
Detroit ‍‍‍	10	–	12	.455	19	–	38	.333
Youngstown State ‍‍‡‍^{y}	7	–	10	.412	22	–	32	.407
‡ – Tournament champion y – Invited to the NCAA Tournament; As of June 30, 2004; Rankings from Collegiate Baseball

The 2004 Horizon League baseball tournament took place from May 26 through 29, near the close of the 2004 NCAA Division I baseball season. All seven of the league's teams met in the double-elimination tournament held at Eastwood Field in Niles, Ohio. Seventh seeded Youngstown State won their first Horizon League Championship and earned the conference's automatic bid to the 2004 NCAA Division I baseball tournament.

== Seeding and format ==
The league's teams are seeded one through seven based on winning percentage, using conference games only. The top seed received a single bye in the double-elimination format.

Team	W	L	PCT	GB	Seed
UIC	14	8	.636	—	1
Butler	13	11	.542	2	2
Cleveland State	11	12	.478	3.5	3
Wright State	10	11	.476	3.5	4
Milwaukee	9	10	.474	3.5	5
Detroit	10	12	.455	4	6
Youngstown State	7	10	.412	4.5	7

== Bracket and results ==
Upper round 1
4	Wright State	3
5	Milwaukee	11
3	Cleveland State	11
6	Detroit	6
2	Butler	3
7	Youngstown State	4
Lower round 1
4	Wright State	3
6	Detroit	7
5	Milwaukee	12
2	Butler	15

Upper round 2
1	UIC	9
5	Milwaukee	6
3	Cleveland State	2
7	Youngstown State	7
Lower round 2
3	Cleveland State	2
2	Butler	1
6	Detroit	3
2	Butler	4

Upper final
1	UIC	4
7	Youngstown State	5
Lower final
1	UIC	8
3	Cleveland State	12

Final
7	Youngstown State	10
3	Cleveland	1

== All-Tournament Team ==
The following players were named to the All-Tournament Team.

Name	School
Matt Alexander	Milwaukee
Justin Banks	Youngstown State
Doug Besozzi	Cleveland State
Jordan DeVoir	UIC
Ryan Dukovich	Cleveland State
Kevin Libeg	Youngstown State
Dale Mueller	Butler
Tim Poley	Detroit
Cory Rojeck	Cleveland State
Eric Shaffer	Youngstown State
Ben Stanczyk	Milwaukee

=== Most Valuable Player ===
Justin Banks of Youngstown State was named Most Valuable Player of the Tournament.
