= 2009 Horizon League baseball tournament =

- Teams: 7
- Format: Double-elimination
- Finals site: The Pipe Yard; Lorain, Ohio
- Champions: Wright State (3rd title)
- Winning coach: Rob Cooper (2nd title)
- MVP: Kory Twede (Wright State)

2009 Horizon League baseball standings
	Conf.				Overall
Team	W		L	PCT	W		L	PCT
UIC ‍‍‍	17	–	6	.739	29	–	23	.558
Milwaukee ‍‍‍	14	–	9	.609	28	–	27	.509
Wright State ‍‍‡‍^{y}	14	–	12	.538	33	–	30	.524
Valparaiso ‍‍‍	12	–	11	.522	28	–	24	.538
Cleveland State ‍‍‍	12	–	13	.480	21	–	31	.404
Youngstown State ‍‍‍	10	–	14	.417	16	–	35	.314
Butler ‍‍‍	6	–	20	.231	13	–	41	.241
‡ – Tournament champion y – Invited to the NCAA Tournament; As of May 30, 2009; Rankings from Collegiate Baseball

The 2009 Horizon League baseball tournament took place from May 19 through 23, near the close of the 2009 NCAA Division I baseball season. All seven of the league's teams met in the double-elimination tournament held at The Pipe Yard in Lorain, Ohio. Third seeded Wright State won their third Horizon League Championship and earned the conference's automatic bid to the 2009 NCAA Division I baseball tournament.

== Seeding and format ==
The league's seven teams are seeded one through seven based on winning percentage, using conference games only. The bottom two seeds play a single elimination opening round, with the winner advancing to the double-elimination rounds. The top two seeds receive a single bye.

Team	W	L	PCT	GB	Seed
UIC	17	6	.739	—	1
Milwaukee	14	9	.609	3	2
Wright State	14	12	.538	4.5	3
Valparaiso	12	11	.522	5	4
Cleveland State	12	13	.480	6	5
Youngstown State	10	14	.417	7.5	6
Butler	6	20	.231	12.5	7

== Results ==
=== Opening round ===
May 19, 2009
Team	R
(7) Butler	7
(6) Youngstown State	6

=== Double-elimination rounds ===
Upper round 1	Upper round 2	Upper final	Final
1	UIC	16
4	Valparaiso	2	5	Cleveland State	6
5	Cleveland State	4	1	UIC	6
3	Wright State	7
2	Milwaukee	4
3	Wright State	4	3	Wright State	20
7	Butler	2
2	Wright State	0	6 ^{12}
1	UIC	4	2
Lower round 1	Lower round 2	Lower round 3	Lower final
1	UIC	18
5	Cleveland State	5	2	Milwaukee	3
2	Milwaukee	10	2	Milwaukee	6
4	Valparaiso	4	4	Valparaiso	7
7	Butler	2

== All-Tournament Team ==
The following players were named to the All-Tournament Team.

POS	Name	School
P	Alex Kaminsky	Wright State
P	Mike Kool	UIC
C	Garrett Gray	Wright State
1B	Jeff Mercer	Wright State
2B	Tony Altavilla	UIC
3B	Andy Leonard	UIC
SS	R.J. Gundolff	Wright State
OF	Ryan Ashe	Wright State
OF	John Rosinski	UIC
OF	Kory Twede	Wright State
DH	Brett Schaefer	UIC

=== Most Valuable Player ===
Kory Twede was named Most Valuable Player of the Tournament. Twede was an outfielder for Wright State who finished 12-for-22 (.545) with two doubles, two home runs, four runs, and nine RBI in five games.
