= 2006 Horizon League baseball tournament =

- Teams: 6
- Format: Double-elimination
- Finals site: Nischwitz Stadium; Dayton, Ohio
- Champions: Wright State (2nd title)
- Winning coach: Rob Cooper (1st title)
- MVP: Ross Oeder (Wright State)

2006 Horizon League baseball standings
	Conf.				Overall
Team	W		L	PCT	W		L	PCT
UIC ‍‍‍	22	–	7	.759	35	–	20	.636
Milwaukee ‍‍‍	18	–	12	.600	32	–	25	.561
Wright State ‍‍‡‍^{y}	17	–	13	.567	32	–	27	.542
Youngstown State ‍‍‍	16	–	13	.552	26	–	29	.473
Butler ‍‍‍	9	–	21	.300	21	–	36	.368
Cleveland State ‍‍‍	6	–	22	.214	10	–	42	.192
‡ – Tournament champion y – Invited to the NCAA Tournament; As of May 30, 2006; Rankings from Collegiate Baseball

The 2006 Horizon League baseball tournament took place from May 25 through 28, near the close of the 2006 NCAA Division I baseball season. All six of the league's teams met in the double-elimination tournament held at Nischwitz Stadium on the campus of Wright State in Dayton, OH. Third seeded Wright State won their second Horizon League Championship and earned the conference's automatic bid to the 2006 NCAA Division I baseball tournament.

== Seeding and format ==
The league's teams are seeded one through six based on winning percentage, using conference games only. The top two seeds receive a single bye in the double-elimination format.

Team	W	L	PCT	GB	Seed
UIC	22	7	.759	—	1
Milwaukee	18	12	.600	4.5	2
Wright State	17	13	.567	5.5	3
Youngstown State	16	13	.552	6	4
Butler	9	21	.300	13.5	5
Cleveland State	6	22	.214	15.5	6

== Bracket and results ==
Upper round 1	Upper round 2	Upper final	Final
1	UIC	4
4	Youngstown State	4	5	Butler	6
5	Butler	5^{10}	5	Butler	0
3	Wright State	12
2	Milwaukee	3
3	Wright State	16	3	Wright State	20
6	Cleveland State	1
3	Wright State	4	—
5	Butler	1	—
Lower round 1	Lower round 2	Lower round 3	Lower final
5	Butler	8
1	UIC	14	1	UIC	6
2	Milwaukee	8	2	Milwaukee	6
4	Youngstown State	4	6	Cleveland State	3
6	Cleveland State	6

== All-Tournament Team ==
The following players were named to the All-Tournament Team.

Name	School
Robert Barrett	Wright State
Brian Deter	Butler
Aaron Garcia	Wright State
Jeremy Hamilton	Wright State
Ross Oeder	Wright State
Jeff Brown	Butler
Stephen Gill	Butler
Amin Abusaleh	Wright State
Ted Rosinski	UIC
Justin Wilson	Wright State
Rob Brockel	Milwaukee

=== Most Valuable Player ===
Ross Oeder was named Most Valuable Player of the Tournament. Oeder was a junior second baseman for Wright State.
