= 1998 Midwestern Collegiate Conference baseball tournament =

- Teams: 6
- Format: Double-elimination
- Finals site: Les Miller Field; Chicago, Illinois
- Champions: Butler (1st title)
- Winning coach: Steve Farley (1st title)
- MVP: Eric Storey (Butler)

1998 Midwestern Collegiate Conference baseball standings
	Conf.				Overall
Team	W		L	PCT	W		L	PCT
Butler ‍‍‡‍^{y}	13	–	5	.722	33	–	21	.611
Milwaukee ‍‍‍	14	–	6	.700	33	–	15	.688
Detroit ‍‍‍	10	–	8	.556	20	–	21	.488
Wright State ‍‍‍	9	–	11	.450	20	–	34	.370
Cleveland State ‍‍‍	8	–	11	.421	21	–	32	.396
UIC ‍‍‍	3	–	16	.158	11	–	25	.306
‡ – Tournament champion y – Invited to the NCAA Tournament; As of June 30, 1998; Rankings from Collegiate Baseball

The 1998 Midwestern Collegiate Conference baseball tournament took place in May of 1998, near the close of the 1998 NCAA Division I baseball season. All six of the league's teams met in the double-elimination tournament held at Les Miller Field on the campus of UIC in Chicago. Top seeded Butler won their second Horizon League Championship and earned the conference's automatic bid to the 1998 NCAA Division I baseball tournament.

== Seeding and format ==
The league's teams are seeded one through six based on winning percentage, using conference games only. The top two seeds received a single bye, meeting first round winners while first round losers played elimination games. This was the first year of the 6 team format, and the only year including first round byes for the top two seeds.

Team	W	L	PCT	GB	Seed
Butler	13	5	.722	—	1
Milwaukee	14	6	.700	1	2
Detroit	10	8	.556	3	3
Wright State	9	11	.450	5	4
Cleveland State	8	11	.421	5.5	5
UIC	3	16	.158	10.5	6

== Bracket and results ==
Upper round 1
4	Wright State	2
5	Cleveland State	3
3	Detroit	9
6	UIC	2
Lower round 1
5	Cleveland State	6
4	UIC	5
3	Detroit	5
6	Wright State	4

Upper round 2
2	Milwaukee	11
5	Cleveland State	4
1	Butler	7
3	Detroit	0
Lower round 2
5	Cleveland State	7
3	Detroit	8

Upper final
2	Milwaukee	3
1	Butler	5 ^{(13)}
Lower final
2	Milwaukee	6
3	Detroit	1

Final
1	Butler	6
2	Milwaukee	2

== All-Tournament Team ==
The following players were named to the All-Tournament Team.

Pos	Name	School
P	Ryan Harber	Butler
P	Mike Casper	Milwaukee
C	Lee Jaramillo	Milwaukee
1B	Jeff Haase	Cleveland State
2B	Greg Toll	Milwaukee
3B	Eric Storey	Butler
SS	Blair Hayward	Butler
OF	Mike Pesci	Detroit
OF	Josh Wilke	Butler
OF	Eric Lubarsky	Milwaukee

=== Most Valuable Player ===
Eric Storey of Butler was named Most Valuable Player of the Tournament.
