= 2010 Horizon League baseball tournament =

- Teams: 6
- Format: Double-elimination
- Finals site: U.S. Steel Yard; Gary, IN
- Champions: Milwaukee (4th title)
- Winning coach: Scott Doffek (1st title)
- MVP: Chad Pierce (Milwaukee)

2010 Horizon League baseball standings
	Conf.				Overall
Team	W		L	PCT	W		L	PCT
Wright State ‍‍‍	17	–	6	.739	31	–	25	.554
Milwaukee ‍‍‡‍^{y}	17	–	8	.680	33	–	26	.559
UIC ‍‍‍	15	–	9	.625	24	–	30	.444
Valparaiso ‍‍‍	9	–	10	.474	24	–	32	.429
Butler ‍‍‍	11	–	13	.458	21	–	29	.420
Youngstown State ‍‍‍	9	–	17	.346	22	–	34	.393
Cleveland State ‍‍‍	5	–	20	.200	12	–	43	.218
‡ – Tournament champion y – Invited to the NCAA Tournament; As of May 30, 2010; Rankings from Collegiate Baseball

The 2010 Horizon League baseball tournament took place from May 27 through 30, near the close of the 2010 NCAA Division I baseball season. The top six of the league's seven teams met in the double-elimination tournament held at U.S. Steel Yard in Gary, Indiana. Second seeded Milwaukee won their fourth Horizon League Championship and earned the conference's automatic bid to the 2010 NCAA Division I baseball tournament.

== Seeding ==
The league's six teams are seeded one through six based on winning percentage, using conference games only.

Team	W	L	PCT	GB	Seed
Wright State	17	6	.739	—	1
Milwaukee	17	8	.680	1	2
UIC	15	9	.625	2.5	3
Valparaiso	9	10	.474	6	4
Butler	11	13	.458	6.5	5
Youngstown State	9	17	.346	9.5	6
Cleveland State	5	20	.200	13	—

== Results ==
Upper round 1	Upper round 2	Upper final	Final
1	Wright State	10
3	UIC	4	6	Youngstown State	8
6	Youngstown State	8	1	Wright State	1
2	Milwaukee	0
2	Milwaukee	3
4	Valparaiso	7	4	Valparaiso	1
5	Butler	3
1	Wright State	7	3
2	Milwaukee	14	6
Lower round 1	Lower round 2	Lower round 3	Lower final
2	Milwaukee	3
4	Valparaiso	10	4	Valparaiso	1
6	Youngstown State	1	3	UIC	5
3	UIC	7	3	UIC	4
5	Butler	0

== All-Tournament Team ==
The following players were named to the All-Tournament Team.

POS	Name	School
P	Casey Henn	Wright State
P	Chad Pierce	Milwaukee
C	Gerald Ogrinc	Wright State
1B	Ben Long	Milwaukee
2B	Aaron Fields	Wright State
3B	C.J. Morris	Youngstown State
SS	Dan Buchholz	Milwaukee
OF	Steve McGuiggan	UIC
OF	Kyle Gaedele	Valparaiso
OF	Steven Scoby	Valparaiso
DH	Sam Sivilotti	Milwaukee

=== Most Valuable Player ===
Chad Pierce was named Most Valuable Player of the Tournament. Pierce was a pitcher for Milwaukee.
