= 2005 Horizon League baseball tournament =

- Teams: 6
- Format: Double-elimination
- Finals site: Victory Field; Indianapolis, IN
- Champions: UIC (2nd title)
- Winning coach: Mike Dee (2nd title)
- MVP: Ryan Zink (UIC)

2005 Horizon League baseball standings
	Conf.				Overall
Team	W		L	PCT	W		L	PCT
UIC ‍‍‡‍^{y}	14	–	6	.700	38	–	21	.644
Youngstown State ‍‍‍	10	–	6	.625	29	–	27	.518
Milwaukee ‍‍‍	12	–	8	.600	26	–	31	.456
Wright State ‍‍‍	11	–	9	.550	26	–	33	.441
Cleveland State ‍‍‍	5	–	15	.250	14	–	36	.280
Butler ‍‍‍	4	–	12	.250	19	–	35	.352
‡ – Tournament champion y – Invited to the NCAA Tournament; As of June 30, 2005; Rankings from Collegiate Baseball

The 2005 Horizon League baseball tournament took place from May 26 through 29, near the close of the 2005 NCAA Division I baseball season. All six of the league's teams met in the double-elimination tournament held at Victory Field in Indianapolis, IN. Top seeded UIC won their second Horizon League Championship and earned the conference's automatic bid to the 2005 NCAA Division I baseball tournament.

== Seeding and format ==
The league's teams are seeded one through six based on winning percentage, using conference games only. The top two seeds receive a single bye in the double-elimination format.

Team	W	L	PCT	GB	Seed
UIC	14	6	.700	—	1
Youngstown State	10	6	.625	2	2
Milwaukee	12	8	.600	2	3
Wright State	11	9	.550	3	4
Cleveland State	5	15	.250	9	5
Butler	4	12	.250	8	6

== Bracket and results ==
Upper round 1	Upper round 2	Upper final	Final
1	UIC	5
4	Wright State	5	4	Wright State	4
5	Cleveland State	2	1	UIC	4
2	Youngstown State	0
2	Youngstown State	9^{11}
3	Milwaukee	7	3	Milwaukee	3
6	Butler	5
1	UIC	4	9
3	Milwaukee	8	6
Lower round 1	Lower round 2	Lower round 3	Lower final
2	Youngstown State	10
3	Milwaukee	4	3	Milwaukee	12
4	Wright State	11	4	Wright State	0
5	Cleveland State	9	5	Cleveland State	10
6	Butler	5

== All-Tournament Team ==
The following players were named to the All-Tournament Team.

Pos.	Name	School
P	Zach Peterson	UIC
P	Ryan Zink	UIC
C	Bryan Nolte	UIC
1B	Blake Kangas	Milwaukee
2B	Bobby Cash	Cleveland State
3B	Justin Banks	Youngstown State
SS	Charles Schultz	Youngstown State
OF	Mike Goetz	Milwaukee
OF	Joe Nowicki	Milwaukee
OF	Bart Babineaux	UIC
DH	Zak Rivera	Milwaukee

=== Most Valuable Player ===
Ryan Zink was named Most Valuable Player of the Tournament. Zink was a sophomore pitcher for UIC who earned the save in the final by pitching the final three innings and allowing just one hit.
