= 2001 Midwestern Collegiate Conference baseball tournament =

- Teams: 6
- Format: Double-elimination
- Finals site: Les Miller Field; Chicago, Illinois
- Champions: Milwaukee (2nd title)
- Winning coach: Jerry Augustine (2nd title)
- MVP: Scott Gillitzer (Milwaukee)

2001 Midwestern Collegiate Conference baseball standings
	Conf.				Overall
Team	W		L	PCT	W		L	PCT
Milwaukee ‍‍‡‍^{y}	16	–	4	.800	39	–	18	.684
UIC ‍‍‍	13	–	7	.650	32	–	28	.533
Wright State ‍‍‍	12	–	8	.600	31	–	27	.534
Butler ‍‍‍	8	–	12	.400	25	–	30	.455
Cleveland State ‍‍‍	6	–	14	.300	23	–	34	.404
Detroit ‍‍‍	5	–	15	.250	12	–	41	.226
‡ – Tournament champion y – Invited to the NCAA Tournament; As of June 30, 2001; Rankings from Collegiate Baseball

The 2001 Midwestern Collegiate Conference baseball tournament took place from May 16 through 20, near the close of the 2001 NCAA Division I baseball season. All six of the league's teams met in the double-elimination tournament held at Les Miller Field on the campus of UIC in Chicago. Top seeded Milwaukee won their second Horizon League Championship and earned the conference's automatic bid to the 2001 NCAA Division I baseball tournament.

== Seeding and format ==
The league's teams are seeded one through six based on winning percentage, using conference games only. The teams then played a double-elimination tournament, with the top seed playing the sixth, second seed playing the fifth, and so on in the first round..

Team	W	L	PCT	GB	Seed
Milwaukee	16	4	.800	—	1
UIC	13	7	.650	3	2
Wright State	12	8	.600	4	3
Butler	8	12	.400	8	4
Cleveland State	6	14	.300	10	5
Detroit	5	15	.250	11	6

== Bracket and results ==
First round
1	Milwaukee	16
6	Detroit	0
3	Wright State	5
4	Butler	6
2	UIC	1
5	Cleveland State	0

Second round
1	Milwaukee	5
3	Wright State	1
4	Butler	0
2	UIC	1
6	Detroit	0
5	Cleveland State	1

Third round
1	Milwaukee	7
2	UIC	6
4	Butler	8
5	Cleveland State	10

Semifinals
2	UIC	1
5	Cleveland State	2

Final
1	Milwaukee	4
5	Cleveland State	1

== Most Valuable Player ==
Scott Gillitzer of Milwaukee was named Most Valuable Player of the Tournament.
