= 2002 Horizon League baseball tournament =

- Teams: 7
- Format: Double-elimination
- Finals site: Jacobs Field; Cleveland, Ohio
- Champions: Milwaukee (3rd title)
- Winning coach: Jerry Augustine (3rd title)
- MVP: Dave Pudlosky (Milwaukee)

2002 Horizon League baseball standings
	Conf.				Overall
Team	W		L	PCT	W		L	PCT
UIC ‍‍‍	14	–	5	.737	39	–	16	.709
Milwaukee ‍‍‡‍^{y}	15	–	8	.652	26	–	20	.565
Youngstown State ‍‍‍	11	–	8	.579	18	–	26	.409
Butler ‍‍‍	11	–	11	.500	34	–	23	.596
Cleveland State ‍‍‍	11	–	12	.478	17	–	35	.327
Wright State ‍‍‍	9	–	14	.391	20	–	33	.377
Detroit ‍‍‍	3	–	16	.158	15	–	36	.294
‡ – Tournament champion y – Invited to the NCAA Tournament; As of June 30, 2002; Rankings from Collegiate Baseball

The 2002 Horizon League baseball tournament took place from May 22 through 26, near the close of the 2002 NCAA Division I baseball season. All seven of the league's teams met in the double-elimination tournament held at Jacobs Field in Cleveland, Ohio. Second seeded Milwaukee won their third Horizon League Championship and earned the conference's automatic bid to the 2002 NCAA Division I baseball tournament.

== Seeding and format ==
The league's teams are seeded one through seven based on winning percentage, using conference games only. The bottom two seeds played an opening round game, with the winner advancing to the double-elimination format.

Team	W	L	PCT	GB	Seed
UIC	14	5	.737	—	1
Milwaukee	15	8	.652	2	2
Youngstown State	11	8	.579	3	3
Butler	11	11	.500	4.5	4
Cleveland State	11	12	.478	5	5
Wright State	9	14	.391	7	6
Detroit	3	16	.182	11	7

== Bracket and results ==
=== Opening round ===
May 22, 2002
Team	R
(7) Detroit	3
(6) Wright State	2

=== Double-elimination rounds ===
First round
1	UIC	2
7	Detroit	1
3	Youngstown State	0
4	Butler	1
2	Milwaukee	7
5	Cleveland State	1

Second round
1	UIC	3
3	Youngstown State	2
4	Butler	5
2	Milwaukee	8
7	Detroit	4
5	Cleveland State	2

Third round
1	UIC	0
2	Milwaukee	9
4	Butler	6
7	Detroit	1

Semifinals
1	UIC	5
4	Butler	3

Final
2	Milwaukee	6
1	UIC	3

== All-Tournament Team ==
The following players were named to the All-Tournament Team.

Pos	Name	School
P	Ryan Gehring	UIC
P	Quinton Oldenburg	Milwaukee
P	Pat Neshek	Butler
P	Geoff Lefeber	Milwaukee
C	John Vanden Berg	Milwaukee
1B	Dave Pudlosky	Milwaukee
2B	Jeff Steele	Butler
SS	Charlie Reschke	Milwaukee
OF	Curtis Granderson	UIC
OF	Juston Davenport	Detroit
OF	Roger Wechter	Detroit

=== Most Valuable Player ===
Dave Pudlosky of Milwaukee was named Most Valuable Player of the Tournament. Pudlosky went 3 for 4 in the final.
