= 1997 Midwestern Collegiate Conference baseball tournament =

- Teams: 4
- Format: Double-elimination
- Finals site: Wright Stadium; Dayton, Ohio
- Champions: Detroit (1st title)
- Winning coach: Bob Miller (1st title)
- MVP: Dusty Beam (Detroit)

1997 Midwestern Collegiate Conference baseball standings
	Conf.				Overall
Team	W		L	PCT	W		L	PCT
Wright State ‍‍‍	16	–	8	.667	31	–	28	.525
Detroit ‍‍‡‍^{y}	15	–	9	.625	27	–	24	.529
Milwaukee ‍‍‍	13	–	11	.542	28	–	30	.483
Northern Illinois ‍‍‍	12	–	12	.500	22	–	29	.431
Cleveland State ‍‍‍	12	–	12	.500	22	–	28	.440
Butler ‍‍‍	8	–	16	.333	18	–	32	.360
UIC ‍‍‍	8	–	16	.333	18	–	32	.360
‡ – Tournament champion y – Invited to the NCAA Tournament; As of June 30, 1997; Rankings from Collegiate Baseball

The 1997 Midwestern Collegiate Conference baseball tournament took place in May of 1997, near the close of the 1997 NCAA Division I baseball season. The top four finishers of the league's seven teams met in the double-elimination tournament held at Wright Stadium on the campus of Wright State in Dayton, Ohio. Second seeded Detroit won their first Horizon League Championship and earned the conference's automatic bid to the 1997 NCAA Division I baseball tournament.

== Seeding and format ==
The league's teams are seeded one through four based on winning percentage, using conference games only. The top seed plays the fourth seed while the second seed plays the third seed in the opening round. Northern Illinois claimed the fourth seed by tiebreaker over Cleveland State.

Team	W	L	PCT	GB	Seed
Wright State	16	8	.667	—	1
Detroit	15	9	.625	1	2
Milwaukee	13	11	.542	3	3
Northern Illinois	12	12	.500	4	4
Cleveland State	12	12	.500	4	—
Butler	8	16	.333	8	—
UIC	8	16	.333	8	—

== Bracket and results ==
Upper round 1
1	Wright State	3
4	Northern Illinois	9
3	Milwaukee	6
2	Detroit	7
Lower round 1
1	Wright State	10
3	Milwaukee	1

Upper final
4	Northern Illinois	7
2	Detroit	9
Lower final
4	Northern Illinois	4
1	Wright State	16

Final
2	Detroit	9	6
1	Wright State	10	3

== All-Tournament Team ==
The following players were named to the All-Tournament Team.

Pos	Name	School
P	Casey Sanford	Wright State
P	Chris Andrzejak	Detroit
C	Ryan Tyree	Wright State
1B	Dean Rovinelli	Detroit
2B	Brett Gautcher	Northern Illinois
3B	Ed Gundry	Detroit
SS	Dusty Beam	Wright State
OF	T.D. Hicks	Wright State
OF	Dave Knight	Detroit
OF	Michael Pesci	Detroit
DH	Joe Rodriguez	Northern Illinois

=== Most Valuable Player ===
Dusty Beam of Wright State was named Most Valuable Player of the Tournament.
