= 2000 Midwestern Collegiate Conference baseball tournament =

- Teams: 6
- Format: Double-elimination
- Finals site: Nischwitz Stadium; Dayton, Ohio
- Champions: Butler (2nd title)
- Winning coach: Steve Farley (2nd title)
- MVP: Jeremy Sinsabaugh (Butler)

2000 Midwestern Collegiate Conference baseball standings
	Conf.				Overall
Team	W		L	PCT	W		L	PCT
Milwaukee ‍‍‍	12	–	6	.667	30	–	24	.556
UIC ‍‍‍	12	–	6	.667	33	–	26	.559
Cleveland State ‍‍‍	10	–	9	.526	23	–	33	.411
Butler ‍‍‡‍^{y}	8	–	8	.500	31	–	28	.525
Wright State ‍‍‍	8	–	12	.400	19	–	39	.328
Detroit ‍‍‍	5	–	13	.278	16	–	28	.364
‡ – Tournament champion y – Invited to the NCAA Tournament; As of June 30, 2000; Rankings from Collegiate Baseball

The 2000 Midwestern Collegiate Conference baseball tournament took place from May 18 through 21, near the close of the 2000 NCAA Division I baseball season. All six of the league's teams met in the double-elimination tournament held at Nischwitz Stadium on the campus of Wright State in Dayton, Ohio. Fourth seeded Butler won their second Horizon League Championship and earned the conference's automatic bid to the 2000 NCAA Division I baseball tournament.

== Seeding and format ==
The league's teams are seeded one through six based on winning percentage, using conference games only. The teams then played a double-elimination tournament, with the top seed playing the sixth, second seed playing the fifth, and so on in the first round. Milwaukee claimed the top seed over UIC by tiebreaker.

Team	W	L	PCT	GB	Seed
Milwaukee	12	6	.667	—	1
UIC	12	6	.667	—	2
Cleveland State	10	9	.526	2.5	3
Butler	8	8	.500	3	4
Wright State	8	12	.400	4	5
Detroit	5	13	.278	7	6

== Bracket and results ==
First round
1	Milwaukee	10
6	Detroit	9
3	Cleveland State	10
4	Butler	5
5	Wright State	5
2	UIC	7

Second round
1	Milwaukee	6
4	Butler	12
5	Wright State	9
6	Detroit	2
3	Cleveland State	2
2	UIC	7
1	Milwaukee	6 ^{(10)}
3	Cleveland State	5

Third round
4	Butler	6
5	Wright State	4
2	UIC	5
1	Milwaukee	4

Final
4	Butler	6	4
2	UIC	2	2

== All-Tournament Team ==
The following players were named to the All-Tournament Team.

Pos	Name	School
P	Nick Worm	UIC
P	Neal Walther	Butler
C	Chris Grimm	Wright State
1B	Justin Keever	Butler
2B	Keith Lillash	Cleveland State
3B	Bob Rosinski	UIC
SS	Scott Gillitzer	Milwaukee
OF	Jeremy Sinsabaugh	Butler
OF	J.P. Moran	UIC
OF	Luke Murphy	Butler
DH	Lance Links	Butler

=== Most Valuable Player ===
Jeremy Sinsabaugh of Butler was named Most Valuable Player of the Tournament.
