= 1996 Midwestern Collegiate Conference baseball tournament =

- Teams: 4
- Format: Double-elimination
- Finals site: Bush Stadium; Indianapolis, Indiana
- Champions: Northern Illinois (1st title)
- Winning coach: Spanky McFarland (1st title)
- MVP: Jason King (Northern Illinois)

1996 Midwestern Collegiate Conference baseball standings
	Conf.				Overall
Team	W		L	PCT	W		L	PCT
Butler ‍‍‍	14	–	7	.667	26	–	21	.553
Milwaukee ‍‍‍	13	–	8	.619	23	–	26	.469
UIC ‍‍‍	12	–	10	.545	23	–	26	.469
Northern Illinois ‍‍‡‍^{y}	12	–	10	.545	27	–	30	.474
Detroit ‍‍‍	12	–	10	.545	22	–	18	.550
Wright State ‍‍‍	10	–	12	.455	20	–	28	.417
Cleveland State ‍‍‍	4	–	20	.167	15	–	37	.288
‡ – Tournament champion y – Invited to the NCAA Tournament; As of June 30, 1996; Rankings from Collegiate Baseball

The 1996 Midwestern Collegiate Conference baseball tournament took place in May 1996, near the close of the 1996 NCAA Division I baseball season. The top four finishers of the league's seven teams met in the double-elimination tournament held at Bush Stadium on the campus of Butler in Indianapolis. Second seeded Northern Illinois won their first Horizon League Championship and earned the conference's automatic bid to the 1996 NCAA Division I baseball tournament.

== Seeding and format ==
The league's teams are seeded one through four based on winning percentage, using conference games only. The top seed plays the fourth seed while the second seed plays the third seed in the opening round. Butler claimed the third seed and Northern Illinois the fourth seed over Detroit by tiebreaker.

Team	W	L	PCT	GB	Seed
Butler	14	7	.667	—	1
Milwaukee	13	8	.619	1	2
UIC	12	10	.545	2.5	3
Northern Illinois	12	10	.545	2.5	4
Detroit	12	10	.545	2.5	—
Wright State	10	12	.455	4.5	—
Cleveland State	4	20	.167	11.5	—

== Bracket and results ==
Upper round 1
1	Butler	11
4	Northern Illinois	15
3	UIC	8
2	Milwaukee	5
Lower round 1
1	Butler	5
2	Milwaukee	9

Upper final
4	Northern Illinois	6
3	UIC	7
Lower final
4	Northern Illinois	4
2	Milwaukee	0

Final
3	UIC	0	4
4	Northern Illinois	1	7

== All-Tournament Team ==
The following players were named to the All-Tournament Team.

Pos	Name	School
P	Paul Erschen	Northern Illinois
P	Jason Henry	UIC
C	Clay Schwartz	Milwaukee
1B	John Kravarik	UIC
2B	Joe Waszak	UIC
3B	Matt Buczkowski	Butler
SS	Mike O’Neill	Northern Illinois
OF	Gerad Gast	Northern Illinois
OF	Jason King	Northern Illinois
OF	Jon Piazza	UIC
DH	Tim Kuncis	Northern Illinois

=== Most Valuable Player ===
Jason King of Northern Illinois was named Most Valuable Player of the Tournament.
