= 2012 Horizon League baseball tournament =

- Teams: 6
- Format: Double-elimination
- Finals site: Les Miller Field; Chicago, IL
- Champions: Valparaiso (1st title)
- Winning coach: Tracy Woodson (1st title)
- MVP: Mark Johnson (Valparaiso)

2012 Horizon League baseball standings
	Conf.				Overall
Team	W		L	PCT	W		L	PCT
Valparaiso ‍†‍‡‍^{y}	22	–	8	.733	35	–	25	.583
Wright State ‍‍‍	20	–	10	.667	37	–	21	.638
Milwaukee ‍‍‍	18	–	11	.621	27	–	27	.500
UIC ‍‍‍	12	–	17	.414	23	–	33	.411
Butler ‍‍‍	10	–	20	.333	22	–	34	.393
Youngstown State ‍‍‍	7	–	23	.233	11	–	44	.200
† – Conference champion ‡ – Tournament champion y – Invited to the NCAA Tournament; As of June 30, 2012; Rankings from Collegiate Baseball

The 2012 Horizon League baseball tournament took place from May 23 through 27. All six of the league's teams met in the double-elimination tournament held at UIC's Les Miller Field. Top seeded Valparaiso won their first Horizon League Championship and earned the conference's automatic bid to the 2012 NCAA Division I baseball tournament.

== Seeding ==
The league's six teams are seeded one through six based on winning percentage, using conference games only.

Team	W	L	PCT	GB	Seed
Valparaiso	22	8	.733	–	1
Wright State	20	10	.667	2	2
Milwaukee	18	11	.621	3.5	3
UIC	12	17	.414	9.5	4
Butler	10	20	.333	12	5
Youngstown State	7	23	.233	15	6

== Results ==
Upper round 1	Upper round 2	Upper final	Final
2	Wright State	9
4	UIC	10	4	UIC	19
5	Butler	1	4	UIC	3
1	Valparaiso	4
1	Valparaiso	16
3	Milwaukee	4	6	Youngstown State	3
6	Youngstown State	8
1	Valparaiso	3	14
4	UIC	4	5
Lower round 1	Lower round 2	Lower round 3	Lower final
4	UIC	5
2	Wright State	4	6	Youngstown State	0
3	Milwaukee	1	6	Youngstown State	5
3	Milwaukee	19	2	Wright State	2
5	Butler	2

== All-Tournament Team ==
The following players were named to the All-Tournament Team.

POS	Name	School
P	Blake Aquadro	Youngstown State
P	Tyler Deetjen	Valparaiso
C	Corey Davis	Wright State
1B	Alex Grunenwald	UIC
2B	Tanner Vavra	Valparaiso
SS	Spencer Mahoney	Valparaiso
3B	Joe Betcher	UIC
OF	Jonathan Capasso	Milwaukee
OF	Mark Johnson	Valparaiso
OF	Alex De LaRosa	UIC
U	John Loeffler	Valparaiso

=== Most Valuable Player ===
Mark Johnson was named Most Valuable Player of the Tournament. Johnson was an outfielder for Valparaiso.
