= 2013 Horizon League baseball tournament =

- Teams: 5
- Format: Double-elimination
- Finals site: Eastwood Field; Youngstown, OH
- Champions: Valparaiso (2nd title)
- Winning coach: Tracy Woodson (2nd title)
- MVP: Karch Kowalczyk (Valparaiso)

2013 Horizon League baseball standings
	Conf.				Overall
Team	W		L	PCT	W		L	PCT
Milwaukee ‍‍‍	14	–	7	.667	29	–	21	.580
Valparaiso ‍‍‡‍^{y}	13	–	11	.542	32	–	28	.533
UIC ‍‍‍	13	–	11	.542	27	–	28	.491
Wright State ‍‍‍	9	–	12	.429	22	–	28	.440
Youngstown State ‍‍‍	8	–	16	.333	14	–	41	.255
‡ – Tournament champion y – Invited to the NCAA tournament As of June 30, 2013; Rankings from Collegiate Baseball

The 2013 Horizon League baseball tournament was held from May 22 through 25. All five of the league's teams met in the double-elimination tournament held at Youngstown State University's Eastwood Field. Valparaiso won their second tournament championship and earned the conference's automatic bid to the 2013 NCAA Division I baseball tournament.

== Seeding and format ==
The league's five teams were seeded one through five based on winning percentage, using conference games only. They then played a double-elimination tournament.

Team	W	L	Pct.	GB	Seed
Milwaukee	14	7	.667	–	1
UIC	13	11	.542	2.5	2
Valparaiso	13	11	.542	2.5	3
Wright State	9	12	.429	5	4
Youngstown State	8	16	.333	7.5	5

== Bracket ==
Upper round 1	Upper round 2	Upper final	Final
1	Milwaukee	6
4	Wright State	6	4	Wright State	1
5	Youngstown State	3	1	Milwaukee	4
3	Valparaiso	6
2	UIC	7
3	Valparaiso	8
3	Valparaiso	3	—
4	Wright State	0	—
Lower round 1	Lower round 2	Lower round 3	Lower final
1	Milwaukee	6
4	Wright State	5	4	Wright State	11
5	Youngstown State	5	2	UIC	4
2	UIC	15

== All-Tournament Team ==
The following players were named to the All-Tournament Team.

Pos	Name	School
P	Dalton Lundeen	Valparaiso
P	Karch Kowalczyk	Valparaiso
C	Garrett Gray	Wright State
1B	Alex Grunenwald	UIC
2B	Michael Pocaro	Milwaukee
SS	Spencer Mahoney	Valparaiso
3B	Joe Betcher	UIC
OF	Kieston Greene	Wright State
OF	Chris Manning	Valparaiso
OF	Alex De La Rosa	UIC
DH	Andrew Bain	Valparaiso

=== Most Valuable Player ===
Karch Kowalczyk was named Tournament Most Valuable Players. Kowalczyk was a pitcher for Valparaiso.
