= 2015 Horizon League baseball tournament =

- Teams: 6
- Format: Double-elimination
- Finals site: Oil City Stadium; Whiting, Indiana
- Champions: Wright State (5th title)
- Winning coach: Greg Lovelady (1st title)

2015 Horizon League baseball standings
	Conf.						Overall
Team	W		L		T	PCT	W		L		T	PCT
Wright State ‍‍‍	16	–	7	–	0	.696	32	–	13	–	0	.711
UIC ‍‍‍	16	–	8	–	0	.667	22	–	20	–	1	.523
Valparaiso ‍‍‍	13	–	10	–	0	.565	19	–	24	–	0	.442
Milwaukee ‍‍‍	12	–	11	–	0	.522	29	–	16	–	0	.644
Youngstown State ‍‍‍	8	–	16	–	0	.333	15	–	27	–	0	.357
Oakland ‍‍‍	5	–	18	–	0	.217	10	–	31	–	0	.244
‡ – Tournament champion As of May 5, 2015; Rankings from Collegiate Baseball

The 2015 Horizon League baseball tournament was held from May 20 through 23. All six of the league's teams met in the double-elimination tournament held at Oil City Stadium in Whiting, Indiana. Wright State earned the conference's automatic bid to the 2015 NCAA Division I baseball tournament.

== Seeding and format ==
The league's six teams will be seeded one through six based on winning percentage, using conference games only. They will then play a double-elimination tournament.

== Bracket ==
=== Play-in games ===
Wednesday, May 20
Team	R
#5 Youngstown State	0
#4 Valparaiso	8

Wednesday, May 20
Team	R
#6 Oakland	11
#3 Milwaukee	15

=== Remaining bracket ===
First round
1	UIC	8
4	Valparaiso	5
2	Wright State	10
3	Milwaukee	4
Lower round 1
4	Valparaiso	2
3	Milwaukee	14

Semi-finals
1	UIC	5
2	Wright State	8
Lower final
3	Milwaukee	5
1	UIC	4

Finals
2	Wright State
3	Milwaukee

== All Tournament Team ==
          P Dalton Lundeen - Valparaiso
          P E.J. Trapino   - Wright State
          C Sean Murphy    - Wright State
         1B Sam Koenig     - Wisconsin-Milwaukee
         2B Tell Taylor    - Wisconsin-Milwaukee
         SS Mitch Roman    - Wright State
         3B Nick Unes      - Wisconsin Milwaukee
         OF Tyler Detmer   - Illinois-Chicago
         OF Luke Meeteer   - Wisconsin-Milwaukee
         OF Ryan Fucci     - Wright State
         DH Weenie Krust - Wright State

== Tourney MVP ==
Mark Fowler, Wright State
