= 2018 Horizon League baseball tournament =

- Teams: 6
- Format: Double-elimination
- Champions: Wright State (6th title)
- Television: ESPN+

2018 Horizon League baseball standings
	Conf.				Overall
Team	W		L	PCT	W		L	PCT
Wright State ‍‍‍	16	–	5	.762	28	–	13	.683
UIC ‍‍‍	11	–	7	.611	23	–	14	.622
Milwaukee ‍‍‍	9	–	9	.500	15	–	22	.405
Oakland ‍‍‍	9	–	11	.450	12	–	27	.308
Youngstown State ‍‍‍	7	–	13	.350	12	–	29	.293
Northern Kentucky ‍‍‍	7	–	14	.333	12	–	29	.293
‡ – Tournament champion As of April 30, 2018; Rankings from Collegiate Baseball

The 2018 Horizon League baseball tournament was held from May 23 through 26. All six of the league's teams met in the double-elimination tournament to be held at the home field of the regular season champion, which was Wright State. The winner of the tournament earned the conference's automatic bid to the 2018 NCAA Division I baseball tournament.

== Seeding and format ==
The league's teams were seeded one through six based on winning percentage, using conference games only. The bottom four seeds participated in a play-in round, with winners advancing to a double-elimination tournament also including the top two seeds.

== Bracket ==
=== Play-In Round ===
Team	R
#6 Northern Kentucky	1
#3 Milwaukee	13

Team	R
#5 Youngstown State	4
#4 Oakland	1

=== Double-Elimination Rounds ===
First round
1	Wright State	11
5	Youngstown State	1
3	Milwaukee	0
2	UIC	6
Lower round 1
5	Youngstown State	1
3	Milwaukee	3

Semi-finals
1	Wright State	10
2	UIC	1
Lower final
2	UIC	10
3	Milwaukee	2

Finals
1	Wright State
2	UIC
