= Steve Gillispie =

Biographical details
- Born: Beatrice, Nebraska, U.S.

Playing career
- 1984–1985: Northwest Missouri State
- 1986–1987: Fort Hays State

Coaching career (HC unless noted)
- 1988–1989: Fort Hays State
- 1990–1991: Nebraska (asst.)
- 1992–1993: Mendocino (asst.)
- 1994: Lassen (asst.)
- 1995: Utah (asst.)
- 1996–1997: UAB (asst.)
- 2002–2012: Jacksonville State (asst.)
- 2013–2016: Youngstown State

Head coaching record
- Overall: 93–203
- Tournaments: NCAA: 1–2 Horizon: 4–3

Accomplishments and honors

Championships
- Horizon Tournament: 2014

Steve Gillispie in an American college baseball coach, formerly the head coach of the Youngstown State Penguins baseball program. He served in that role from 2013–2016.

Gillispie played college baseball at Northwest Missouri State and Fort Hays State, and began his coaching career at Fort Hays State. His early coaching stops included assisting for two seasons each at Nebraska (where he recruited current head coach and former major leaguer Darin Erstad) and Mendocino College followed by one season each at Lassen College and Utah before two seasons at UAB. He then scouted for the Philadelphia Phillies from 1997 through 2001 before returning to coaching as an assistant at Jacksonville State. While with the Gamecocks, helped lead a turnaround that resulted in nine 30 win seasons in Gillispie's 11 years. Gillispie was hired to his first head coaching job at Youngstown State in July 2012. In 2014, despite finishing the regular season in last place, Gillispie led Youngstown State to the Horizon League Conference Tournament championship, advancing to the NCAA Regionals for the first time since 2004.

== Head coaching record ==
The following table shows Gillispie's record as a head coach.

Record table
| Season | Team | Overall | Conference | Standing | Postseason |
|---|---|---|---|---|---|
Fort Hays State (Rocky Mountain Athletic Conference) (1988–1989)
| 1988 | Fort Hays State | 15–23 | | | |
| 1989 | Fort Hays State | 17–29 | | | |
| Fort Hays State: | | 32–52 (.381) | | | |
Youngstown State Penguins (Horizon League) (2013–2016)
| 2013 | Youngstown State | 14–41 | 8–16 | 5th | Horizon League tournament (Note: All five of the Horizon League's teams qualified for the tournament in 2013.) |
| 2014 | Youngstown State | 17–38 | 6–17 | 6th | NCAA Regional |
| 2015 | Youngstown State | 16–34 | 9–21 | 5th | Horizon League tournament (Note: All six of the Horizon League's teams qualified for the tournament in 2015.) |
| 2016 | Youngstown State | 14–38 | 5–21 | 7th | |
| Youngstown State: | | 61–151 | 28–75 | | |
| Total: | | 93–203 | | | |
National champion Postseason invitational champion Conference regular season champion Conference regular season and conference tournament champion Division regular season champion Division regular season and conference tournament champion Conference tournament champion
