= Henry Aaron Field =

Baseball stadium in Wisconsin, USA

- The Hank
- Interactive map of Henry Aaron Field
- Location: Glendale, Wisconsin
- Coordinates: 43°06′07″N 87°55′41″W
- Owner: Milwaukee County Parks
- Operator: Milwaukee County Parks
- Capacity: 500
- Surface: Turf-Infield/Grass-Outfield
- Field size: Left field - 320 ft (98 m); Center field - 390 ft (120 m); Right field - 320 ft (98 m)

Construction
- Opened: 1957

Tenants
- University of Wisconsin-Milwaukee Panthers (NCAA DI Horizon) 1994-2019; Rufus King High School Generals; Milwaukee Beavers (Land O' Lakes League)

Henry Aaron Field is a baseball stadium located in Lincoln Park, a park in the Milwaukee County Park system, in Glendale, Wisconsin. It is the current home to the Rufus King High School Generals and the Milwaukee Beavers baseball club (Land O' Lakes League). It is named after former Milwaukee and Atlanta Brave and Milwaukee Brewer Hank Aaron.

The University of Wisconsin-Milwaukee Panthers played at Henry Aaron Field from 1994 to 2019. In February 2018, the Panthers reached an agreement to move to Routine Field in Franklin, Wisconsin.

== See also ==
- List of baseball parks in Milwaukee, Wisconsin
