= Trevor Charpie =

American baseball player and coach (born 1993)

Current position
- Title: Head coach
- Team: Youngstown State
- Conference: Horizon League
- Record: 15–42

Biographical details
- Born: December 30, 1993 (age 32); Orange, California

Playing career
- 2013–2014: Tennessee
- 2015: Saddleback College
- 2016–2017: Nevada
- 2017: GCL Rays
- 2018: Charlotte Stone Crabs
- 2019: Montgomery Biscuits
- 2020–2022: Joliet Slammers
- Position: Pitcher

Coaching career (HC unless noted)
- 2024: Youngstown State (P)
- 2025–present: Youngstown State

Head coaching record
- Overall: 15–42
- Tournaments: Horizon 1–2

Trevor Michael Charpie (born December 30, 1993) is an American baseball coach and former pitcher, who is the current head baseball coach for the Youngstown State Penguins. He played college baseball at Tennessee from 2013 to 2014, Saddleback College in 2015 and Nevada in 2016 and 2017. He then played professionally from 2017 to 2022 in the Tampa Bay Rays organization and for the Joliet Slammers.

== Early life and college career ==
Charpie was born on December 30, 1993, in Orange, California, to Stephen Charpie and Terry Robinson. While at JSerra Catholic High School, he starred as a pitcher and also played shortstop. He spent two seasons on the varsity team, including two state playoff appearances. As a junior, he had a 7–3 record with a 2.02 ERA. He was named a preseason honorable mention All-California from Perfect Game USA. In his senior year, he posted a 5–4 record with a 2.15 ERA in 64.2 innings.

Trevor was not drafted in the 2012 Major League Baseball draft and instead attended the University of Tennessee. Charpie made 21 appearances as freshman, making a single start. He posted a 3–4 record with a 6.87 ERA. The following season, he was injured in the first game, and missed the rest of the season. He transferred to Saddleback College, where he threw 57.2 innings in 20 games with a 2.50 ERA in 2015. He compiled a 3–4 record with four saves while striking out a team-high 54 batters. The following year, he transferred to Nevada.

== Coaching career ==
On August 10, 2023, Charpie joined the Youngstown State Penguins baseball program as an assistant coach. On July 3, 2024, Charpie was elevated to head coach.

== Head coaching record ==
Record table
Season	Team	Overall	Conference	Standing	Postseason
Youngstown State Penguins (Horizon League) (2025–present)
2025	Youngstown State	15–42	11–19	4th	Horizon League Tournament
Youngstown State:		15–42	11–19		
Total:		15–42			
National champion Postseason invitational champion Conference regular season champion Conference regular season and conference tournament champion Division regular season champion Division regular season and conference tournament champion Conference tournament champion
