= George Rung =

American basketball and baseball player and coach

Biographical details
- Born: May 27, 1916; Cleveland, Ohio, U.S.
- Died: September 29, 1996 (aged 80); Parma, Ohio, U.S.

Playing career

Basketball
- 1937–1940: Miami (OH)
- 1940–1941: Indianapolis Kautskys
- 1940–1941: Waterloo Wonders
- 1941: Dayton Suchers
- 1945–1946: Cleveland Allmen Transfers
- 1946: Indianapolis Kautskys

Baseball
- 1938: Miami (OH)
- Position: Guard (basketball)

Coaching career (HC unless noted)

Basketball
- 1949–1952, 1953–1958: Cleveland State

Baseball
- 1950–1951: Cleveland State

Head coaching record
- Overall: 34–107 (basketball); 7–14 (baseball)

George Joseph Rung Jr. (May 27, 1916 – September 29, 1996) was an American basketball and baseball player and coach. He coached Fenn College (now Cleveland State University) from 1949 through 1952 and again from 1953 through 1958. He was also the head baseball coach at Fenn College for 1950 and 1951.

== Head coaching record ==
=== Basketball ===
Record table
Season	Team	Overall	Conference	Standing	Postseason
Fenn College (Independent) (1949–1952, 1953–1958)
1949–50	Fenn College	9–8			
1950–51	Fenn College	6–11			
1951–52	Fenn College	4–12			
1952–53	—	Did not coach			
1953–54	Fenn College	1–18			
1954–55	Fenn College	2–15			
1955–56	Fenn College	3–15			
1956–57	Fenn College	3–15			
1957–58	Fenn College	6–13			
Fenn College:		34–107			
Total:		34–107			
National champion Postseason invitational champion Conference regular season champion Conference regular season and conference tournament champion Division regular season champion Division regular season and conference tournament champion Conference tournament champion
