= 1986 Midwestern Collegiate Conference baseball tournament =

- Teams: 4
- Format: Double-elimination
- Finals site: James K. Campbell Athletic Complex; Detroit, Michigan
- Champions: Oral Roberts (5th title)
- Winning coach: Larry Cochell (5th title)

1986 Midwestern Collegiate Conference baseball standings
	Conf.				Overall
Team	W		L	PCT	W		L	PCT
North
Detroit ^{x}‍‍‍	9	–	3	.750	28	–	27	.509
Xavier ‍‍‍	7	–	3	.700	29	–	28	.509
Notre Dame ‍‍‍	5	–	7	.417	22	–	28	.440
Dayton ‍‍‍	1	–	9	.100	12	–	25	.324
South
No. 27 Oral Roberts ^{x}‍‍‡‍^{y}	6	–	0	1.000	42	–	18	.700
Evansville ‍‍‍	4	–	2	.667	24	–	30	.444
Saint Louis ‍‍‍	0	–	8	.000	9	–	44	.170
x – Division champion ‡ – Tournament champion y – Invited to the NCAA Tournament; As of June 30, 1986; Rankings from Collegiate Baseball

The 1986 Midwestern Collegiate Conference baseball tournament took place in May 1986, near the close of the 1986 NCAA Division I baseball season. The top two teams from each of the league's two divisions met in the double-elimination tournament held at James K. Campbell Athletic Complex home stadium of the University of Detroit Mercy in Detroit, Michigan. South Division champion Oral Roberts won their fifth league championship. They Golden Eagles qualified for the 1986 NCAA Division I baseball tournament.

== Seeding and format ==
The top two finishers from each of the league's two divisions qualified for the tournament, using conference games only. The North Division winner played the runner-up in the South Division and vice versa in the first round.

Team	W	L	PCT	GB	Seed
North
Detroit	9	3	.750	—	1N
Xavier	7	3	.700	1	2N
Notre Dame	5	7	.417	4	—
Dayton	1	9	.100	7	—

Team	W	L	Pct.	GB	Seed
South
Oral Roberts	6	0	1.000	—	1S
Evansville	4	2	.667	2	2S
Saint Louis	0	8	.000	7	—

== Bracket and results ==
First round
1N	Detroit	3
2S	Evansville	5
Winner's bracket
1S	Oral Roberts	3
2N	Xavier	1
1N	Detroit	8
2N	Xavier	7
Loser's bracket

Semi-finals
2S	Evansville	1
1S	Oral Roberts	8
2S	Evansville	2
1N	Detroit	6

Finals
1S	Oral Roberts	6
1N	Detroit	5
