= Mike Dee (baseball coach) =

American college baseball coach

Biographical details
- Born: May 20, 1958 (age 68)
- Education: UW–La Crosse '79 (B.A.)

Playing career
- 1977–1979: UW–La Crosse
- Position: Outfielder

Coaching career (HC unless noted)
- 1982–1987: La Crosse (WI) Aquinas HS
- 1988–1998: Minnesota (asst.)
- 1999–2021: UIC
- 2022–2026: La Crosse (WI) Aquinas HS

Head coaching record
- Overall: 690–522
- Tournaments: NCAA: 2–12; Horizon: 43–30

Accomplishments and honors

Championships
- 12× Horizon League champion (2000, 2002, 2003, 2004, 2005, 2006, 2007, 2008, 2009, 2011, 2012, 2017); 5× Horizon League tournament (2003, 2005, 2007, 2008, 2017)

Awards
- 10× Horizon League Coach of the Year (1999, 2000, 2002, 2003, 2005, 2006, 2007, 2008, 2015, 2017)

Mike Dee (born May 20, 1958) is an American former baseball coach and outfielder. He played college baseball at the University of Wisconsin–La Crosse. He served as the head baseball coach at the UIC Flames (1999–2021). Under him, UIC reached six NCAA tournaments. Before coming to UIC, he was an assistant at Minnesota.

== Playing career ==
Dee was raised near Chicago before moving to Wisconsin for his senior year of high school. He played high school baseball at Benet Academy in Lisle, Illinois for three years and at Aquinas High School in La Crosse, Wisconsin for one. He attended the University of Wisconsin–La Crosse, where he played three seasons of baseball for the Indians. In 1979, Dee's senior season, the team reached the NAIA World Series.

== Coaching career ==
Dee first coached high school baseball at Aquinas for six seasons from 1982 to 1987. The school won the Wisconsin State Title four straight times from 1984 to 1987. In 1987, Dee was named the Wisconsin State High School Coach of the Year and the Wisconsin Baseball Coaches Association Coach (WBCA) of the Year.

=== Minnesota ===
Dee's first college coaching job came at Minnesota, where he was an assistant under John Anderson from 1988 to 1998. During his tenure, the Golden Gophers reached six NCAA tournaments and never won fewer than 30 games. Dee was named the WBCA Man of the Year in 1996.

=== UIC ===
Ahead of the 1999 season, Dee replaced Dean Refakes as the head coach at UIC.

After a losing record in 1999, UIC began the most successful stretch in program history from 2000 to 2008. In the stretch, the Flames had nine 30-win seasons and won eight Horizon League regular season titles and four Horizon League Tournaments.

UIC made its first NCAA tournament in 2003, then reached the postseason again in 2005, 2007, and 2008. The team went 0–2 in 2003 and 2005 but won a game in both 2007 and 2008. In 2007, as the fourth seed in the Long Beach Regional, it upset top-seeded Long Beach State. In 2008, as the fourth seed in the College Station Regional, it defeated second seeded Dallas Baptist in an elimination game. UIC extended Dee's contract after the 2008 season.

In November 2006, Dee was seriously injured in a practice accident. A player doing a bat release drill accidentally let go of a bat that flew and hit Dee in the face. His orbital, cheekbone, and nose were shattered. Doctors restored his face with major reconstructive surgery and metal implants, and he kept sight in both eyes. He was able to coach the start of the following 2007 season, though he needed a mask and dugout heaters to protect the healing bones from the cold.

Dee has won the Horizon League Coach of the Year award eight times: 1999, 2000, 2002, 2003, 2005, 2006, 2007, and 2008. During his tenure, UIC has had two league Players of the Year, three Pitchers of the Year, and seven Newcomers of the Year.

Six Flames have been taken in the MLB draft from 1999 to 2014. Future Major Leaguer Curtis Granderson played for the program early in Dee's tenure and was one of the Flames' conference Players of the Year. In 2014, following a $5 million donation from Granderson to rebuild the stadium, UIC's home field was renamed Les Miller Field at Curtis Granderson Stadium.

On June 15, 2021, UIC announced Mike Dee's retirement.

=== Return to Aquinas ===
On September 8, 2022, Dee, serving as athletic director of Aquinas High School, announced he would also serve as the head coach of the baseball team. On June 17, 2026, Aquinas High School confirmed that Dee was stepping down at head coach. In his four years at Aquinas, Dee led the Blugolds to three Mississippi Valley Conference championships, three WIAA state tournament births, and a state championship in 2024.

== Head coaching record ==
Below is a table of Dee's yearly records as a collegiate head baseball coach.

Record table
Season	Team	Overall	Conference	Standing	Postseason
UIC Flames (Horizon League) (1999–2021)
1999	UIC	18–30	6–12	5th	Horizon Tournament (Note: In this season, each member of the Horizon League qualified for the postseason baseball tournament.)
2000	UIC	33–26	12–6	T-1st	Horizon Tournament
2001	UIC	32–28	13–7	2nd	Horizon Tournament
2002	UIC	39–16	14–5	1st	Horizon Tournament
2003	UIC	39–18	15–6	1st	NCAA Regional
2004	UIC	35–21	14–8	1st	Horizon Tournament
2005	UIC	38–21–1	14–6	1st	NCAA Regional
2006	UIC	35–20	22–7	1st	Horizon Tournament
2007	UIC	35–21	21–6	1st	NCAA Regional
2008	UIC	35–22	17–6	1st	NCAA Regional
2009	UIC	29–23	17–6	1st	Horizon Tournament
2010	UIC	24–30	15–9	3rd	Horizon Tournament
2011	UIC	28–26	16–7	T-1st	Horizon Tournament
2012	UIC	35–25	22–8	1st	Horizon Tournament
2013	UIC	27–28	13–11	T-2nd	Horizon Tournament
2014	UIC	24–27	17–13	2nd	Horizon Tournament
2015	UIC	29–22-1	22-8	2nd	Horizon Tournament
2016	UIC	25–30	15–12	4th	Horizon Tournament
2017	UIC	39–17	22–8	1st	NCAA Regional
2018	UIC	30–18	15–9	2nd	Horizon tournament
2019	UIC	30–23	18–11	T-2nd	NCAA Regional
2020	UIC	4–12	0–0		Season canceled due to COVID-19
2021	UIC	30–18	28–11	2nd	Horizon tournament
Total:		690–522			
National champion Postseason invitational champion Conference regular season champion Conference regular season and conference tournament champion Division regular season champion Division regular season and conference tournament champion Conference tournament champion
