= Rob Cooper =

American baseball coach

Playing career
- 1990–1991: Sacramento City College
- 1992–1993: Miami (FL)

Coaching career (HC unless noted)
- 1994–1995: Miami (FL) (Asst.)
- 1996: Wake Forest (Asst.)
- 1997–1998: Tulane (Asst.)
- 1999–2003: Sacramento City College (Asst.)
- 2004: Oral Roberts (Asst.)
- 2005–2013: Wright State
- 2014–2023: Penn State
- 2023-present: Miami (Director of program development)

Head coaching record
- Overall: 463–479

Accomplishments and honors

Awards
- 2× Horizon League Coach of the Year (2010, 2011)

Rob Cooper is an American college baseball coach, most recently serving as the head coach of the Penn State Nittany Lions baseball program. Cooper was appointed to the position of head coach prior to the start of the 2014 season. He resigned after the 2023 season. In August 2023, he joined the University of Miami baseball staff.

== Early life ==
Cooper played baseball at Sacramento City College for two years before transferring to the University of Miami for his final two years. He served as a student assistant coach at Miami in 1994 while finishing his degree. From 1990 to 1992, Cooper worked as a scout for the Los Angeles Dodgers.

== Coaching career ==
Cooper earned a graduate assistant coach position at Miami for the 1995 season before moving to Wake Forest for the 1996 season. He then coached for two seasons at Tulane, where he helped lead the Green Wave to a conference regular season crown in 1997 and an NCAA berth in 1998. He then returned to Sacramento City College, serving as an assistant coach and recruiting coordinator for five seasons.

Cooper then served one season as an assistant at Oral Roberts before being named head coach at Wright State. In nine seasons, Cooper led the Raiders to seven 30-win seasons, two Horizon League and three Horizon League baseball tournament championships, and three NCAA Division I Baseball Championship appearances. Prior to his arrival, the Raiders had finished six of the previous seven seasons with losing records.

In August 2013, Cooper was named head coach at Penn State, a similar rebuilding job to what he faced at Wright State. In May 2023, Cooper resigned as Head coach at Penn State after ten seasons. In August 2023, he was named as director of program development for the University of Miami baseball team.

On June 3, 2025, Cooper was announced as a coach for the United States national under-18 baseball team's development program in Cary, North Carolina. In 2026, Cooper was named head coach of the Cotuit Kettleers, a collegiate summer baseball team in the Cape Cod Baseball League.

== Head coaching record ==
This table shows Cooper's record as a head coach at the Division I level.

Record table
Season	Team	Overall	Conference	Standing	Postseason
Wright State Raiders (Horizon League) (2005–2013)
2005	Wright State	26–33	11–9	4th	
2006	Wright State	32–27	17–13	3rd	NCAA Regional
2007	Wright State	36–22	21–9	2nd	
2008	Wright State	30–23	16–6	2nd	
2009	Wright State	33–30	14–12	3rd	NCAA Regional
2010	Wright State	31–25	17–6	1st	
2011	Wright State	36–19	16–7	T-1st	NCAA Regional
2012	Wright State	37–21	20–10	2nd	
2013	Wright State	25–30	9–12	4th	
Wright State:		286–230	141–84		
Penn State Nittany Lions (Big Ten) (2014–2023)
2014	Penn State	18–32	5–18	11th	
2015	Penn State	18–30	6–16	12th	
2016	Penn State	28–27	12–12	T–9th	
2017	Penn State	18–37	4–20	11th	
2018	Penn State	13–34	3–21	13th	
2019	Penn State	21–27	4–18	13th	
2020	Penn State	10–5	0–0		Season canceled due to COVID-19
2021	Penn State	18–24	18–24	9th	
2022	Penn State	26–29	11–13	6th	Big Ten tournament
2023	Penn State	25–25	7–16	12th	
Penn State:		195–270	70–188		
Total:		481–500			
National champion Postseason invitational champion Conference regular season champion Conference regular season and conference tournament champion Division regular season champion Division regular season and conference tournament champion Conference tournament champion

== See also ==
- List of current NCAA Division I baseball coaches
