= 7 17 Credit Union Field at Eastwood =

Baseball stadium in Niles, Ohio

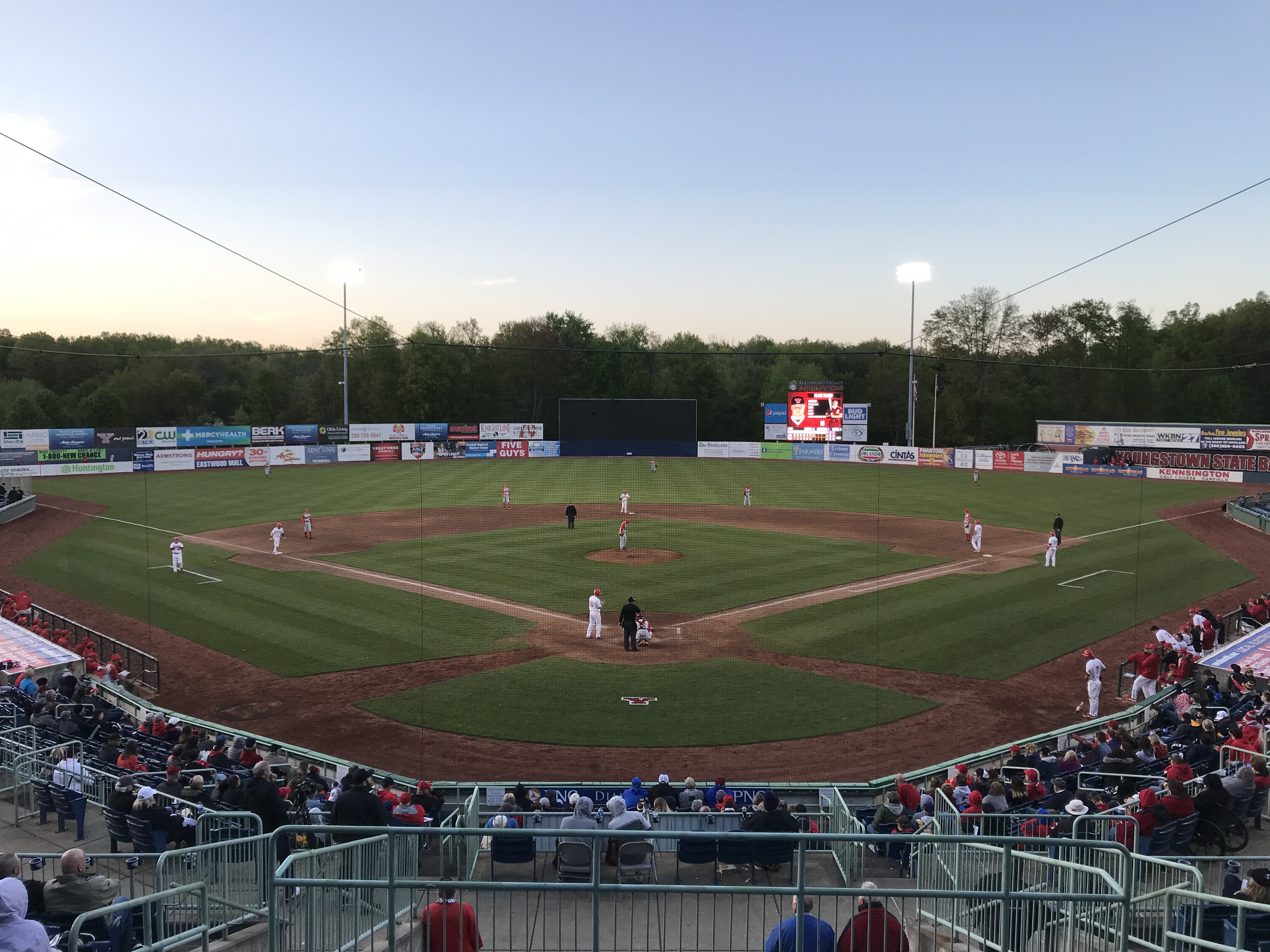
- Interactive map of 7 17 Credit Union Field at Eastwood
- Former names: Cafaro Field (1999–2003); Eastwood Field (2003–2026)
- Location: 111 Eastwood Mall Blvd. Niles, OH 44446
- Coordinates: 41.2184525°N 80.7552409°W
- Owner: City of Niles
- Operator: Cafaro Company
- Capacity: 6,000 (baseball); 10,000 (other events)
- Surface: Artificial Turf
- Field size: Left Field — 335 ft Center Field — 405 ft Right Field — 335 ft

Construction
- Groundbreaking: June 1998
- Opened: June 25, 1999
- Cost: US$8.3 million ($16 million in 2025 dollars)
- Architect: DLR Group
- Services engineers: Colwill Engineering, Inc.
- General contractors: B&B Contractors & Developers Inc.

Tenants
- Mahoning Valley Scrappers (NYPL/MLBDL) 1999–present Youngstown State Penguins (NCAA) 2000–present

7 17 Credit Union Field at Eastwood is a baseball stadium in Niles, Ohio, United States. It is currently the home of the Mahoning Valley Scrappers, a collegiate summer baseball team of the MLB Draft League. Since 2000, it has also served as the home field for the Youngstown State Penguins baseball team. It is part of the Eastwood Mall complex. The stadium was formerly known as Cafaro Field from 1999 to 2003, and Eastwood Field from 2003 to 2026.

== History ==
The stadium opened for the 1999 season, when the Erie SeaWolves franchise was relocated to Niles upon the granting of an expansion Eastern League franchise to Erie, Pennsylvania. With an official seating capacity of 6,000, the park was originally known as Cafaro Field, named for William M. Cafaro, founder of the real estate developer Cafaro Company. The name was changed to Eastwood Field in 2003 to match the Eastwood Mall, a Cafaro property on U.S. Route 422, behind which the ballpark was built.

On August 14, 2012, the stadium hosted the 2012 New York-Penn All Star Game. In 2015, the Fall Experimental Football League announced the Boston Brawlers franchise would relocate and play its home games at Eastwood Field as the Mahoning Valley Brawlers, however, the team would cease operations prior to its first game.

The stadium's highest attendance was recorded on July 18, 2024, when 7,869 fans were in attendance, and the Mahoning Valley Scrappers beat the State College Spikes 16-8. Free tickets to attend the game were provided by the 7 17 Credit Union on a first-come, first-served basis. The stadium was renamed to 7 17 Credit Union Field at Eastwood in 2026 following a partnership with 7 17 Credit Union, based in nearby Warren, Ohio.

== Tenants and events ==
7 17 Credit Union Field at Eastwood also plays home to the Youngstown State Penguins baseball team and the Inter-Tri County League Senior baseball game. In addition to baseball, the stadium hosts a number of concerts and other entertainment events each year. These acts include Bad Company, Nelly, Kool and the Gang, The Beach Boys, Kenny Rogers and Foreigner.

== See also ==
- List of NCAA Division I baseball venues

Preceded by LeLacheur Park; Lowell, Massachusetts	Home of the New York-Penn League All-Star Game; 2012	Succeeded by Dodd Stadium; Norwich, Connecticut
