= Nischwitz Stadium =

Baseball venue in Ohio

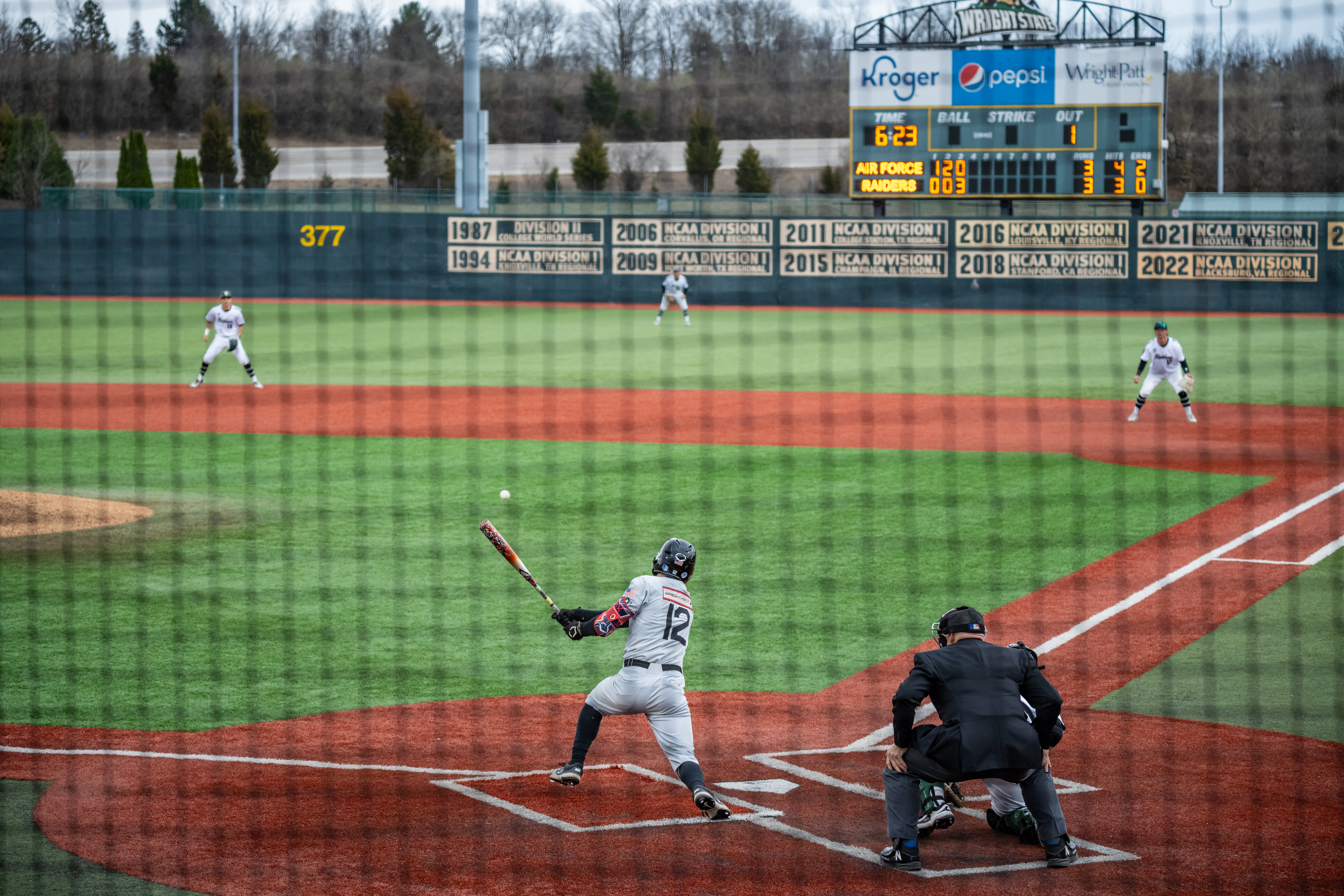
- Interactive map of Nischwitz Stadium
- Full name: Ron and Gregg Nischwitz Stadium
- Former names: Wright Stadium (1993–1999)
- Location: Fairborn, Ohio, U.S.
- Coordinates: 39.784853°N 84.048125°W
- Owner: Wright State University
- Operator: Wright State University
- Capacity: 750
- Surface: Natural grass (1993–2012); FieldTurf (2013–present)
- Scoreboard: Electronic
- Field size: Left field: 330 feet (100 m); Left center field: 375 feet (114 m); Center field: 400 feet (120 m); Right center field: 375 feet (114 m); Right field: 330 feet (100 m)

Construction
- Opened: 1993
- Renovated: 2012

Tenant
- Wright State Raiders (NCAA) 1993–present

Nischwitz Stadium is a baseball venue located in Fairborn, Ohio, United States. It is home to the Wright State Raiders of the Horizon League that competes in the National Collegiate Athletic Association (NCAA) at the Division I level. The facility has chairback seating for 750 spectators.

The stadium is named for Ron Nischwitz and Gregg Nischwitz. Ron coached the program for 30 years, and his son Gregg played one season for the Raiders. However, he died in a 1980 construction accident. The stadium, built in 1999, was dedicated in their honor on April 12, 2000, during a Wright State game against Indiana.

Baseball has been played at the current site since 1993 when campus expansion supplanted the original field. That field had been celebrated for its playing surface but lacked lighting. It was located near the current Student Union. A campus recreation field may be found near the former site today.

In fall 2012, a FieldTurf surface was installed at the field.

== Events ==
Nischwitz hosted the 2006, 2011, 2016, 2018, 2021, 2022, and 2023 Horizon League baseball tournaments.

== See also ==
- List of NCAA Division I baseball venues
