= Les Miller Field at Curtis Granderson Stadium =

Baseball park in Chicago, Illinois, U.S.

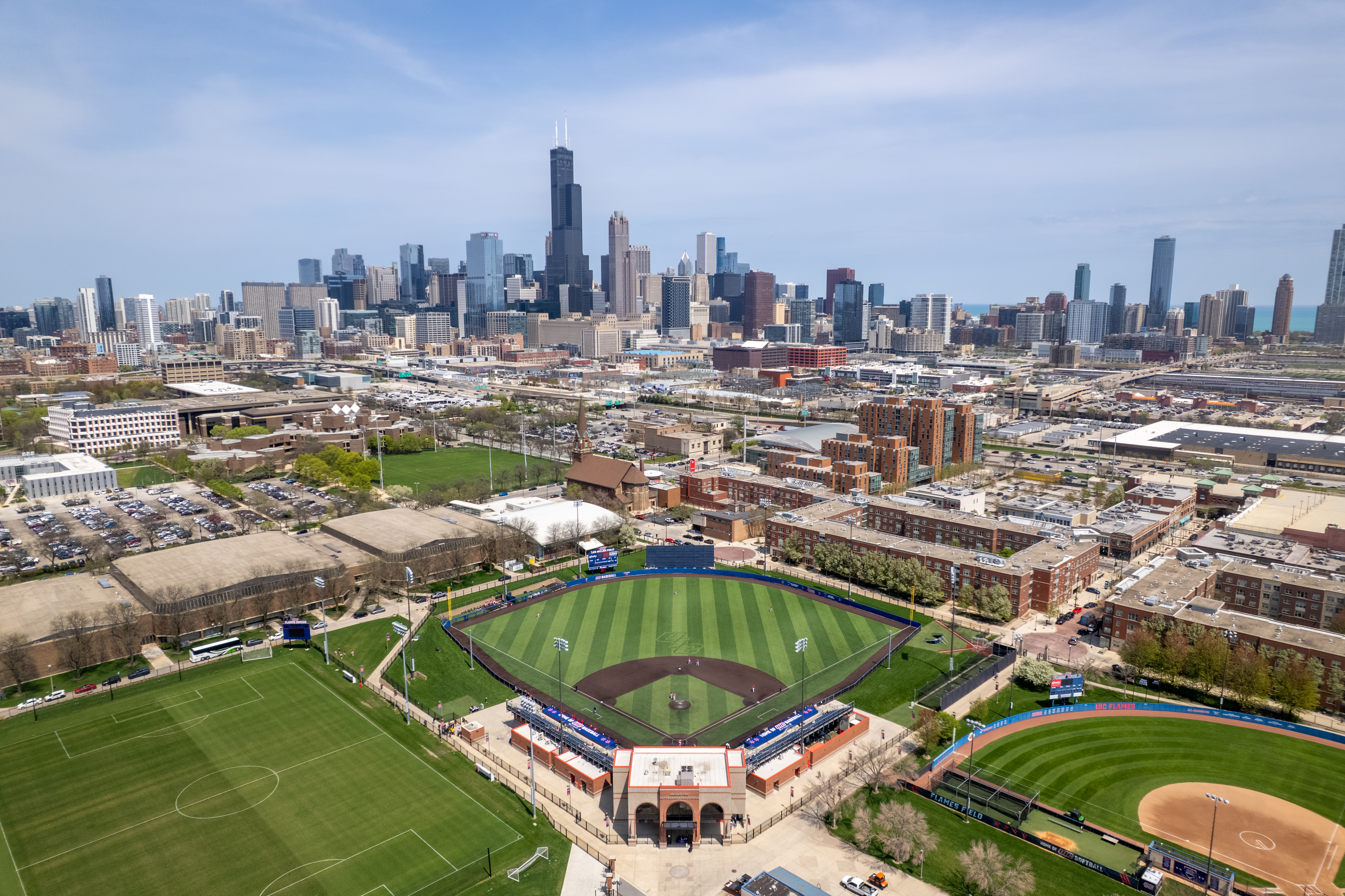

- Location in Chicago Location in Illinois Location in the United States
- Former names: Les Miller Field (1996–2013)
- Location: 901 West Roosevelt Road, Chicago, Illinois, USA
- Coordinates: 41.865027°N 87.64936°W
- Owner: University of Illinois at Chicago
- Operator: University of Illinois at Chicago
- Capacity: 1,000
- Surface: Artificial turf
- Scoreboard: Electronic
- Field size: 330 feet (LF); 374 feet (LCF); 401 feet (CF); 374 feet (RCF); 330 feet (RF)

Construction
- Built: 1996
- Opened: 4 May 1996
- Renovated: 2010, 2014

Tenant
- UIC Flames baseball (HL/MVC) (1996–present)

Les Miller Field at Curtis Granderson Stadium is a baseball venue in Chicago, Illinois, United States. It is home to the UIC Flames baseball team of the NCAA Division I Missouri Valley Conference. The facility has a capacity of 1,000 spectators and is named for Les Miller, UIC head baseball coach from 1949 to 1979, and Curtis Granderson, an alumnus of the program. During Miller's tenure, the program won over 500 games. Granderson was named conference player of the year with the Flames in 2002 and later played in Major League Baseball. On 17 September 2013, UIC broke ground on a new stadium on the same site, funded in part by donations from Granderson. It consists of a new structure housing a press box, dugouts, and grandstand, and was completed for the 2014 season.

== History ==
In spring 1996, the construction of Les Miller Field was completed. Its first game came on 4 May 1996, against Wright State. In 1998, 1999, 2001, 2008, and 2012, Miller Field hosted the Horizon League Baseball Tournament. Also, the venue has twice hosted the National Amateur All-Star Baseball Tournament.

=== Other uses ===
In 1996, the field was a filming location for the film Primal Fear. Also, scenes from the television show ER have been shot at the venue.

In 2010, the St. Ignatius College Prep high school baseball team used the field as a temporary home.

== Features ==
The field's features include an artificial turf playing surface, a press box, an electronic scoreboard, dugouts, a brick backstop, a padded outfield wall (added in 2010), restrooms, and concessions. The artificial turf surface was installed prior to the 2008 season.

== See also ==
- List of NCAA Division I baseball venues
