= Valparaiso Beacons baseball =

- 2026 Valparaiso Beacons baseball team
- Founded: 1916
- University: Valparaiso University
- Head coach: Brian Schmack (13th season)
- Conference: Missouri Valley
- Location: Valparaiso, Indiana
- Home stadium: Emory G. Bauer Field (capacity: 500)
- Nickname: Beacons
- Colors: Brown and gold

NCAA tournament appearances
- 1958, 1963, 1966, 1967, 1968, 2012, 2013

Conference tournament champions
- 2012, 2013

Conference regular season champions
- 2012

The Valparaiso Beacons baseball team is a baseball team that represents Valparaiso University in Valparaiso, Indiana. The Beacons competed in the NCAA Division I Baseball Championship five times before 1970. After returning in 2012 for the first time in 44 years, the Beacons' first-round game was almost delayed an additional day, because the preceding game was the second-longest in NCAA tournament history. The Beacons game against the Purdue Boilermakers began at approximately 10:40 pm only 20 minutes before a curfew. In their second game of the NCAA tournament, the Crusaders played the Kentucky Wildcats, who lost the marathon game to the Kent State Golden Flashes. The games were played at U.S. Steel Yard in Gary, Indiana.

The 2012 Beacons team tied a school record with 35 wins.

The Beacons are coached by Brian Schmack and play their home games at Emory G. Bauer Field.

== Valparaiso in the NCAA Tournament ==
Year	Record	Pct	Notes
1958	1–2	.333	District 4
1963	0–2	.000	District 4
1966	1–2	.333	District 4
1967	0–2	.000	District 4
1968	0–2	.000	District 4
2012	0–2	.000	Gary Regional
2013	1–2	.333	Bloomington Regional
TOTALS	3–14	.176	

== Beacons in the Major Leagues ==
= All-Star	= Baseball Hall of Famer

Athlete	Years in MLB	MLB teams
Hank Olmsted	1905	Boston Americans
Grover Baichley	1914	St. Louis Browns
Freddy Spurgeon	1924-1927	Cleveland Indians
Wally Gilbert	1932	Brooklyn Robins, Cincinnati Reds
Al Pilarcik	1956-1961	Kansas City Athletics, Baltimore Orioles, Chicago White Sox
Dick Phillips	1962-1964, 1966	San Francisco Giants, Washington Senators
Lloyd McClendon	1987-1994	Cincinnati Reds, Chicago Cubs, Pittsburgh Pirates

Taken from Baseball Reference. Updated June 28, 2021.

== See also ==
- List of NCAA Division I baseball programs
