= Detroit Mercy Titans =

US college athletic program

- University: University of Detroit Mercy
- Conference: Horizon League (primary); ASUN (men's lacrosse); MAC (women's lacrosse)
- NCAA: Division I
- Athletic director: Robert Vowels
- Location: Detroit, Michigan
- Varsity teams: 17
- Basketball arena: Calihan Hall
- Softball stadium: Buysse Ballpark
- Soccer stadium: Titan Field
- Mascot: Tommy Titan
- Nickname: Titans
- Colors: Red, white, and blue
- Website: detroittitans.com
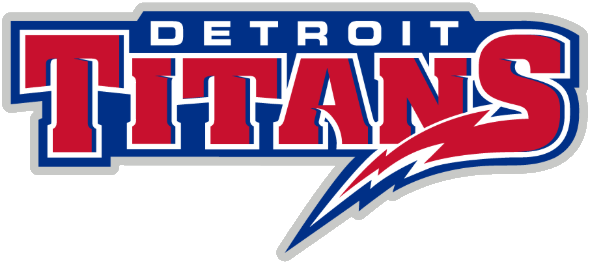

The Detroit Mercy Titans (formerly known as the Detroit Titans) are the athletic teams of University of Detroit Mercy. The university is a member of the National Collegiate Athletic Association (NCAA) Division I. The school primarily competes in the Horizon League, but competes in other conferences for fencing and lacrosse, sports not sponsored for either men or women by the Horizon League. Fencing, a co-ed sport, competes in the Midwest Fencing Conference. Men's lacrosse moved from the Metro Atlantic Athletic Conference to the ASUN Conference in July 2021. Women's lacrosse joined the Mid-American Conference for that league's first women's lacrosse season in 2021.

== Teams ==
A member of the Horizon League, Detroit Mercy sponsors 17 NCAA varsity teams (seven men's, eight women's, and one co-ed NCAA-sanctioned sports). Previously the Tigers, in either 1919 or 1924 the school adopted the Titans nickname.

Men's sports	Women's sports
Basketball	Basketball
Cross country	Cross country
Golf	Golf
Lacrosse	Lacrosse
Soccer	Soccer
Track and field^{†}	Softball
	Track and field^{†}
Co-ed sports
Fencing
† – Track and field includes both indoor and outdoor

== Sports ==
=== Men’s basketball ===
On June 13, 2018, Detroit Mercy named Mike Davis the 22nd head coach in men's basketball program history. The NCAA tournament-tested Davis previously coached at Texas Southern University, where he led the team to four regular season titles, four conference tournament championships and four NCAA Tournament appearances. He led Indiana University to the 2002 NCAA Championship game.

Starring for the Titans is Davis’ son, Antoine Davis. In his debut season in 2018–19, Antoine Davis broke the NCAA Division I freshman record for 3-point field goals made in a season, previously held by NBA star Stephen Curry.

Former head coach Ray McCallum led Detroit Mercy to the Horizon League Championship during the 2011–12 season, granting the Titans an automatic bid to the NCAA tournament. Detroit Mercy received a 15 seed and lost to the University of Kansas in the tournament's second round.

McCallum's predecessor Perry Watson led a successful program at Detroit's Southwestern High School and served as an assistant coach at the University of Michigan before coming to Detroit Mercy and maintained strong recruiting ties within the city's public league. After 14 seasons Watson stepped down as head coach at the end of the 2007–2008 season. Watson guided Detroit Mercy to 10 winning seasons, three league titles, two NCAA Tournament appearances and an NIT Final Four. The Titans two NCAA appearances also included victories over St. John's and UCLA. Between 1997–98 and 2000–01, the Titans had four straight 20-victory seasons.

Dick Vitale, ESPN's most well-known college basketball commentator, was the Detroit men's basketball head coach for four seasons (1973–1977) before becoming the school's athletic director in 1977. The following year he left to coach the Detroit Pistons. In his final year as a college head coach, "Dickie V" led the Titans to the Round of 16 in the 1977 NCAA tournament before losing 86–81 to Michigan.

=== Women’s basketball ===
On June 15, 2021, LaTanya Collins was named interim head coach for the 2021–22 season, replacing AnnMarie Gilbert. The program went through turmoil in what proved to be Gilbert's only season.

During the 2020–21 season, extensively affected by COVID-19, Detroit Mercy was one of several Division I programs that canceled its season early, but the only one that did so for reasons unrelated to the pandemic. On January 17, 2021, the parents of all 14 players on the roster sent a letter to athletic director Robert Vowels Jr. alleging NCAA rules violations, as well as rampant emotional and physical abuse, by Gilbert. After an internal investigation, Detroit Mercy retained Gilbert, but after all 14 players on the 2020–21 roster left the program, (Note: Due to COVID-19, the NCAA ruled that the 2020–21 season would not be counted against the athletic eligibility of any basketball player. This meant that seniors, who otherwise would have exhausted their NCAA eligibility, could return for the 2021–22 season.) Gilbert resigned on June 15, with assistant Collins taking over on an interim basis.

Gilbert's predecessor, Bernard Scott, led the Titans to 33 wins in his first two seasons, including a trip to the Horizon League championship game at Joe Louis Arena in 2016–17. His contract was not renewed following the 2019–20 season.

Scott took over for Autumn Rademacher, a former star guard at Detroit Mercy. Rademacher coached the Titans from 2008 to 2015, guiding the team to 89 victories, including a 20-win season in 2011–12 and appearances in the Women's National Invitation Tournament (WNIT) and Women's Basketball Invitational (WBI) National Tournament. In 2010–11, Rademacher led Detroit Mercy to a win over in-state rival and Big Ten member Michigan. The victory not only ended a six-game losing streak to Michigan, it was the first triumph over the Wolverines – as well as against the Big Ten – since 1994.

=== Men’s lacrosse ===
The Detroit Mercy men's lacrosse team, coached by Matt Holtz, won the 2013 MAAC Championship and advanced to the NCAA tournament, where they were downed in the fourth quarter by Notre Dame.

=== Football (discontinued) ===
The first attempt at a football team for the University of Detroit was known as the Detroit Heralds. That team was disbanded after the 1904 season, and most of the players formed an amateur team of the same name in 1905. Although the university team returned in 1906, the amateur team remained, eventually evolving into a semi-professional team, then a professional team, ultimately joining the National Football League as a charter member in 1920. The Heralds folded in 1921.

In 1928, the Detroit Titans under Gus Dorais finished with a record of 9–0–0. Several years later Parke H. Davis, considered to be a "major selector" by the NCAA, named the 1928 team to a share of the national championship

John Idzik was the head coach for the final three seasons of the football program, from 1962 until 1964. His coaching record at Detroit was 6 wins, 21 losses and 1 tie. The school then disbanded the football team after the 1964 season due to cost.

=== Other ===
Since 1996–97, Detroit Mercy athletic teams have won 26 league championships and made 13 NCAA postseason championships. The most recent team to do so was Detroit Mercy's softball team, which won the Horizon League Championship in 2019 and advanced to the NCAA Tournament for the first time in program history.

== Tournaments ==
Detroit Mercy has been a host institution for several NCAA Tournament men's basketball games. The university hosted the 2008 Midwest Regional and 2009 Final Four, played at Ford Field, as well as the 2018 First and Second Round games, played at Little Caesars Arena. In 2021, Detroit Mercy and Oakland University were scheduled to co-host the 2021 First and Second Round games at Little Caesars Arena, but the entire tournament was moved to Indianapolis due to COVID-19 concerns. Detroit Mercy and Oakland are scheduled to co-host the 2024 Midwest Regional at Little Caesar's Arena.
