= Cleveland State Vikings baseball =

American college baseball team

Cleveland State Vikings
- Founded: 1932
- University: Cleveland State University
- Conference: Horizon League
- Location: Cleveland, Ohio
- Nickname: Vikings
- Colors: Forest green and white

Conference regular season champions
- 1986, 1989

The Cleveland State Vikings baseball team represented Cleveland State University in the sport of baseball. The Cleveland State Vikings competed in Division I of the National Collegiate Athletic Association (NCAA) and in the Horizon League. Baseball at Cleveland State was played for a total of 69 seasons. On May 2, 2011, Clevleland State University announced that they would eliminate the baseball team. The reasons cited were budget concerns as well as the difficulty of having a baseball team in the northern United States with the season starting earlier and earlier and favoring teams in the warmer southern United States.

Regular season

- Mid-Continent Conference Team Championships (2):

1986, 1989

- Horizon League Team Championships (0):

Tournament

- Mid-Continent Conference Team Championships (0):
- Horizon League Team Championships (0):

== Record by year ==
School	Season	Record	(Conf. Record)	Postseason
Fenn College	1932	2-1	(N/A)	--
Fenn College	1933	0–3	(N/A)	--
Fenn College	1934	1–3	(N/A)	--
Fenn College	1935	1–4	(N/A)	--
Fenn College	1936	N/A	(N/A)	--
Fenn College	1937	N/A	(N/A)	--
Fenn College	1938	N/A	(N/A)	--
Fenn College	1939	N/A	(N/A)	--
Fenn College	1940	N/A	(N/A)	--
Fenn College	1941	N/A	(N/A)	--
Fenn College	1942	N/A	(N/A)	--
Fenn College	1943	N/A	(N/A)	--
Fenn College	1944	N/A	(N/A)	--
Fenn College	1945	N/A	(N/A)	--
Fenn College	1946	N/A	(N/A)	--
Fenn College	1947	8-3	(N/A)	--
Fenn College	1948	5–6	(N/A)	--
Fenn College	1949	5-5-1	(N/A)	--
Fenn College	1950	7-7	(N/A)	--
Fenn College	1951	0–7	(N/A)	--
Fenn College	1952	2–5	(N/A)	--
Fenn College	1953	6-2	(N/A)	--
Fenn College	1954	3–7	(N/A)	--
Fenn College	1955	3–5	(N/A)	--
Fenn College	1956	5-5	(N/A)	--
Fenn College	1957	2–8	(N/A)	--
Fenn College	1958	3–11	(N/A)	--
Fenn College	1959	5–10	(N/A)	--
Fenn College	1960	4–6	(N/A)	--
Fenn College	1961	1–10	(N/A)	--
Fenn College	1962	8-4	(N/A)	--
Fenn College	1963	5–9	(N/A)	--
Fenn College	1964	3–9	(N/A)	--
Fenn College	1965	4-8-1	(N/A)	--
Cleveland State	1966	6–8	(N/A)	--
Cleveland State	1967	8-8	(N/A)	--
Cleveland State	1968	9-9	(N/A)	--
Cleveland State	1969	9-9	(N/A)	--
Cleveland State	1970	16-4	(N/A)	--
Cleveland State	1971	17-10	(N/A)	--
Cleveland State	1972	20-14	(N/A)	--
Cleveland State	1973	20-10	(?-?)	NCAA College Division Regionals
Cleveland State	1974	12–20	(?-?)	--
Cleveland State	1975	19-11	(?-?)	--
Cleveland State	1976	12–19	(?-?)	--
Cleveland State	1977	22-13	(?-?)	--
Cleveland State	1978	14-17-1	(?-?)	--
Cleveland State	1979	15–29	(?-?)	--
Cleveland State	1980	24-26-2	(?-?)	--
Cleveland State	1981	24-22-1	(?-?)	--
Cleveland State	1982	28–35	(?-?)	--
Cleveland State	1983	10–32	(?-?)	--
Cleveland State	1984	10-38-1	(N/A)	--
Cleveland State	1985	23-29-3	(4–4)	--
Cleveland State	1986	23–24	(7–4)	--
Cleveland State	1987	20-17-2	(5–5)	--
Cleveland State	1988	16–32	(5–6)	--
Cleveland State	1989	24-21	(7–3)	--
Cleveland State	1990	13–27	(3–6)	--
Cleveland State	1991	22–24	(2–10)	--
Cleveland State	1992	12–34	(5–17)	--
Cleveland State	1993	23–36	(10–10)	--
Cleveland State	1994	15–38	(9–15)	--
Cleveland State	1995	12-42-1	(4–12)	--
Cleveland State	1996	15–37	(4–20)	--
Cleveland State	1997	20–28	(12–12)	--
Cleveland State	1998	21–32	(8–11)	--
Cleveland State	1999	22–34	(12–8)	--
Cleveland State	2000	23–33	(10–9)	--
Cleveland State	2001	23–34	(6–14)	--
Cleveland State	2002	17–35	(11–12)	--
Cleveland State	2003	13–39	(4–18)	--
Cleveland State	2004	19–33	(11–12)	--
Cleveland State	2005	14–36	(5–15)	--
Cleveland State	2006	10–42	(6–22)	--
Cleveland State	2007	14–44	(10–17)	--
Cleveland State	2008	22–31	(10–13)	--
Cleveland State	2009	21–31	(12–13)	--
Cleveland State	2010	12–43	(5–20)	--
Cleveland State	2011	12–43	(5–20)	--
Total	69 years	859-1371-13	(?-?)	1 Postseason bid

== NCAA Championship history ==
Season	Eliminated Round	Teams Defeated	Lost to
1973	Mideast Regional	SIU Edwardsville	Eastern Illinois; Indiana Central

== Head coaching history ==
#	Name	Years	Record
1	Homer E. Woodling	1932—1933	2–4
2	Ted Okonski	1934—1934	1–3
3	Homer E. Woodling	1935—1935	1–4
4	George McKinnon	1947—1949	18-14-1
5	George Rung	1950—1951	7–14
6	Homer E. Woodling	1952—1959	29–53
7	Jim Rodriguez	1960—1971	90-94-1
8	Garry Roggenburk	1972—1978	119-104-1
9	Fernando Arango	1979—1991	252-356-9
10	Kevin Rhomberg	1992—1996	77-187-1
11	Jay Murphy	1997—2006	182–346
12	Kevin Kocks	2007—2011	81–192
