= Youngstown State Penguins baseball =

Youngstown State Penguins
- 2026 Youngstown State Penguins baseball team
- Founded: 1948
- University: Youngstown State University
- Head coach: Trevor Charpie (2nd season)
- Conference: Horizon League
- Location: Youngstown, Ohio
- Home stadium: 7 17 Credit Union Field at Eastwood (Capacity: 6,000)
- Nickname: Penguins
- Colors: Red, white, and black

NCAA tournament appearances
- 2004, 2014; NCAA DII: 1977

Conference tournament champions
- 2004, 2014

Conference regular season champions
- 1995

The Youngstown State Penguins baseball team is a varsity intercollegiate athletic team of Youngstown State University in Youngstown, Ohio, United States. The team is a member of the Horizon League, which is part of the National Collegiate Athletic Association's Division I. The team plays its home games at 7 17 Credit Union Field at Eastwood in Niles, Ohio. The Penguins are coached by Trevor Charpie.

== Youngstown State in the NCAA Tournament ==
Year	Record	Pct	Notes
2004	0–2	.000	Austin Regional
2014	1–2	.333	Bloomington Regional
TOTALS	1–4	.200	

== Head coaches ==
Year(s)	Coach	Seasons	W–L–T	Pct
1948–1985	Dom Rosselli	38	514–287–1	.642
1986–1987	Greg Gulas	2	27–61	.307
1988–1989	Scott Knox / John Zizzo	2	43–45	.489
1990–1991	John Zizzo	2	47–52	.475
1992–1998	Dan Kubacki	7	162–172	.485
1999–2007	Mike Florak	9	209–276–1	.431
2008–2012	Rich Pasquale	5	86–187	.315
2013–2016	Steve Gillispie	4	61–153	.285
2017–2024	Dan Bertolini	8	141–266	.346
2025–present	Trevor Charpie	1	0–0	–
Totals	10	76	1,290–1,499–2	.463

== See also ==
- List of NCAA Division I baseball programs
