= Milwaukee Panthers baseball =

Milwaukee Panthers
- 2026 Milwaukee Panthers baseball team
- Founded: 1957
- Overall record: 1092–1272–4 (.462)
- University: University of Wisconsin–Milwaukee
- Athletic director: Amanda Braun
- Head coach: Shaun Wegner (3rd season)
- Conference: Horizon League
- Location: Franklin, Wisconsin
- Home stadium: Franklin Field (capacity: 4,000)
- Nickname: Panthers
- Colors: Black and gold

NCAA tournament appearances
- 1999, 2001, 2002, 2010, 2026

Conference tournament champions
- 1999, 2001, 2002, 2010, 2026

Conference regular season champions
- 2000, 2001, 2013

The Milwaukee Panthers are an NCAA Division I college baseball team competing in the Horizon League for the University of Wisconsin–Milwaukee. The current head coach is Shaun Wegner. The team plays its home games at Franklin Field in the southern Milwaukee suburb of Franklin, Wisconsin.

The only Division I college baseball team in the state of Wisconsin, the Panthers have qualified for five NCAA tournaments since 1999, including a win over #1 ranked Rice in the first round of the 1999 NCAA tournament and a regional finals appearance in the 2026 NCAA tournament.

== Coaches ==
Coach	Years	Wins	Losses	Ties	Pct.
Armin Kraeft	1956	5	3	1	.611
Bill Ritter	1957–1970	122	161	1	.431
Frank Orzel	1971–1973	27	50	0	.351
Jim Burian	1987–1990	62	115	0	.350
Scott Kugi	1991–1993	33	86	0	.277
Bill Schufrieder	1994	20	30	0	.400
Jerry Augustine	1995–2006	347	297	1	.539
Scott Doffek	2007–2023	438	462	2	.487
Shaun Wegner	2024-present	70	102	0	.407

=== NCAA tournament results ===
The Panthers have appeared in five NCAA tournaments (1999, 2001, 2002, 2010, 2026). Their combined record is 3-10.

Year	Round	Opponent	Result/Score
1999	Lubbock Regional (Game 1); Lubbock Regional (Game 2); Lubbock Regional (Game 3)	Rice; Texas Tech; Rice	W 8–4; L 8–5; L 27–1
2001	South Bend Regional (Game 1); South Bend Regional (Game 2)	Notre Dame; UC Santa Barbara	L 12–4; L 13–12
2002	Lincoln Regional (Game 1); Lincoln Regional (Game 2)	Nebraska; SW Missouri State	L 7–2; L 6–1
2010	Tempe Regional (Game 1); Tempe Regional (Game 2)	Arizona State; San Diego	L 6–2; L 22–1
2026	Auburn Regional (Game 1); Auburn Regional (Game 2); Auburn Regional Final (Game 1); Auburn Regional Final (Game 2)	Auburn; UCF; Auburn; Auburn	W 13–8; W 13–6; L 8–1; L 8–3

== Facilities ==
After playing at a variety of home sites in 1991, the Panthers played at Simmons Field in Kenosha in 1992 and 1993. They then began playing home games at Henry Aaron Field at Lincoln Park in Glendale for the 1994 season. The 2019 Panthers schedule showed home games played at Henry Aaron Field; at Kapco Park on the campus of Concordia University Wisconsin; and one game at Miller Park.

In February 2018, the Panthers reached an agreement to move their home games to Franklin Field in Franklin, Wisconsin. Their first game in Franklin was scheduled for March 20, 2020, though the season was canceled due to the COVID-19 pandemic two weeks prior. Their first home game in Franklin was on March 26, 2021, a 6–3 win over Purdue Fort Wayne.

The Panthers have played 32 games at the Milwaukee Brewers' American Family Field since 2002, posting a record of 21–11 as of 2024. Since 2022, the annual game has been contested against Division III MSOE.

== All-Americans ==
- Mike Goetz, 2006

== Major League Baseball draftees ==
Milwaukee has had 26 Major League Baseball draft selections since the draft began in 1965.

Panthers in the Major League Baseball draft
Year	Player	Round	Pick	Team
1989	Michael Johnson	27	703	Brewers
1993	Craig Scheffler	12	326	Dodgers
1995	Cory Bigler	23	629	Pirates
1998	Lee Jaramillo	31	926	Brewers
2000	Michael Oiler	35	1041	Brewers
2001	Scott Gillitzer	22	670	Dodgers
2006	Mike Goetz	25	752	Brewers
2011	Chad Pierce	38	1151	Brewers
2012	Jordan Guth	9	308	Phillies
2012	Eric Semmelhack	12	395	Brewers
2012	Paul Hoenecke	24	746	Dodgers
2013	Josh Uhen	5	152	Brewers
2015	Justin Langley	16	476	Marlins
2015	Sam Koenig	27	825	Angels
2015	Mitch Ghelfi	28	841	Brewers
2016	Brian Keller	39	1178	Yankees
2017	Daulton Varsho	2	68	Diamondbacks
2017	Adam Ruess	29	861	Athletics
2018	Austin Schulfer	19	574	Twins
2019	Jake Sommers	10	305	Cardinals
2019	Trevor Schwecke	13	387	Blue Jays
2022	AJ Blubaugh	7	223	Astros
2023	Riley Frey	19	579	Braves
2024	Owen Rice	20	591	Cardinals
2026	Dominic Kibler	12	352	Braves
2026	Dylan O'Connell	15	441	Athletics

== See also ==
- List of NCAA Division I baseball programs
