= Wright State Raiders baseball =

College baseball team of Wright State University

- 2026 Wright State Raiders baseball team
- Founded: 1971; 55 years ago
- University: Wright State University
- Head coach: Alex Sogard (8th season)
- Conference: Horizon League
- Location: Dayton, Ohio
- Home stadium: Nischwitz Stadium (capacity: 750)
- Nickname: Raiders
- Colors: Hunter green and vegas gold

College World Series appearances
- 1987 (Division II)

NCAA tournament appearances
- Division II; 1975, 1976, 1977, 1978, 1980, 1983, 1986, 1987 Division I 1994, 1995, 2006, 2009, 2011, 2015, 2016, 2018, 2021, 2022, 2023, 2025

Conference tournament champions
- 1992, 1993, 1994, 1995, 2006, 2009, 2011, 2015, 2016, 2018, 2021, 2022, 2023, 2025

Conference regular season champions
- 1992, 1993, 1994, 1997, 2010, 2011, 2014, 2016, 2018, 2019, 2021, 2022, 2023, 2024, 2025, 2026

The Wright State Raiders baseball team is the college baseball team of Wright State University. The program was founded in 1971 where it started off in Division II until 1988 when it moved to Division I. Nischwitz Stadium in Dayton, Ohio, has been the home field of the program since 1993. The team has won 12 conference regular season championships, 12 conference tournament championships, and has appeared in the NCAA tournament 10 times.

== Stadium ==
Wright State currently plays at Nischwitz Stadium. The 750 seat stadium was built in 1993 and was named after Ron and Gregg Nischwitz. Ron coached the program for 30 years.

== Year-by-year results ==
WSU's records season by season since joining Division I in 1988.

Season	Head coach	Overall record	Conf. record	Postseason
Division I Independent
1988	Ron Nischwitz	32–28	0–0	
1989	Ron Nischwitz	45–12	0–0	
1990	Ron Nischwitz	35–20	0–0	
1991	Ron Nischwitz	39–16	0–0	
Mid-Continent Conference
1992	Ron Nischwitz	40–16	17–3	
1993	Ron Nischwitz	39–15	17–3	
1994	Ron Nischwitz	39–21	16–8	NCAA tournament
Midwestern Collegiate Conference
1995	Ron Nischwitz	33–28	10–6	NCAA Play-In-Series
1996	Ron Nischwitz	20–28	10–12	
1997	Ron Nischwitz	31–28	16–6	
1998	Ron Nischwitz	20–34	9–13	
1999	Ron Nischwitz	26–28	8–10	
2000	Ron Nischwitz	19–39	8–12	
2001	Ron Nischwitz	31–27	12–8	
Horizon League
2002	Ron Nischwitz	20–33	9–14	
2003	Ron Nischwitz	21–34	10–13	
2004	Ron Nischwitz	22–34	10–11	
2005	Rob Cooper	26–34	11–9	
2006	Rob Cooper	32–27	17–13	NCAA tournament
2007	Rob Cooper	36–22	21–9	
2008	Rob Cooper	30–23	16–6	
2009	Rob Cooper	33–30	14–12	NCAA tournament
2010	Rob Cooper	31–25	17–6	
2011	Rob Cooper	36–19	16–7	NCAA tournament
2012	Rob Cooper	37–21	20–10	
2013	Rob Cooper	25–30	9–12	
2014	Greg Lovelady	33–20	25–4	
2015	Greg Lovelady	43–16	21–8	NCAA tournament
2016	Greg Lovelady	46–17	23–6	NCAA tournament
2017	Jeff Mercer	38–21	21–9	
2018	Jeff Mercer	39–15	22–6	NCAA tournament
2019	Alex Sogard	41–15	21–8	
2020	Alex Sogard	6–9*	0–0	*Season Canceled
2021	Alex Sogard	35–13	28–4	NCAA tournament
2022	Alex Sogard	30–27	20–9	NCAA tournament
2023	Alex Sogard	39–21	22–8	NCAA tournament
2024	Alex Sogard	32-24	20-10	
2025	Alex Sogard	40-21	25-5	NCAA tournament

== Wright State in the NCAA tournament ==
Wright State has been in the NCAA tournament 11 times. The team last played in the NCAA tournament in 2025 after they won the Horizon League tournament championship. They were sent to the Nashville Regional where they finished 2-2 and eliminated #1 overall seed Vanderbilt.

- The NCAA Division I baseball tournament started in 1947.
- The format of the tournament has changed through the years.

Year	Record	Pct	Notes
1987	2–2	.500	Division II College World Series
1994	1–2	.333	Mideast Regional
2006	0–2	.000	Corvallis Regional
2009	0–2	.000	Fort Worth Regional
2011	0–2	.000	College Station Regional
2015	2–2	.500	Champaign Regional
2016	2–2	.500	Louisville Regional
2018	0–2	.000	Stanford Regional
2021	0–2	.000	Knoxville Regional
2022	0–2	.000	Blacksburg Regional
2023	0–2	.000	Terre Haute Regional
2025	2–2	.500	Nashville Regional
TOTALS	9–24	.273	( D-I )

== Notable former players ==
- Brian Anderson
- Keith Gordon
- Carlos Peña
- Joe Smith
- Robert Pollard
- Sean Murphy
- Jesse Scholtens
- Peyton Burdick
- Tyler Black (baseball)
