= UIC Flames baseball =

Baseball team of the University of Illinois at Chicago

UIC Flames
- 2026 UIC Flames baseball team
- Founded: 1949
- Conference history: Mid Continent Conference (1984–1994); Horizon League (1995–2022)
- University: University of Illinois at Chicago
- Athletic director: Michael Lipitz
- Head coach: Sean McDermott (5th season)
- Conference: MVC
- Location: Chicago, Illinois
- Home stadium: Les Miller Field at Curtis Granderson Stadium (capacity: 1,000)
- Nickname: Flames
- Colors: Navy blue and fire engine red

NCAA tournament appearances
- 2003, 2005, 2007, 2008, 2017, 2019, 2026

Conference tournament champions
- Summit: 1990, 1993; Horizon: 2003, 2005, 2007, 2008; Missouri Valley: 2026

Conference regular season champions
- Horizon:2000, 2002, 2003, 2004, 2005, 2006, 2007, 2008, 2009, 2011, 2012, 2017; Missouri Valley: 2026

The UIC Flames baseball team is a varsity intercollegiate athletic team of the University of Illinois at Chicago in Chicago, Illinois, United States. The team is a member of the Missouri Valley Conference, which is part of the National Collegiate Athletic Association's Division I. The team plays its home games at Les Miller Field at Curtis Granderson Stadium in Chicago, Illinois. The Flames are coached by Sean McDermott.

== UIC in the NCAA Tournament ==
Year	Record	Pct	Notes
2003	0–2	.000	Palo Alto Regional
2005	0–2	.000	Lincoln Regional
2007	1–2	.333	Long Beach Regional
2008	1–2	.333	College Station Regional
2017	0–2	.000	Hattiesburg Regional
2019	0–2	.000	Louisville Regional
2026	0–2	.000	Atlanta Regional
TOTALS	2–14	.125	

== Conference membership history ==
- 1949–1980: Chicagoland Collegiate Athletic Conference
- 1981–1983: Independent
- 1984–1994: Mid Continent Conference
- 1995–2022: Horizon League
- 2023–present: Missouri Valley Conference

== Les Miller Field at Curtis Granderson Stadium ==
Les Miller Field at Curtis Granderson Stadium is a baseball stadium on the UIC campus in Chicago, Illinois that seats 1,000 spectators and is named for Les Miller, UIC head baseball coach from 1949 to 1979, and Curtis Granderson, an alumnus of the program. During Miller's tenure, the program won over 500 games. Granderson was named conference player of the year with the Flames in 2002 and later played in Major League Baseball.

== Head coaches ==
Year(s)	Coach	Seasons	W–L–T	Pct
1949–1979	Les Miller	31	509–363–5	.583
1980–1982	Dick Ward	3	47–102	.315
1983–1998	Dean Refakes	16	376–467–3	.446
1999–2021	Mike Dee	23	690–522–1	.569
2022–present	Sean McDermott	3	85–70	.548
Totals	5	76	1,707–1,524–8	.528

== Awards and honors ==
- Over their 15 seasons in the Horizon League, 61 different Flames have been named to the all-conference first-team.

=== Horizon League Player of the Year ===
Year	Position	Name
2002	OF	Curtis Granderson
2013	OF	Chuck Peters
2015	SS	Jeff Boehm
2017	C	Rob Calabrese

=== Horizon League Pitcher of the Year ===
Year	Name
1994	Jon Piazza
1997	Jason Henry
2007	Zach Peterson
2009	Adam Worthington
2015	Jake Dahlberg
2017	Jake Dahlberg
2018	Ryan Campbell
2019	Jacob Key

=== Horizon League Relief Pitcher of the Year ===
Year	Name
2007	David Cales
2008	Adam Worthington
2016	Trevor Lane
2017	Alex Padilla
2018	Charlie Cerny
2019	Alex Padilla

=== Horizon League Coach of the Year ===
Year	Name
1990	Dean Refakes
1993	Dean Refakes
1999	Mike Dee
2000	Mike Dee
2002	Mike Dee
2003	Mike Dee
2005	Mike Dee
2006	Mike Dee
2007	Mike Dee
2008	Mike Dee
2015	Mike Dee
2017	Mike Dee

== See also ==
- List of NCAA Division I baseball programs
