= List of college athletic programs in Illinois =

This is a list of college athletic programs in the U.S. state of Illinois.

== NCAA ==
=== Division I ===
Full NCAA Division I member colleges in Illinois.
– FBS Football, – FCS Football, – Non-football

Team	School	City	Conference	Sport sponsorship						
Team	School	City	Conference	Football	Basketball		Baseball	Softball	Soccer	
Team	School	City	Conference	Football	M	W	Baseball	Softball	M	W
Bradley Braves	Bradley University	Peoria	Missouri Valley	No	Yes	Yes	Yes	Yes	Yes	No
Chicago State Cougars	Chicago State University	Chicago	Northeast	FCS (Note: Chicago State’s football team competes as an independent.)	Yes	Yes	No	No	Yes	Yes
DePaul Blue Demons	DePaul University	Chicago	Big East	No	Yes	Yes	No	Yes	Yes	Yes
Eastern Illinois Panthers	Eastern Illinois University	Charleston	Ohio Valley	FCS	Yes	Yes	Yes	Yes	Yes	Yes
Illinois Fighting Illini	University of Illinois Urbana-Champaign	Urbana, Champaign (Note: The University of Illinois' campus is divided almost evenly between the twin cities of Urbana and Champaign.)	Big Ten	FBS	Yes	Yes	Yes	Yes	No	Yes
UIC Flames (Note: Although "UIC" is the school's preferred athletic name, national sports media generally use "Illinois–Chicago" in score listings and on first reference.)	University of Illinois Chicago	Chicago	Missouri Valley	No	Yes	Yes	Yes	Yes	Yes	Yes
Illinois State Redbirds	Illinois State University	Normal	Missouri Valley	FCS (Note: Illinois State, Southern Illinois, and Western Illinois's football teams compete in the Missouri Valley Football Conference.)	Yes	Yes	Yes	Yes	No	Yes
Loyola Ramblers	Loyola University Chicago	Chicago	Atlantic 10	No	Yes	Yes	No	Yes	Yes	Yes
Northern Illinois Huskies	Northern Illinois University	DeKalb	Horizon	FBS (Note: Northern Illinois’s football team competes in the Mountain West Conference.)	Yes	Yes	Yes	Yes	Yes	Yes
Northwestern Wildcats	Northwestern University	Evanston	Big Ten	FBS	Yes	Yes	Yes	Yes	Yes	Yes
Southern Illinois Salukis	Southern Illinois University Carbondale	Carbondale	Missouri Valley	FCS	Yes	Yes	Yes	Yes	No	Yes
SIUE Cougars (Note: Although "SIUE" is the school's preferred athletic name, national sports media generally use "Southern Illinois–Edwardsville" or "SIU–Edwardsville".)	Southern Illinois University Edwardsville	Edwardsville	Ohio Valley	No	Yes	Yes	Yes	Yes	Yes	Yes
Western Illinois Leathernecks	Western Illinois University	Macomb	Ohio Valley	FCS	Yes	Yes	Yes	Yes	Yes	Yes

=== Division II ===
Full NCAA Division II member colleges in Illinois.
– Football member, – Non-football member

Team	School	City	Conference	Sport sponsorship						
Team	School	City	Conference	Football	Basketball		Baseball	Softball	Soccer	
Team	School	City	Conference	Football	M	W	Baseball	Softball	M	W
UIS Prairie Stars (Note: The national sports media usually refer to UIS as "Illinois–Springfield".)	University of Illinois at Springfield	Springfield	Great Lakes Valley	No	Yes	Yes	Yes	Yes	Yes	Yes
Lewis Flyers	Lewis University	Romeoville	Great Lakes Valley	No	Yes	Yes	Yes	Yes	Yes	Yes
McKendree Bearcats	McKendree University	Lebanon	Great Lakes Valley	Yes	Yes	Yes	Yes	Yes	Yes	Yes
Quincy Hawks	Quincy University	Quincy	Great Lakes Valley	Yes (Note: Quincy additionally fields a team in sprint football, a weight-restricted form of football not governed by the NCAA, and is a charter member of the Midwest Sprint Football League.)	Yes	Yes	Yes	Yes	Yes	Yes
Roosevelt Lakers	Roosevelt University	Chicago	Great Lakes Valley	Yes	Yes	Yes	Yes	Yes	Yes	Yes

=== Division III ===
Team	School	City	Conference	Sport sponsorship								
Team	School	City	Conference	Football	Basketball		Baseball	Softball	Ice hockey		Soccer	
Team	School	City	Conference	Football	M	W	Baseball	Softball	M	W	M	W
Augustana Vikings	Augustana College	Rock Island	CCIW	Yes	Yes	Yes	Yes	Yes	No	No	Yes	Yes
Aurora Spartans	Aurora University	Aurora	Northern	Yes	Yes	Yes	Yes	Yes	Yes (Note: Aurora and Lake Forest's ice hockey teams all compete in the Northern Collegiate Hockey Association.)	Yes	Yes	Yes
Benedictine Eagles	Benedictine University	Lisle	Northern	Yes	Yes	Yes	Yes	Yes	No	No	Yes	Yes
Blackburn Beavers	Blackburn College	Carlinville	St. Louis	No	Yes	Yes	Yes	Yes	No	No	Yes	Yes
Chicago Maroons	University of Chicago	Chicago	UAA	Yes (Note: Chicago's football and baseball teams compete in the Midwest Conference.)	Yes	Yes	Yes	Yes (Note: Chicago's softball team competes as an independent.)	No	No	Yes	Yes
Concordia Cougars	Concordia University Chicago	River Forest	Northern	Yes	Yes	Yes	Yes	Yes	No	No	Yes	Yes
Dominican Stars	Dominican University	River Forest	Northern	No	Yes	Yes	Yes	Yes	No	No	Yes	Yes
Elmhurst Bluejays	Elmhurst University	Elmhurst	CCIW	Yes	Yes	Yes	Yes	Yes	No	No	Yes	Yes
Eureka Red Devils	Eureka College	Eureka	St. Louis	Yes (Note: Eureka's football team competes in the Northern Athletics Collegiate Conference.)	Yes	Yes	Yes	Yes	No	No	Yes	Yes
Greenville Panthers	Greenville University	Greenville	St. Louis	Yes (Note: Greenville's football team competes in the Upper Midwest Athletic Conference.)	Yes	Yes	Yes	Yes	No	No	Yes	Yes
Illinois College Blueboys and Lady Blues	Illinois College	Jacksonville	Midwest	Yes	Yes	Yes	Yes	Yes	No	No	Yes	Yes
Illinois Tech Scarlet Hawks	Illinois Institute of Technology	Chicago	Northern	No	Yes	Yes	Yes	No	No	No	Yes	Yes
Illinois Wesleyan Titans	Illinois Wesleyan University	Bloomington	CCIW	Yes	Yes	Yes	Yes	Yes	No	No	Yes	Yes
Knox Prairie Fire	Knox College	Galesburg	Midwest	Yes	Yes	Yes	Yes	Yes	No	No	Yes	Yes
Lake Forest Foresters	Lake Forest College	Lake Forest	Midwest	Yes	Yes	Yes	No	Yes	Yes	Yes	Yes	Yes
Millikin Big Blue	Millikin University	Decatur	CCIW	Yes	Yes	Yes	Yes	Yes	No	No	Yes	Yes
Monmouth Fighting Scots	Monmouth College	Monmouth	Midwest	Yes	Yes	Yes	Yes	Yes	No	No	Yes	Yes
North Central Cardinals	North Central College	Naperville	CCIW	Yes	Yes	Yes	Yes	Yes	No	No	Yes	Yes
North Park Vikings	North Park University	Chicago	CCIW	Yes	Yes	Yes	Yes	Yes	No	No	Yes	Yes
Principia Panthers	Principia College	Elsah	St. Louis	No	Yes	Yes	Yes	Yes	No	No	Yes	Yes
Rockford Regents	Rockford University	Rockford	Northern	Yes	Yes	Yes	Yes	Yes	No	No	Yes	Yes
Wheaton Thunder	Wheaton College	Wheaton	CCIW	Yes	Yes	Yes	Yes	Yes	No	No	Yes	Yes

== NAIA ==
Team	School	City	Conference	Sport sponsorship						
Team	School	City	Conference	Football	Basketball		Baseball	Softball	Soccer	
Team	School	City	Conference	Football	M	W	Baseball	Softball	M	W
Governors State Jaguars	Governors State University	University Park	Chicagoland	No	Yes	Yes	No	No	Yes	Yes
Judson Eagles	Judson University	Elgin	Chicagoland	Yes (Note: The football teams of Judson, Olivet Nazarene, St. Francis, and Saint Xavier all compete in the Mid-States Football Association.)	Yes	Yes	Yes	Yes	Yes	Yes
Olivet Nazarene Tigers	Olivet Nazarene University	Bourbonnais	Chicagoland	Yes	Yes	Yes	Yes	Yes	Yes	Yes
St. Francis Fighting Saints	University of St. Francis	Joliet	Chicagoland	Yes	Yes	Yes	Yes	Yes	Yes	Yes
Saint Xavier Cougars	Saint Xavier University	Chicago	Chicagoland	Yes	Yes	Yes	Yes	Yes	Yes	Yes

== NJCAA ==
Team	School	City	Conference
Black Hawk East Warriors	Black Hawk College	Kewanee	Arrowhead
Black Hawk Quad Cities Braves	Black Hawk College	Moline	Arrowhead
Carl Sandburg Chargers	Carl Sandburg College	Galesburg	Arrowhead
Danville Area Jaguars	Danville Area Community College	Danville	Mid-West Athletic
DuPage Chaparrals	College of DuPage	Glen Ellyn	Illinois N4C
Elgin Spartans	Elgin Community College	Elgin	Illinois Skyway
Harper Hawks	Harper College	Palatine	Illinois N4C
Harry S Truman Falcons	Harry S Truman College	Chicago	Illinois N4C
Heartland Hawks	Heartland Community College	Normal	Mid-West Athletic
Highland Cougars	Highland Community College	Freeport	Arrowhead
Illinois Central Cougars	Illinois Central College	East Peoria	Mid-West Athletic
Illinois Valley Eagles	Illinois Valley Community College	Oglesby	Arrowhead
John A. Logan Volunteers	John A. Logan College	Carterville	Great Rivers
John Wood Trail Blazers	John Wood Community College	Quincy	Mid-West Athletic
Joliet Junior College Wolves	Joliet Junior College	Joliet	Illinois N4C
Kankakee Cavaliers	Kankakee Community College	Kankakee	Arrowhead
Kaskaskia Blue Devils/Blue Angels	Kaskaskia College	Centralia	Great Rivers
Kennedy-King Statesmen	Kennedy-King College	Chicago	Illinois N4C
Kishwaukee Kougars	Kishwaukee College	Malta	Arrowhead
Lake County Lancers	College of Lake County	Grayslake	Illinois Skyway
Lake Land Lakers	Lake Land College	Mattoon	Great Rivers
Lewis & Clark Trailblazers	Lewis & Clark Community College	Godfrey	Mid-West Athletic
Lincoln Land Loggers	Lincoln Land Community College	Springfield	Mid-West Athletic
Lincoln Trail Statesmen	Lincoln Trail College	Robinson	Great Rivers
Malcolm X Hawks	Malcolm X College	Chicago	Illinois N4C
McHenry County Fighting Scots	McHenry County College	Crystal Lake	Illinois Skyway
Moraine Valley Cyclones	Moraine Valley Community College	Palos Hills	Illinois Skyway
Morton Panthers	Morton College	Cicero	Illinois Skyway
Oakton Raiders	Oakton College	Des Plaines	Illinois Skyway
Olive-Harvey Panthers	Olive-Harvey College	Chicago	Illinois N4C
Olney Central Blue Knights	Olney Central College	Olney	Great Rivers
Parkland Cobras	Parkland College	Champaign	Mid-West Athletic
Prairie State Pioneers	Prairie State College	Chicago Heights	Illinois Skyway
Rend Lake Warriors	Rend Lake College	Ina	Great Rivers
Richard J. Daley Bulldogs	Richard J. Daley College	Chicago	Illinois N4C
Rock Valley Golden Eagles	Rock Valley College	Rockford	Illinois N4C
Sauk Valley Skyhawks	Sauk Valley Community College	Dixon	Arrowhead
Shawnee Saints	Shawnee Community College	Ullin	Great Rivers
South Suburban Bulldogs	South Suburban College	South Holland	Illinois N4C
Southeastern Illinois Falcons	Southeastern Illinois College	Harrisburg	Great Rivers
Southwestern Illinois Blue Storm	Southwestern Illinois College	Belleville	Great Rivers
Spoon River Snappers	Spoon River College	Canton	Mid-West Athletic
Triton Trojans	Triton College	River Grove	Illinois N4C
Wabash Valley Warriors	Wabash Valley College	Mt. Carmel	Great Rivers
Waubonsee Chiefs	Waubonsee Community College	Sugar Grove	Illinois Skyway
Wilbur Wright Rams	Wilbur Wright College	Chicago	Illinois N4C

== NCCAA ==
Team	School	City	Conference
Judson Eagles	Judson University	Elgin	Chicagoland
Moody Bible Archers	Moody Bible Institute	Chicago	Independent

== USCAA ==
Team	School	City	Conference
East–West Phantoms	East–West University	Chicago	Independent

== Other/None ==
Team	School	City	Conference
Dayspring Bible Eagles	Dayspring Bible College	Mundelein	Independent

== See also ==
- List of NCAA Division I institutions
- List of NCAA Division II institutions
- List of NCAA Division III institutions
- List of NAIA institutions
- List of USCAA institutions
- List of NCCAA institutions
- List of NJCAA Division I institutions
- List of NJCAA Division II institutions
- List of NJCAA Division III institutions
