= List of NJCAA Division II schools =

There are 157 Division II teams in the National Junior College Athletic Association (NJCAA) that play in 24 different regions. They make it the second largest division in the NJCAA by school count.

These schools are limited to awarding tuition, fees, course-related books, and up to $250 in course required supplies.

== Members ==
=== Alabama ===
- Reid State Community College Lions in Evergreen

=== Arkansas ===
- North Arkansas College Pioneers in Harrison
- Arkansas State University-Newport Aviators in Newport
- Arkansas State University Mid-South Greyhounds in West Memphis
- Arkansas State University Three Rivers Eagles in Malvern
- Phillips Community College of the University of Arkansas Ridge Runners in Helena-West Helena
- Southeast Arkansas College Sharks in Pine Bluff

=== Arizona ===
- Chandler-Gilbert Community College Coyotes in Chandler
- Glendale Community College (Arizona) Gauchos in Glendale
- Phoenix College Bears in Phoenix
- Pima Community College Aztecs in Tucson
- Scottsdale Community College Artichokes in Scottsdale
- South Mountain Community College Cougars in Phoenix
- Mesa Community College Thunderbirds in Mesa

=== Delaware ===
- Delaware Technical Community College-Stanton-Wilmington Campus Spirit in Stanton
- Delaware Technical Community College-Terry Campus Hawks in Dover
- Delaware Technical Community College-Owens Campus Roadrunners in Georgetown

=== Florida ===
- Florida Gateway College Timberwolves in Lake City
- Pasco–Hernando State College Conquistadors in New Port Richey

=== Illinois ===
- Black Hawk College-Moline Braves in Moline
- Carl Sandburg College Chargers in Galesburg
- College of Lake County Lancers in Grayslake
- Danville Area Community College Jaguars in Danville
- Elgin Community College Spartans in Elgin
- Heartland Community College Hawks in Normal
- Illinois Central College Cougars in East Peoria
- Illinois Valley Community College Eagles in Oglesby
- John Wood Community College Trail Blazers in Quincy
- Kishwaukee College Kougars in Malta
- Lewis & Clark Community College Trailblazers in Godfrey
- Lincoln Land Community College Loggers in Springfield
- McHenry County College Scots in Crystal Lake
- Moraine Valley Community College Cyclones in Palos Hills
- Morton College Panthers in Cicero
- Oakton Community College Raiders in Des Plaines
- Olive-Harvey College Panthers in Chicago
- Parkland College Cobras in Champaign
- Prairie State College Pioneers in Chicago Heights
- Rend Lake College Warriors in Ina
- Sauk Valley Community College Skyhawks in Dixon
- South Suburban College Bulldogs in South Holland
- Spoon River College Mudcats in Canton
- Triton College Trojans in River Grove
- Waubonsee Community College Chiefs in Sugar Grove
- Wilbur Wright College Rams in Chicago

=== Indiana ===
- Marian University Ancilla Chargers in Donaldson

=== Iowa ===
- Clinton Community College (Iowa) Cougars in Clinton
- Des Moines Area Community College Bears in Boone
- Ellsworth Community College Panthers in Iowa Falls
- Iowa Central Community College Tritons in Fort Dodge
- Kirkwood Community College Eagles in Cedar Rapids
- North Iowa Area Community College Trojans in Mason City
- Northwest Iowa Community College Thunder in Sheldon
- Southwestern Community College Spartans in Creston
- Western Iowa Tech Community College Comets in Sioux City

=== Kansas ===
- Brown Mackie College Lions in Salina
- Highland Community College Scotties in Highland (https://www.highlandcc.edu/)
- Johnson County Community College Cavaliers in Overland Park
- Fort Scott Community College Greyhounds in Fort Scott

=== Louisiana ===
- Louisiana State University at Eunice Bengals in Eunice

=== Maryland ===
- Baltimore City Community College Panthers in Baltimore
- CCBC-Catonsville Cardinals in Catonsville
- CCBC-Dundalk Lions in Dundalk
- CCBC-Essex Knights in Essex
- Cecil College Seahawks in North East
- College of Southern Maryland Hawks in La Plata
- Frederick Community College Cougars in Frederick (https://www.frederick.edu/)
- Howard Community College Dragons in Columbia
- Prince George's Community College Owls in Largo

=== Massachusetts ===
- Massasoit Community College Warriors in Brockton

=== Michigan ===
- Alpena Community College Lumberjacks in Alpena
- Bay de Noc Community College Norse in Escanaba
- Delta College (Michigan) Pioneers in University Center
- Detroit Community Christian College Lions in Detroit
- Glen Oaks Community College Vikings in Centreville
- Gogebic Community College Samsons in Ironwood
- Grand Rapids Community College Raiders in Grand Rapids
- Henry Ford College Hawks in Dearborn
- Jackson College Jets in Jackson
- Kellogg Community College Bruins in Battle Creek
- Kirtland Community College Firebirds in Roscommon
- Lake Michigan College Indians in Benton Harbor
- Lansing Community College Stars in Lansing
- Macomb Community College Monarchs in Warren
- Montcalm Community College Centurions in Sidney
- Mott Community College Bears in Flint
- Muskegon Community College Jayhawks in Muskegon
- North Central Michigan College Timberwolves in Petoskey
- Oakland Community College Raiders in Bloomfield Hills
- Schoolcraft College Ocelots in Garden City
- St. Clair County Community College Skippers in Port Huron
- Wayne County Community College Wildcats in Detroit

=== Minnesota ===
- Dakota County Technical College Blue Knights in Rosemount

=== Missouri ===
- Cottey College Comets in Nevada
- Metropolitan Community College-Longview Lakers in Lee's Summit
- Metropolitan Community College-Penn Valley Scouts in Kansas City
- North Central Missouri College Pirates in Trenton
- St. Louis Community College Archers in Florissant Valley (men's soccer), Forest Park (men's/women's basketball), Meramec (baseball, softball, women's soccer and volleyball)

=== Nebraska ===
- Central Community College at Columbus Raiders in Columbus
- Southeast Community College Bobcats in Lincoln

=== New Jersey ===
- Burlington County College Barons in Pemberton
- County College of Morris Titans in Randolph
- Essex County College Wolverines in Newark
- Mercer County Community College Vikings in Trenton
- Salem Community College Oaks in Carneys Point

=== New York ===
- Erie Community College Kats in Buffalo
- Genesee Community College Cougars in Batavia
- Hudson Valley Community College Vikings in Troy
- Jamestown Community College Jayhawks in Jamestown
- Jamestown Community College-Cattaraugus Jaguars in Olean
- Monroe Community College Tribunes in Rochester
- SUNY Niagara Thunderwolves in Sanborn
- Orange County Community College Colts in Middletown
- Sullivan County Community College Generals in Loch Sheldrake

=== North Carolina ===
- Guilford Technical Community College Titans in Jamestown
- Fayetteville Technical Community College Trojans in Fayetteville
- Forsyth Technical Community College Trailblazers in Winston-Salem
- Mayland Community College Mountain Lions in Spruce Pine
- Robeson Community College Diamond Eagles in Lumberton
- Vance-Granville Community College Vanguards in Henderson

=== North Dakota ===
- Dakota College at Bottineau Lumberjacks in Bottineau
- Lake Region State College Royals in Devils Lake
- United Tribes Technical College Thunderbirds in Bismarck

=== Ohio ===
- Bryant & Stratton College Bobcats in Solon
- Cincinnati State Technical & Community College Surge in Cincinnati
- Clark State Community College Eagles in Springfield
- Columbus State Community College Cougars in Columbus
- Cuyahoga Community College Triceratops in Parma
- Edison Community College Chargers in Piqua
- Lakeland Community College Lakers in Kirtland
- Sinclair Community College Tartan Pride in Dayton
- Hocking College Hawks in Logan

=== Oklahoma ===
- Carl Albert State College Vikings in Poteau
- Murray State College Aggies in Tishomingo
- Northern Oklahoma College Jets in Enid
- Northern Oklahoma College Mavericks in Tonkawa

=== Pennsylvania ===
- Community College of Beaver County Titans in Monaca
- Harcum College Bears in Bryn Mawr
- Lackawanna College Falcons in Scranton

=== Rhode Island ===
- Community College of Rhode Island Knights in Warwick

=== Texas ===
- Coastal Bend College Cougars in Beeville

=== Virginia ===
- Patrick & Henry Community College Patriots in Martinsville
- Danville Community College Knights in Danville
- Northern Virginia Community College Nighthawks in Annandale
- Bryant and Stratton College Bobcats in Virginia Beach

=== Wisconsin ===
- Blackhawk Technical College Talons in Janesville
- Bryant & Stratton College Bobcats in Milwaukee

== Note ==
The schools listed above may not compete in Division II in all sports. For instance, Highland (Kan.) and Johnson County field teams in Division II in most sports but their baseball teams compete in Division I. Other schools in Kansas may compete in Division I in some sports but in Division II in others. Many compete in Division II in softball and volleyball while competing in Division I in basketball. In the case of Arkansas State University-Newport, they compete in only men's basketball and women's softball.

== See also ==
- List of NJCAA Division I schools
- List of NJCAA Division III schools
- List of junior college football programs in the United States
- List of USCAA institutions
- List of NCCAA institutions
- List of NAIA institutions
- List of NCAA Division I institutions
- List of NCAA Division II institutions
- List of NCAA Division III institutions
