= List of college athletic conferences in the United States =

In college athletics in the United States, institutions typically join in conferences for regular play under different governing bodies.

== Varsity sports ==
There are several national and regional associations governing the varsity teams of colleges and universities. Varsity teams are typically funded by an institution's athletic department, and under some governing bodies players are eligible for athletic scholarships.

=== National Collegiate Athletic Association (NCAA) ===
==== Division I ====
Multi-sport conferences

- America East Conference
- American Conference
- Atlantic 10 Conference
- Atlantic Coast Conference
- Atlantic Sun Conference
- Big 12 Conference
- Big East Conference
  - Not to be confused with the original Big East. For more details, see 2010–2013 Big East Conference realignment.
- Big Sky Conference
- Big South Conference
- Big Ten Conference
- Big West Conference
- Coastal Athletic Association
- Conference USA
- FBS Independents (applies only to football)
- FCS Independents (applies only to football)
- Horizon League
- Independents (in sports other than football)
  - No all-sports independents in 2026–27, with the most recent such school, Chicago State, having joined the NEC in 2024.
- Ivy League
- Metro Conference – formerly the Metro Atlantic Athletic Conference
- Mid-American Conference
- Mid-Eastern Athletic Conference
- Missouri Valley Conference
- Mountain Pacific Sports Federation – does not sponsor football or basketball
- Mountain West Conference
- NEC – historically the Northeast Conference
- Ohio Valley Conference
- Pac-12 Conference
- Patriot League
- Southeastern Conference
- Southern Conference
- Southland Conference
- Southwestern Athletic Conference
- Summit League
- Sun Belt Conference
- United Athletic Conference – formerly the Western Athletic Conference
- West Coast Conference

Football-only conferences

- CAA Football – Legally a separate entity from the all-sports Coastal Athletic Association, but both leagues have the same administration.
- Missouri Valley Football Conference
- OVC–Big South Football Association – Technically a football-only alliance between the all-sports Big South and Ohio Valley Conferences.
- Pioneer Football League

Ice hockey conferences

- Atlantic Hockey America
- Central Collegiate Hockey Association (men) – previously operated from 1971 to 2013; revived in 2021
- ECAC Hockey
- Hockey East
- Independents (only men in 2025–26)
- National Collegiate Hockey Conference (men)
- New England Women's Hockey Alliance
- Western Collegiate Hockey Association (women)

Other single-sport conferences

This list also includes conferences in sports that the NCAA does not split into divisions.

- Central Collegiate Fencing Conference
- Central Collegiate Ski Association – includes one junior-college team alongside NCAA-sanctioned teams
- Collegiate Water Polo Association
- Eastern Intercollegiate Gymnastics League (men)
- Eastern Intercollegiate Ski Association
- Eastern Intercollegiate Volleyball Association (men)
- Eastern Intercollegiate Wrestling Association
- Eastern Women's Fencing Conference
- Golden Coast Conference (women's water polo)
- Great America Rifle Conference
- Gymnastics East Conference
- Intercollegiate Fencing Conference of Southern California
- Metropolitan Swimming Conference
- Mid-Atlantic Collegiate Fencing Conference
- Mid-Atlantic Rifle Conference – includes a mix of NCAA-sanctioned teams and club teams
- Mid-Atlantic Water Polo Conference
- Midwest Fencing Conference
- Midwest Independent Conference (women's gymnastics)
- Midwestern Intercollegiate Volleyball Association (men)
- National Intercollegiate Women's Fencing Association
- Northeast Fencing Conference
- Patriot Rifle Conference
- Rocky Mountain Intercollegiate Ski Association
- Western Water Polo Association

==== Division II ====
- California Collegiate Athletic Association
- Conference Carolinas
- Central Atlantic Collegiate Conference
- Central Intercollegiate Athletic Association
- East Coast Conference
- Great American Conference
- Great Lakes Intercollegiate Athletic Conference
- Great Lakes Valley Conference
- Great Midwest Athletic Conference
- Great Northwest Athletic Conference
- Gulf South Conference
- Independents
- Lone Star Conference
- Mid-America Intercollegiate Athletics Association
- Mountain East Conference
- Northeast-10 Conference
- Northern Sun Intercollegiate Conference
- Pacific West Conference
- Peach Belt Conference
- Pennsylvania State Athletic Conference
- Rocky Mountain Athletic Conference
- South Atlantic Conference
- Southern Intercollegiate Athletic Conference
- Sunshine State Conference

Single-sport conferences

- Appalachian Swimming Conference
- New South Intercollegiate Swim Conference
- Pacific Coast Swim Conference

==== Division III ====
- Allegheny Mountain Collegiate Conference
- American Rivers Conference
- American Southwest Conference
- Atlantic East Conference
- Centennial Conference
- City University of New York Athletic Conference
- Coast to Coast Athletic Conference
- College Conference of Illinois and Wisconsin
- Collegiate Conference of the South
- Conference of New England
- Empire 8
- Great Northeast Athletic Conference
- Heartland Collegiate Athletic Conference
- Independents
- Landmark Conference
- Liberty League
- Little East Conference
- Massachusetts State Collegiate Athletic Conference
- Michigan Intercollegiate Athletic Association
- Middle Atlantic Conferences – an umbrella organization that operates three conferences.
  - The following conferences sponsor the same set of 14 sports, including both men's and women's basketball, but not football:
    - MAC Commonwealth
    - MAC Freedom
  - The third league, the Middle Atlantic Conference (note the singular), combines schools from the Commonwealth and Freedom conferences in a total of 13 sports, including football.
- Midwest Conference
- Minnesota Intercollegiate Athletic Conference
- New England Small College Athletic Conference
- New England Women's and Men's Athletic Conference
- New Jersey Athletic Conference
- North Atlantic Conference
- North Coast Athletic Conference
- Northern Athletics Collegiate Conference
- Northwest Conference
- Ohio Athletic Conference
- Old Dominion Athletic Conference
- Presidents' Athletic Conference
- St. Louis Intercollegiate Athletic Conference
- Skyline Conference
- Southern Athletic Association
- Southern California Intercollegiate Athletic Conference
- Southern Collegiate Athletic Conference
- State University of New York Athletic Conference
- United East Conference
- University Athletic Association
- Upper Midwest Athletic Conference
- USA South Athletic Conference
- Wisconsin Intercollegiate Athletic Conference

Single-sport conferences

- Coastal Lacrosse Conference (men)
- Continental Volleyball Conference (men)
- Eastern Collegiate Football Conference
- Midwest Collegiate Volleyball League (men)
- Midwest Lacrosse Conference (men)
- Midwest Women's Lacrosse Conference
- New England Collegiate Conference (men's volleyball; also operates in the non-NCAA esports)
- United Collegiate Hockey Conference
- United Volleyball Conference (men)

=== National Association of Intercollegiate Athletics (NAIA) ===
- American Midwest Conference
- Appalachian Athletic Conference
- California Pacific Conference
- Cascade Collegiate Conference
- Chicagoland Collegiate Athletic Conference
- Continental Athletic Conference
- Crossroads League
- Frontier Conference
- Great Plains Athletic Conference
- Great Southwest Athletic Conference
- HBCU Athletic Conference
- Heart of America Athletic Conference
- Football Independents
- Kansas Collegiate Athletic Conference
- Mid-South Conference
- Red River Athletic Conference
- River States Conference
- Sooner Athletic Conference
- Southern States Athletic Conference
- Sun Conference
- Wolverine–Hoosier Athletic Conference

Football-only conference

- Mid-States Football Association

=== United States Collegiate Athletic Association (USCAA) ===
- Eastern States Athletic Conference
- North American Conference for Intercollegiate Athletics
- Penn State University Athletic Conference
- Yankee Small College Conference

=== National Junior College Athletic Association (NJCAA) ===
- Alabama Community College Conference
- Arizona Community College Athletic Conference
- Arrowhead Conference
- Bi-State Conference
- Carolinas Junior College Conference
- Colorado Community College Athletic Conference
- Eastern Pennsylvania Athletic Conference
- Garden State Athletic Conference
- Georgia Junior College Athletic Association
- Great Rivers Athletic Conference
- Illinois Skyway Conference
- Iowa Community College Athletic Conference
- Kansas Jayhawk Community College Conference
- Maryland Junior College Athletic Conference
- Massachusetts Community College Athletic Association
- Michigan Community College Athletic Association
- Mid-Florida Conference
- Mid Hudson Conference
- Mid-State Athletic Conference
- Mid-West Athletic Conference
- Missouri Community College Athletic Conference
- Midwest Football Conference (NJCAA)
- Minnesota College Athletic Conference
- Mississippi Association of Community & Junior Colleges
- MISS-LOU Junior College Conference
- Metro Athletic Conference
- Mon-Dak Conference
- Mountain Valley Conference (NJCAA)
- NJCAA Region 9
- Nebraska Community College Athletic Conference
- North Central Community College Conference
- North Texas Junior College Athletic Conference
- Northeast Football Conference
- Ohio Community College Athletic Conference
- Panhandle Conference
- Pennsylvania Collegiate Athletic Association (Defunct)
- Scenic West Athletic Conference
- Southern Conference
- Southwest Junior College Conference
- Southwest Junior College Football Conference
- Suncoast Conference
- Tennessee Community College Athletic Association
- Western Junior College Athletic Conference
- Western New York Athletic Conference
- Western Pennsylvania Athletic Conference
- Western States Football League
- Wyoming Community College Athletic Conference

=== California Community College Athletic Association (3C2A) ===
- Bay Valley Conference
- Big 8 Conference
- Central Valley Conference
- Coast Conference
- Golden Valley Conference
- Inland Empire Athletic Conference
- Orange Empire Conference
- Pacific Coast Athletic Conference
- South Coast Conference
- Western State Conference

=== Independent conferences ===
- Independent Junior College Athletic Association
- Midwest Christian College Conference
- Northern Intercollegiate Athletic Conference (basketball only)
- Pacific Christian Athletic Conference
- Wisconsin Collegiate Conference
- Ohio Regional Campus Conference
- New South Athletic Conference
- South Western States Intercollegiate Conference

== Other collegiate sports associations ==
=== Boxing ===
- National Collegiate Boxing Association (NCBA)
- United States Intercollegiate Boxing Association (USIBA)

=== Cycling ===
- ACCC: Atlantic Collegiate Cycling Conference
- RMCCC: Rocky Mountain Collegiate Cycling Conference
- ECCC: Eastern Collegiate Cycling Conference
- SCCCC: South Central Collegiate Cycling Conference
- MWCCC: Midwestern Collegiate Cycling Conference
- SECCC: Southeastern Collegiate Cycling Conference
- NCCCC: North Central Collegiate Cycling Conference
- SWCCC: Southwestern Collegiate Cycling Conference
- NWCCC: Northwestern Collegiate Cycling Conference
- WCCC: Western Collegiate Cycling Conference

=== Fencing ===
- Baltimore-Washington Collegiate Fencing Conference (BWCFC)
- Northern California Intercollegiate Fencing League (NCIFL)
- Southern Atlantic Conference (SAC)
- Southwestern Intercollegiate Fencing Association (SWIFA)

=== Gymnastics ===
- East Atlantic Gymnastics League (EAGL) (women)
- Eastern Intercollegiate Gymnastics League (EIGL) (men)

=== Lacrosse ===
See: Category:College lacrosse leagues in the United States

=== Rowing ===
- Eastern Association of Rowing Colleges (EARC) (men)
- Eastern Association of Women's Rowing Colleges (EAWRC)
- Intercollegiate Rowing Association (IRA) (men)
- Southern Intercollegiate Rowing Association (SIRA) (men)

=== Sprint football ===
- Collegiate Sprint Football League (CSFL)
- Midwest Sprint Football League (MSFL)

=== Volleyball ===
- Midwest Intercollegiate Volleyball Association

=== Water polo ===
- Western Water Polo Association

=== Wrestling ===
- National Collegiate Wrestling Association
  - Mid-Atlantic – Teams from Tennessee, the Carolinas, Virginia, Maryland, and Delaware
  - North Central – Teams from Ohio, Michigan, Indiana, Illinois, and Wisconsin
  - Northeast – Teams from New York, Pennsylvania, New Hampshire, Connecticut, Massachusetts, Rhode Island, and Vermont
  - Northwest – Teams from Washington and British Columbia
  - Southeast – Teams from Florida, Alabama, Georgia and Mississippi
  - Southwest – Teams from Texas, Colorado, New Mexico, Louisiana, and Kansas
  - West – Teams from California, Nevada, Utah and Arizona

== List of oldest college sports conferences ==
The following table is a sortable listing of the oldest college sports conferences (organizations of athletic teams at the collegiate level) in the United States of America. This includes U.S. collegiate sports organizations of NCAA Divisions I, II, and III; as well as various sports including Rowing, Cricket, Basketball, Hockey, Wrestling, Football, Basketball, Track, and more.

Conference	Alias	Founded	Defunct	Type	Predecessor	Successor
Rowing Association of American Colleges	RAAC	1870	1894	Rowing		Intercollegiate Rowing Association
Intercollegiate Rowing Association	IRA	1895		Rowing	Rowing Association of American Colleges	
Intercollegiate Cricket Association	ICA	1881	1924	Cricket		
Eastern Intercollegiate Basketball League	Ivy League	1901	1955	Basketball		Ivy League
Eastern Intercollegiate Wrestling Association	EIWA	1903		Wrestling		
Ivy League	Ivies	1954		NCAA	Rowing Association of American Colleges, Intercollegiate Cricket Association, Eastern Intercollegiate Basketball League, Eastern Intercollegiate Wrestling Association	
Big Ten Conference	B1G	1896		NCAA	Intercollegiate Conference of Faculty Representatives, Western Conference, Big Nine, does not retain legacy of Intercollegiate Athletic Association of the Northwest	
Intercollegiate Athletic Association of the Northwest	IAAN	1892	1893	Football, Baseball, Track		Big Ten Conference
Southwest Conference	SWC	1914	1996	NCAA	Southwest Intercollegiate Athletic Conference	Big 12 Conference, Western Athletic Conference, Conference USA
Big 12 Conference	Big 12	1994*		NCAA	Southwest Conference, Big Eight Conference, but does not retain legacy of either*	
Pac-12 Conference	Pac-12	1915		NCAA	Pacific Coast Conference, (Note: The Pacific Coast Conference operated under a separate charter from the conference now known as the Pac-12. While the PCC dissolved in 1959, the Pac-12 claims that conference's history as its own.) Athletic Association of Western Universities, Pacific-8, Pacific-10	
Missouri Valley Conference	MVC / Valley	1907		NCAA	Shares founding members with Big Eight Conference	
Big Eight Conference	Big 8	1907	1996	NCAA	Missouri Valley Intercollegiate Athletic Association, Big Six Conference, Big Seven Conference, Big Eight Conference	Big 12 Conference
Border Conference		1931	1962	NCAA	Border Intercollegiate Athletic Association	Western Athletic Conference, Pac-12 Conference, Big 12 Conference
Skyline Conference	Skyline Eight	1938	1962	NCAA	Mountain States Athletic Conference, Big Seven, Skyline Six	Western Athletic Conference, Mountain West
Western Athletic Conference	WAC	1962		NCAA	Border Conference, Skyline Conference, Pac-12 Conference	Pac-12 Conference, Mountain West, Conference USA
Metro Conference	Metro	1975	1995	NCAA		Conference USA, Big East, American Conference
American Conference (Note: Known as the American Athletic Conference from 2013–2025.)	American	1979		NCAA	Big East	
Big East Conference	Big East	1979		NCAA	Atlantic 10 Conference	American Conference, Atlantic Coast Conference, Big East Conference
Southern Intercollegiate Athletic Association	SIAA	1892	1947	NCAA		Southeastern Conference, Atlantic Coast Conference, Big 12 Conference, Conference USA, Ohio Valley Conference, Southern Athletic Association, and others
Southern Conference	SoCon	1921		NCAA	Southern Intercollegiate Athletic Association	Southeastern Conference, Atlantic Coast Conference, Metro Conference, Atlantic 10 Conference, Coastal Athletic Association, Conference USA
Southeastern Conference	SEC	1932		NCAA	Southern Intercollegiate Athletic Association, Southern Conference, Big 12 Conference	
Atlantic Coast Conference	ACC	1953		NCAA	Southern Intercollegiate Athletic Association, Southern Conference, Metro Conference, Big East	
Mid-American Conference	MAC	1946		NCAA		
Southwestern Athletic Conference	SWAC	1920		NCAA		
Big West Conference	BWC	1968		NCAA	Pacific Coast Athletic Association	Western Athletic Conference, Mountain West
West Coast Conference	WCC	1952		NCAA	California Basketball Association, West Coast Athletic Conference	Big West Conference, Western Athletic Conference, Mountain West
Atlantic 10 Conference	A-10	1976		NCAA	Eastern Collegiate Basketball League, Eastern Athletic Association, Eastern 8	Big East, American Athletic Conference
Yankee Conference		1947 (Note: The Yankee Conference was an all-sports conference until 1976, when it became a football-only league.)	1997	NCAA	New England Conference	Atlantic 10 Conference, CAA Football (Note: CAA Football is technically separate from the all-sports Coastal Athletic Association, though administered by the latter.)
Coastal Athletic Association Football Conference	CAA Football	2007		NCAA	New England Conference, (Note: Despite significant continuity between the New England Conference and Yankee Conference, CAA Football does not recognize the former as an ancestor.) Yankee Conference, (Note: The all-sports CAA and CAA Football consider the latter's history to have started with the formation of the Yankee Conference.) Atlantic 10 Conference	
Coastal Athletic Association	CAA	1979		NCAA	ECAC	
New England Conference		1923	1947	NCAA	New England College Conference of Intercollegiate Athletics	Yankee Conference
Interstate Intercollegiate Athletic Conference	IIAC	1908	1970	NCAA	Illinois Intercollegiate Athletic Conference	
Western Collegiate Hockey Association	WCHA	1951		Hockey	Midwest Collegiate Hockey League, Western Intercollegiate Hockey League	
ECAC Hockey	ECAC	1961		Hockey	Eastern College Athletic Conference, ECAC Hockey League	
North Central Conference	NCC	1922	2008	Division II		Northern Sun, Summit
Northern California Athletic Conference	NCAC	1925	1996	Division II	Far Western Conference	
Central Intercollegiate Athletic Association	CIAA	1912		Division II	Colored Intercollegiate Athletic Association	
Conference Carolinas	CVAC	1930		Division II	North State Conference, Carolinas Intercollegiate Athletic Conference, Carolinas-Virginia Athletics Conference	
California Collegiate Athletic Association	CCAA	1938		Division II		
Lone Star Conference	LSC	1931		Division II		
Mid-America Intercollegiate Athletics Association	MIAA	1912		Division II	Missouri Intercollegiate Athletic Association	
Northern Sun Intercollegiate Conference	NSIC	1932		Division II	Northern Teachers Athletic Conference, State Teacher's College Conference of Minnesota, Northern Intercollegiate Conference, Northern Sun Conference	
Rocky Mountain Athletic Conference	RMAC	1909		Division II	Colorado Faculty Athletic Conference, Rocky Mountain Faculty Athletic Conference	
Southern Intercollegiate Athletic Conference	SIAC	1913		Division II		
West Virginia Intercollegiate Athletic Conference	WVIAC	1924	2013	Division II		Mountain East, Great Midwest
American Rivers Conference	A-R-C	1922		Division III	Iowa Intercollegiate Athletic Conference	
Middle Atlantic Conferences	MAC	1912		Division III	Middle Atlantic States Collegiate Athletics Association, Middle Atlantic States Collegiate Athletic Conference	
Midwest Conference	MWC	1921		Division III	Midwest Collegiate Athletic Conference, Midwest Athletic Conference for Women	
Minnesota Intercollegiate Athletic Conference	MIAC	1920		Division III		
Northwest Conference	NWC	1926		Division III		
Ohio Athletic Conference	OAC	1902		Division III		
Southern California Intercollegiate Athletic Conference	SCIAC	1915		Division III		
Wisconsin Intercollegiate Athletic Conference	WIAC	1913		Division III	Inter-Normal Athletic Conference of Wisconsin, Wisconsin State Teachers College Conference, Wisconsin State College Conference, Wisconsin State University Athletic Conference	

== See also ==
- List of NCAA conferences
- List of NAIA conferences
- National Junior College Athletic Association
- List of defunct college football conferences
