= NJCAA Division II men's basketball championship =

American junior college tournament

The National Junior College Athletic Association (NJCAA) Men's Division II Basketball Championships consists of twenty teams playing over a six-day period (Monday through Saturday) in March to determine a National Champion.

== About the tournament ==
Teams qualify for the tournament by first winning their district/region championships or by receiving an "At-Large" bid. The NJCAA Division II Men's Basketball Committee then seeds all twenty teams using three criteria including the national poll, the coaches' rankings, and each team's history.

Since 1994, Danville Area Community College has hosted the tournament in the Mary Miller Gymnasium.

== Past results ==
Year	Winner	Runner-up	Score
1986	Parkland College	Keystone Junior College	88-72
1987	Oakland Community College	Community College of Allegheny County	91-90 (OT)
1988	Lansing Community College	Parkland College	91-85
1989	Delta College	St. Louis Community College (Meramec)	77-71
1990	Community College of Allegheny County	Muskegon Community College	85-76
1991	Danville Area Community College	Brookhaven College	89-81
1992	Owens Technical College	Iowa Lakes Community College	105-86
1993	Owens Technical College	Northeastern Christian Junior College	109-85
1994	Joliet Junior College	Owens Technical College	85-80
1995	North Iowa Area Community College	Grand Rapids Community College	64-63
1996	Penn Valley Community College	Kishwaukee College	93-88
1997	Community College of Beaver County	Penn Valley Community College	83-81
1998	Kirkwood Community College	Sinclair Community College	73-61
1999	Brown Mackie College	Danville Area Community College	68-63
2000	Community College of Baltimore County	Rose State College	88-77
2001	Johnson County Community College	Mott Community College	91-76
2002	Redlands Community College	Penn Valley Community College	58-57
2003	Mott Community College	Lackawanna College	76-75 (OT)
2004	Cuyahoga Community College	Mott Community College	74-67
2005	Brown Mackie College	Kirkwood Community College	77-65
2006	Cecil Community College	Kirkwood Community College	64-63
2007	Mott Community College	Monroe Community College	75-61
2008	Mott Community College	Columbus State Community College	83-73
2009	Johnson County Community College	Kirkwood Community College	63-49
2010	Lincoln College	Cincinnati State Community College	71-60
2011	Lincoln College	Mott Community College	74-67
2012	Mott Community College	Community College of Rhode Island	70-60
2013	Rend Lake College	Moraine Valley Community College	87-69
2014	Phoenix College	Essex County College	71-67
2015	Richard Bland College	John Wood Community College	64-53
2016	Kirkwood Community College	Triton College	83-76
2017	Southwestern Community College	Louisburg College	77-52
2018	Triton College	Pima Community College	89-85
2019	Kirkwood Community College	Johnson County Community College	64-58
2021	Des Moines Area Community College	Davidson-Davie Community College	86-75
2022	South Suburban College	Davidson-Davie Community College	79-63
2023	Milwaukee Area Technical College	Macomb Community College	86-65
2024	National Park College	South Suburban College	84-79
2025	Kirkwood Community College	Parkland College	55-54
2026	Parkland College	Ellsworth Community College	76-68

== See also ==
- List of Division 2 NJCAA schools
- NJCAA Men's Division I Basketball Championship
- NJCAA Men's Division III Basketball Championship
- NJCAA Women's Basketball Championship
