= Illinois Skyway Conference =

College athletic conference in the United States

Illinois Skyway Collegiate Conference
- Association: NJCAA
- Division: Region 4
- Region: Northern Illinois
- Official website: https://skyway.prestosports.com/landing/index

The Illinois Skyway Collegiate Conference is an athletic conference associated with the National Junior College Athletic Association (NJCAA). The conference consists of eight community colleges located in the suburbs of Chicago. The conference supports a wide range of intercollegiate athletic sports and student activities events.

== Member schools ==
=== Current members ===
The Illinois Skyway (or ISCC) currently has eight full members, all are public schools:

| Institution | Location (Note: All locations are within the State of Illinois.) | Founded | Affiliation | Enrollment | Nickname | Joined |
|---|---|---|---|---|---|---|
| College of Lake County | Grayslake | 1967 | Public (Note: Part of the Illinois Community College System.) | 12,117 | Lancers | 1969 |
| Elgin Community College | Elgin | 1949 | Public | 8,050 | Spartans | 1969 |
| McHenry County College | Crystal Lake | 1967 | Public | 7,085 | Scots | 1969 |
| Moraine Valley Community College | Palos Hills | 1967 | Public | 10,578 | Cyclones | 1995 |
| Morton College | Cicero | 1924 | Public | 3,850 | Panthers | 1977 |
| Oakton College | Des Plaines | 1969 | Public | 7,433 | Owls | 1969 |
| Prairie State College | Chicago Heights | 1958 | Public | 2,618 | Pioneers | 2003 |
| Waubonsee Community College | Sugar Grove | 1966 | Public | 7,564 | Chiefs | 1969 |

=== Former members ===
The Illinois Skyway (or ISCC) had four full members, all were public schools:

| Institution | Location (Note: All locations are within the State of Illinois.) | Founded | Affiliation | Enrollment | Nickname | Joined | Left | Current conference |
|---|---|---|---|---|---|---|---|---|
| Harper College | Palatine | 1965 | Public (Note: Part of the Illinois Community College System.) | 13,477 | Hawks | 1969 | 1975 | North Central (N4C) (NJCAA Region IV) |
| Triton College | River Grove | 1964 | Public | 10,931 | Trojans | 1969 | 1975 | Independent (NJCAA Region IV) |
| Truman College | Chicago | 1956 | Public (Note: Part of the City Colleges of Chicago System.) | 5,186 | Falcons | 1969 | 1993 | Independent (NJCAA Region IV) |
| Wilbur Wright College | Chicago | 1934 | Public | 9,367 | Rams | 1982 | 1993 | Independent (NJCAA Region IV) |

== See also ==
- North Central Community College Conference, also in Region 4
- Arrowhead Conference, also in Region 4
