= John A. Logan College =

Community college in Carterville, Illinois, US

- Type: Public Community college
- Established: 1967; 59 years ago
- Parent institution: Illinois Community College System
- President: Kirk Overstreet
- Students: 3,369 (Spring 2025)
- Location: Carterville, Illinois, United States; 37°44′52″N 89°05′20″W
- Colors
- Nickname: Vols
- Sporting affiliations: NJCAA Division I Great Rivers Athletic Conference
- Website: www.jalc.edu

John A. Logan College is a public community college in Carterville, Illinois. It is part of the Illinois Community College System. As of 2022, it had a total enrollment of 3,272 students.

== History ==
John A. Logan College was established in 1967 under the Illinois Junior College Act of 1965, enrolled its first students in the fall of 1968, and acquired its permanent campus in 1969. The college is named for John A. Logan, a Civil War general who also, before and after the war, represented Illinois in the United States Congress as a member of both the House before the war, and Senate, after the war.

In 2016, John A. Logan College faced criticism after terminating multiple full-time faculty members due to budgetary constraints. The layoffs affected several academic departments and led to protests from faculty, students, and community members who argued that the cuts negatively impacted educational quality. Critics accused the administration of financial mismanagement, highlighting concerns that institutional spending priorities favored administrative costs over academic programs. The decision resulted in tensions between the administration and the faculty union, prompting calls for increased transparency in budgetary decision-making.

Three years later, the college was involved in a controversy regarding the destruction of official administrative meeting notes. Reports indicated that key documents were intentionally burned, raising concerns about transparency and compliance with Illinois public records laws. The incident drew public attention when college legal counsel Rhett Barkey defended the administration’s actions, stating that the notes were considered "unofficial" and did not fall under public record requirements. However, critics, including faculty and transparency advocates, argued that the destruction of documents undermined public trust in the institution. While no formal legal actions were taken, the controversy heightened tensions between faculty, staff, and the college administration, further fueling concerns about governance and accountability at the institution.

In 2020, college administrators suspended diversity and inclusion activities in response to an executive order issued by then-President Donald Trump. The order, which prohibited certain diversity training programs for federal contractors and grant recipients, led the college to halt related initiatives while conducting a review of its policies. The suspension drew criticism from faculty, students, and advocacy groups who argued that the move undermined efforts to promote inclusivity and address systemic inequities in higher education. The decision was later revisited following the executive order’s revocation by the Biden administration in 2021.

== Academics ==
The college offers career preparation programs and two-year college transfer curriculum. Logan's transfer curriculum is articulated with Illinois' four-year universities. Online offerings include noncredit courses on topics not normally found in the higher education curriculum.

The college has been accredited since 1972 by the Higher Learning Commission of the North Central Association of Colleges and Schools. In 2008, the Higher Learning Commission approved it to offer an online Associate of Arts degree.

Under its open admissions policy, the college admits students who have graduated from an accredited high school, completed the GED, or are at least 18 years old. Applicants who have not graduated from high school must submit evidence of their ability to do college-level work.

In 2025, John A. Logan College reported a 100% pass rate for its practical nursing program and a 98% pass rate for its associate degree nursing program.

== Athletics ==
Intercollegiate team sports offerings include baseball (men's), basketball (men's and women's), golf (men's and women's), softball (women's), and volleyball (women's). College teams compete in the Great Rivers Athletic Conference and Region 24 of the National Junior College Athletic Association. The college mascot is the "Volunteers." usually shortened to "Vols".

== Financial aid ==
In 2025, the college announced the Promise Scholarship, a last-dollar program for eligible in-district students that covers remaining tuition costs after other financial aid and scholarships are applied.

== John A. Logan College Museum ==
The John A. Logan College Museum on the college campus provides exhibits and educational programs focused on southern Illinois, including its visual arts, cultural heritage, and natural history. A special feature of the museum is the Purdy School, a one-room schoolhouse from southern Perry County, Illinois, that served as a public school from around 1860 until 1951 and was moved to the campus in 1983. The museum also displays works by regional artists and crafts persons, ethnic textiles, and prints by Salvador Dalí.

== Notable alumni ==
- Stan Gouard, college basketball player and coach (Southern Indiana)
- Rick McCarty, college baseball coach (Abilene Christian)
- Jay Scrubb, basketball player
