= North Central Community College Conference =

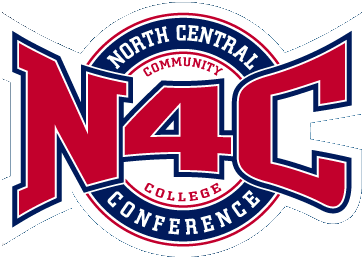
- Association: NJCAA
- Founded: 1970; 56 years ago
- Division: Region 4
- Region: Illinois, Wisconsin

The North Central Community College Conference (N4C) was part of the National Junior College Athletic Association (NJCAA). Conference championships were held and individuals can be named to All-Conference and All-Academic teams.

The founding members of 1970 were the College of Du Page, Illinois Valley Community College, Joliet Junior College, Morton College, Rock Valley College, and Thornton Community College. The conference dissolved at the end of the 2022–23 school year.

== Member schools ==
=== Current members ===
==== Full ====
The NCCCC (or N4C) currently has five full members, all are public schools:

Institution	Location	Founded	Affiliation	Enrollment	Nickname	Joined
College of DuPage	Glen Ellyn, Illinois	1967	Public (Note: Part of the Illinois Community College System.)	20,849	Chaparrals	?
Harper College	Palatine, Illinois	1965	Public	13,477	Hawks	?
Joliet Junior College	Joliet, Illinois	1901	Public	10,267	Wolves	?
Madison Area Technical College	Madison, Wisconsin	1912	Public (Note: Part of the Wisconsin Technical College System.)	30,065	WolfPack	?
Milwaukee Area Technical College	Milwaukee, Wisconsin	1912	Public	35,473	Stormers	?

=== Former members ===
The NCCCC (or N4C) had two former full members, both were public schools:

==== Full ====
Institution	Location	Founded	Affiliation	Enrollment	Nickname	Joined	Left	Current conference
Rock Valley College	Rockford, Illinois	1964	Public (Note: Part of the Illinois Community College System.)	5,762	Golden Eagles	?	2022	Independent (NJCAA Region IV)
Triton College	River Grove, Illinois	1964	Public	10,931	Trojans	1975	2020	Independent (NJCAA Region IV)

==== Associate ====
The NCCCC (or N4C) had one associate member, which was also a public school:

Institution	Location	Founded	Affiliation	Enrollment	Nickname	Joined	Left	Primary conference
Wilbur Wright College	Chicago, Illinois	1934	Public (Note: Part of the City Colleges of Chicago System.)	9,367	Rams	2012	2020	Independent (NJCAA Region IV)

== Sports ==
=== Men's ===
- Baseball
- Basketball
- Soccer

=== Women's ===
- Basketball
- Soccer
- Softball
- Volleyball

== See also ==
- Illinois Skyway Conference, also in Region 4
- Arrowhead Conference, also in Region 4
