= Illinois Community College System =

U.S. state educational governance body

The Illinois Community College System consists of 39 public community college districts, composed of 48 community colleges and one multi-college center (East St. Louis Community College Center) where 3 of the community colleges offer additional classes. Thirty-seven of the districts have a single college; two districts (City Colleges of Chicago, comprising seven colleges, and Illinois Eastern Community Colleges, comprising four colleges) are multicollege. Since July 1990, the entire state has been included within community college district boundaries.

== History ==
Illinois has played a prominent role in the development of the community and junior college movement in the United States. Joliet Junior College, established in 1901, was the first public junior college in the nation. It was the brain child of William Rainey Harper, president of the University of Chicago, and J. Stanley Brown, the superintendent of Joliet Township High School. The college's initial enrollment was six students.

William Rainey Harper

Brown and Harper's innovation was designed to serve students who desired to remain within the community and still pursue a college education. Within a few years, the concept had grown to include students outside the existing high school district. By December 1902, the board of trustees officially sanctioned the program and made post-high school courses available tuition-free. In 1916, the post-high school program was formally named "Joliet Junior College." The next year, the North Central Association of Colleges and Schools accredited the college, and the State Examining Board approved selected courses for teacher certification. Enrollment at the time numbered 82 students.

In 1931, Illinois adopted its first junior college legislation, which permitted the Chicago Board of Education to establish, manage, and provide for the maintenance of one junior college offering two years of college work beyond the high school level as part of the public school system of the city.

The first Junior College Act became law on July 1, 1937, and provided for the development of the junior college system as a part of the public school system. That act neither provided for charging tuition nor specified that the education was to be provided without charge to the students. In 1943 the Illinois General Assembly enacted legislation to allow referendums to establish tax rates for both education and building funds to support junior college operations. In 1951 legislation was adopted which set forth standards and procedures for establishing junior colleges. This legislation also repealed the prior law which had allowed the board of education in districts with population in excess of 25,000 to establish a junior college by resolution. In 1959 separate junior college districts were authorized by allowing any compact and contiguous territory to be organized as a junior college district with an elected board of education with authority to maintain and operate the college and levy taxes for its operation.

State funding for junior college operations was first appropriated in 1955. Seven new public junior colleges were established in Illinois between 1955 and 1962, bringing the total to 18. Rock Island, Moline, and East Moline joined to form Black Hawk College in 1961, the first junior college created separate from a common school district.

In 1961, the General Assembly created the Illinois Board of Higher Education to conduct comprehensive studies on higher education needs; develop information systems; approve new units of instruction, research, or public service in all public colleges and universities; review budgets of public colleges and universities, and make recommendations to the governor and General Assembly; approve capital improvements; conduct surveys and evaluation of higher education; and prepare "a master plan for the development, expansion, integration, coordination, and efficient utilization of the facilities, curricula, and standards of higher education in the areas of teaching, research, and public service." Although junior colleges were under the jurisdiction of the superintendent of public instruction at this time, the enabling legislation for the Illinois Board of Higher Education charged the board, in developing " a master plan of higher education" to "give consideration to the problems and attitudes of junior colleges...as they relate to the overall policies and problems of higher education."

Based upon the higher education master plan, the Junior College Act of 1965 was enacted, providing the foundation for the present system of public community colleges in Illinois. The act removed the junior colleges from the common school system and placed them under the jurisdiction of the Illinois Board of Higher Education. It provided for establishment of a system of locally initiated and administered comprehensive Class I junior college districts; required that all junior colleges operating in school districts where separate tax levies had been established for the college become separate junior colleges, classified as Class II districts and established procedures for converting Class II districts to Class I districts. School districts operating a junior college without a separate tax could continue to maintain the program as grades 13 and 14. The act allowed creation of junior college districts with locally elected boards. The local districts were coordinated and regulated by a new Illinois Junior College Board, which in turn reported to the Illinois Board of Higher Education, as did the governing boards of the other public colleges and universities. The act provided for local-state sharing of capital funding, acquisition of sites, operational funding, and annexations and disconnections of territory. State and local financial support for junior colleges became an obligation of all Illinois residents, whether they resided within the boundaries of a junior college district or not.

On July 15, 1965, the Junior College Act became effective; and on August 1 the school boards of districts operating junior colleges with separate educational and building rates became the boards of the newly constituted Class II districts. Also in August 1965 governor Otto Kerner, Jr. appointed nine members of the first Illinois Junior College Board.

In 1973, the term "junior college" was changed to "community college" by statute, but one college (Joliet Junior College) in the system has retained the term "junior" in its name.

Community college district numbers are given for each district. Some colleges were established by school districts prior to being organized as college districts. Two are no longer functional.

== Governance ==
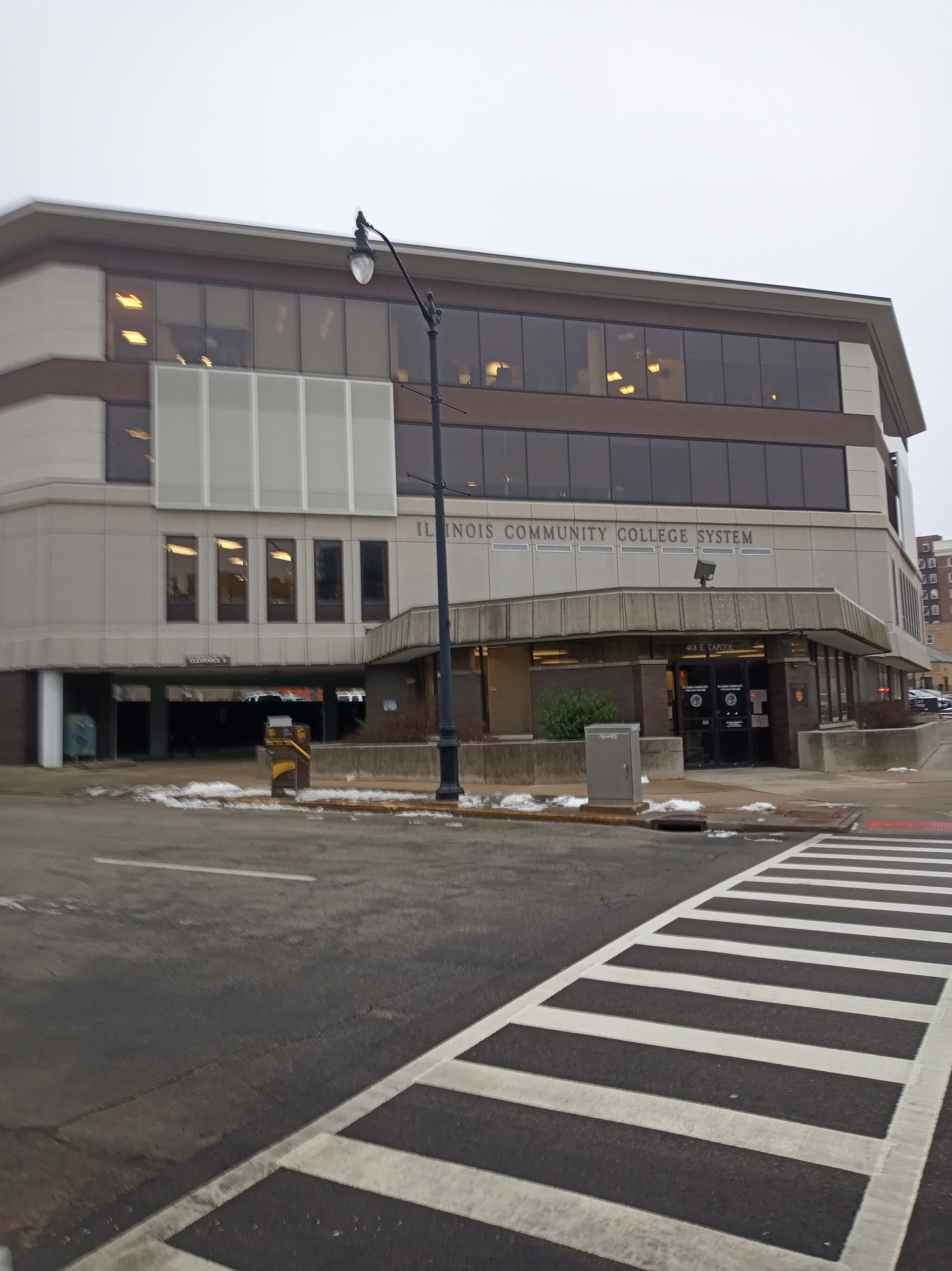
Headquarters of the Illinois Community College System in Springfield.

The Illinois community college system has a three-tier governance system. Each community college district has a locally elected board of trustees, with the exception of City Colleges of Chicago, whose local board is appointed by the mayor of Chicago. The Illinois Community College Board (ICCB) is the state coordinating board for community colleges. The Illinois Board of Higher Education is the administrative agency with responsibility for overseeing all higher education in Illinois.

=== Illinois Community College Board ===
The ICCB consists of 11 members appointed by the Illinois governor, and one nonvoting member selected by the Student Advisory Committee. Board members are appointed at large for six-year terms. The chair is appointed by the governor and the vice chair is elected by board members. The ICCB meets six to eight times a year. The members of the board must be citizens and residents of the state of Illinois. Members of the board cannot receives a regular salary from public funds and cannot hold current membership on a school board or a board of trustees of a public or nonpublic college, university, or technical institute.

The role of the ICCB is to administer the Public Community College Act. Its duties and responsibilities include:

- developing procedures to maximize freedom of transfer among community colleges and between community colleges and degree-granting institutions
- conducting feasibility studies for new community colleges
- approving all locally funded capital projects
- determining standards for community colleges for instruction and teaching, curriculum, library, operation, maintenance, administration, and supervision
- approving or disapproving new units of instruction, research, and public service

=== Illinois Board of Higher Education ===
The Illinois Board of Higher Education is the administrative agency with responsibility for all higher education sectors in Illinois. As such, it approves the instructional programs, capital projects, and systemwide operating and capital budgets for the public community college system after action by the ICCB. In addition, the Illinois Board of Higher Education periodically reviews all existing programs at community colleges and universities and advises the appropriate board when such programs are not academically and economically justified.

== Finance ==
Illinois community colleges receive funding from three major sources: local property taxes, student tuition and fees, and state appropriations. By statute, each local community college board of trustees may set tuition rates for its indistrict residents including variable rates for each of its programs, terms, time of enrollment, courses, delivery method, or other identifiable grouping of courses as long as the weighted average of the tuition for all credit courses including adult education is no more than 1/3 the college district's per capita cost. The method of calculating the per capita cost is as prescribed in Section 6-2 of the Illinois Community College Act. Community colleges also receive revenue from a variety of other federal, state, and local sources. For example, the Illinois State Board of Education distributes grants for adult education and vocational education in support of specific instructional programs.

== Programs ==
Illinois community colleges offer approximately 3,500 associate degrees and certificates in a variety of programs, including:

- the first two years of work toward a bachelor's degree to prepare students to transfer to four-year colleges and universities
- remedial/developmental education for individuals needing basic education skills in order to seek employment or pursue further education
- occupational education from among 240 specialties for employment training or retraining.

All programs offered within the community college system must be approved by the ICCB and Illinois Board of Higher Education on the basis of need, quality, and cost. Every community college evaluate each of its existing education programs and services on a five-year cycle to ensure that the programs continue to be justified on the basis of need, quality, and cost.

Transfer degrees meet Illinois models for the specific programs and use a common general education core and numerous major-specific courses that are transferable to all public higher education institutions in the state. Occupational degrees are designed to meet the criteria for excellence established by the National Council for Occupational Education of the American Association of Community Colleges.

== Colleges ==
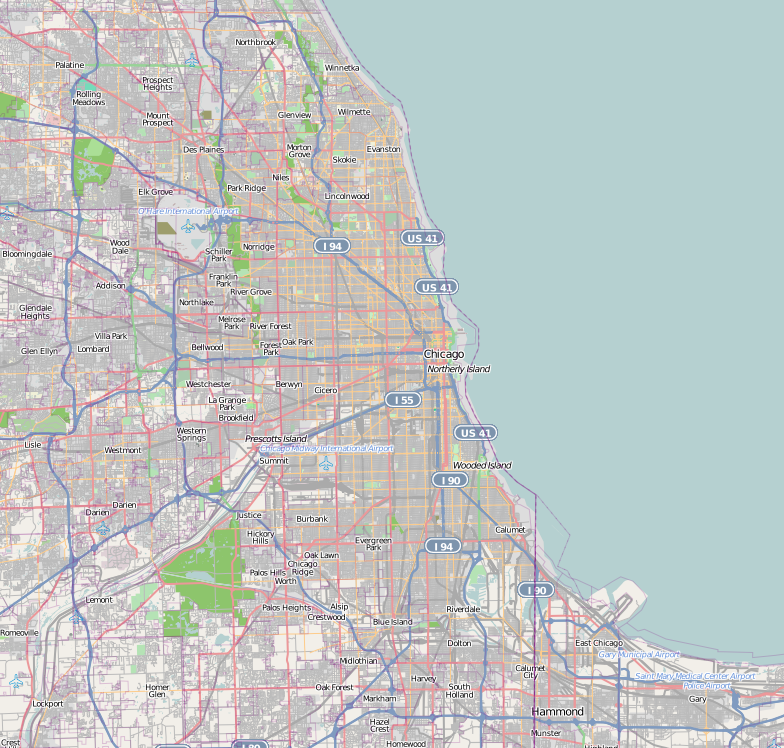
Location of Illinois Community Colleges in the Chicago Metropolitan Area. Red dots represent member institutions of the City Colleges of Chicago.
Location of Illinois Community Colleges. For colleges with multiple campuses, the largest campus is labeled. Red dots represent member institutions of Illinois Eastern Community Colleges.

Illinois Community College System
Name	Established	Enrollment	Location
Black Hawk College	1946	6,094	Rock Island County
Carl Sandburg College	1966	2,443	Knox County
College of DuPage	1967	36,245	DuPage County
College of Lake County	1967	20,233	Lake County
Danville Area Community College	1946	4,074	Vermilion County
Elgin Community College	1949	11,788	Kane County
Frontier Community College	1976	3,257	Wayne County
Harold Washington College	1962	9,519	Cook County
Harper College	1965	22,623	Cook County
Harry S Truman College	1956	8,110	Cook County
Heartland Community College	1990	7,621	McLean County
Highland Community College	1962	2,558	Stephenson County
Illinois Central College	1967	11,132	Tazewell County
Illinois Valley Community College	1924	3,772	LaSalle County
John A. Logan College	1967	6,975	Williamson County
John Wood Community College	1974	2,724	Adams County
Joliet Junior College	1901	20,745	Will County
Kankakee Community College	1966	3,791	Kankakee County
Kaskaskia College	1940	4,822	Clinton County
Kennedy–King College	1935	2,866	Cook County
Kishwaukee College	1968	3,842	DeKalb County
Lake Land College	1966	12,367	Coles County
Lewis and Clark Community College	1970	6,471	Madison County
Lincoln Land Community College	1967	8,670	Sangamon County
Lincoln Trail College	1969	933	Crawford County
Malcolm X College	1911	10,432	Cook County
McHenry County College	1967	11,883	McHenry County
Moraine Valley Community College	1967	17,693	Cook County
Morton College	1924	5,387	Cook County
Oakton College	1969	14,960	Cook County
Olive–Harvey College	1970	3,068	Cook County
Olney Central College	1963	1,365	Richland County
Parkland College	1966	9,133	Champaign County
Prairie State College	1957	5,689	Cook County
Rend Lake College	1955	3,081	Jefferson County
Richard J. Daley College	1960	8,361	Cook County
Richland Community College	1971	3,499	Macon County
Rock Valley College	1964	8,551	Winnebago County
Sauk Valley Community College	1965	2,290	Lee County
Shawnee Community College	1967	2,663	Pulaski County
South Suburban College	1927	7,210	Cook County
Southeastern Illinois College	1960	2,196	Saline County
Southwestern Illinois College	1946	13,299	St. Clair County
Spoon River College	1959	1,684	Fulton County
Triton College	1964	14,714	Cook County
Wabash Valley College	1969	9,274	Wabash County
Waubonsee Community College	1966	13,452	Kane County
Wilbur Wright College	1934	11,855	Cook County

== See also ==
- List of community colleges § Illinois
