= Spoon River College =

Community college in Canton, Illinois, US

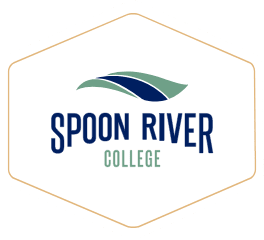
- Canton, Illinois campus
- Former name: Canton Community College
- Type: Public community college
- Established: 1959
- Parent institution: Illinois Community College System
- President: Curtis Oldfield
- Students: 1,212 (Fall 2022)
- Location: Canton, Illinois, large extension campus in Macomb, Illinois, U.S. 40°31′40″N 90°4′21″W
- Colours: Navy blue & green
- Sporting affiliations: Mid-West Athletic Conference; NCJAA Division II
- Mascot: Snappers
- Website: www.src.edu

Spoon River College (SRC) is a public community college in Canton, Illinois. It is part of the Illinois Community College System. Spoon River College's district comprises Fulton County and parts of Schuyler County, McDonough County, Mason County, and Knox County in West-Central Illinois.

== History ==
Spoon River College was founded on October 17, 1959, as Canton Community College, after the Canton Union School District passed a referendum to establish a junior college, to allow students from the local high school district the opportunity to receive post-secondary education similar to university curriculum. It held its first classes in 1960, using space in the Canton Senior High School building.

Authorized by the Illinois General Assembly and signed by Illinois Governor Otto Kerner Jr. in 1961, legislation was later enacted that created the Illinois Board of Higher Education (IBHE). The IBHE was tasked by statute with formulating a master plan for higher education in the state of Illinois. In July 1964 the higher education master plan was published by the IBHE, which led to the Junior College Act of 1965. Under the Junior College Act, Canton was classified as a Class II Junior College.

In the mid-1960s, the college moved its operations out of the high school building and into leased space in Canton. In 1968 the formation of Junior College District 534 completed the college's separation from the Canton public school district, and the institution was officially renamed Spoon River College and reclassified as a Class I institution.

== Campus ==
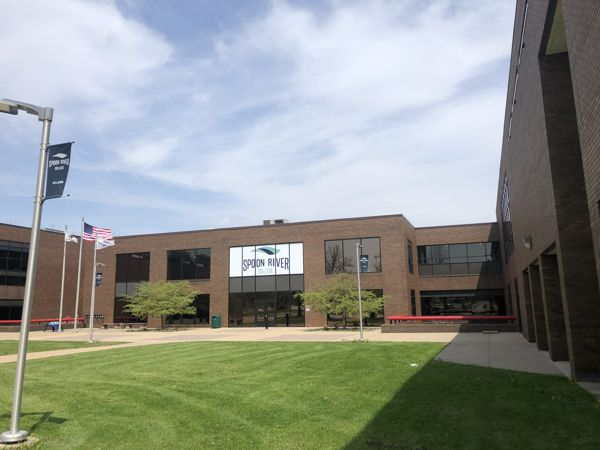

The Spoon River College main campus is on 160 acres (0.65 km^{2}) of land four miles from the city of Canton, Illinois. In 1984, a second location, known as the Macomb Campus, was opened in Macomb, Illinois, and occupies the old Macomb High School building. Since that time, over $3 million has been invested in renovating the building.

In addition to these two campuses, the college holds for-credit classes at learning centers in Havana, Illinois and Rushville, Illinois. Spoon River College also holds non-credit and career development classes at two Community Outreach Centers in Macomb and Canton, Illinois.

High demand for both credit and non-classes and training at the Macomb Campus has led to the building of an expansion center. The $2.2 million phase one portion of the project was completed in August 2009. An $18 million expansion is planned for the extension center in the near future.

== Academics and demographics ==
Spoon River College is accredited by the Higher Learning Commission.

Spoon River College has transfer agreements with four-year colleges and universities such as Western Illinois University, Southern Illinois University Carbondale, and University of Illinois Springfield, as a part of the Illinois Articulation Initiative (IAI), a statewide transfer agreement which ensures general education credits are transferable among more than 100 participating college or universities in Illinois. SRC has a specific dual-enrollment compact with Western Illinois University that began in 1998. The agreement between the schools permits students at SRC to transition into WIU through a pre-defined curriculum and automatic transfer protocol between institutions. In addition to the IAI, SRC offers students a bachelor's degree completion program that allows students to enroll in one of nine participating institutions and take classes at local SRC campuses or online. There are two primary educational tracks at SRC: Transfer Programs, and Career Educational Programs. Transfer students at SRC can earn an Associate in Arts (AA) or an Associate in Science (AS) with over 30 different areas of concentration. Career program students at SRC can earn an Associate in Applied Science (AAS) Degree in eight areas, an associate degree in nursing (ADN), or Certificates in over 30 areas.

=== Enrollment ===
As of April 28, 2011, spring enrollment at SRC was 1,906, of which 943 were enrolled full-time, and 936 were enrolled part-time. In addition, 94 non-credit enrollees were reported by SRC for the same period. In addition, dual credit enrollees obtaining college credit while attending high school stood at 312.

=== Library ===
Spoon River College provides a library within its Learning Resources Center at its main Canton, Illinois Campus. It has facilities for study, research, leisure reading, class preparation, and Internet access for students.

== Student life ==
=== Student housing ===
Although the Illinois Public Community College Act prevents community colleges from building student housing, SRC offers campus housing for its students through a special arrangement with Western Illinois University (WIU). Under a November 1994 agreement between SRC and WIU, SRC students have the opportunity to live in WIU campus housing. The agreement allows a smoother transition for SRC students seeking to transfer to WIU, while allowing the university to utilize unused housing. Spoon River College students who live on the WIU campus also can access WIU's Beu Health Center.

=== Academic clubs and cultural activities ===
SRC hosts several registered student clubs involved in academic, competitive, and cultural based activities. In addition, the campus has an active chapter of Phi Theta Kappa (ΦΘΚ), the international honor society for two-year colleges and academic programs.

SRC also publishes the journal Kaleidoscope, of student produced artwork. It is published each spring and offered to the residents of the college district.
