= Shawnee Community College =

Public college in Ullin, Illinois, US

Coordinates: 37°16′14″N 89°2′2″W

- Former name: Shawnee College
- Type: Public community college
- Established: 1967; 59 years ago
- Parent institution: Illinois Community College System
- President: Tim Taylor
- Students: 1,174 (Fall 2022)
- Location: Ullin, Illinois, U.S.
- Campus: Rural, 152 acres (0.62 km^{2})
- Colors: Maroon
- Nickname: Saints
- Sporting affiliations: NJCAA Division I Great Rivers Athletic Conference
- Website: www.shawneecc.edu

Shawnee Community College (SCC) is a public community college in Ullin, Illinois. It is part of the Illinois Community College System.

== History ==
Shawnee Community College was founded in 1967 as Shawnee College to allow students from Community College District No. 531 the opportunity to receive post-secondary education similar to university curriculum. Authorized by the Illinois General Assembly and signed by Illinois Governor Otto Kerner, Jr. in 1961, the legislation enacted created the Illinois Board of Higher Education (IBHE). The IBHE was tasked by statute with formulating a Master Plan for Higher Education in the state of Illinois. In July 1964 the higher education master plan was published by the IBHE, which led to the Junior College Act of 1965. Soon thereafter, Shawnee Community College was organized as a Class I community college in September 1967. The initial Board of Trustees were selected in December of the same year. The college officially opened on September 24, 1969. It was later renamed in 1987 to Shawnee Community College.

The main campus of Shawnee Community College is located seven miles (11 km) east of Interstate 57 exit 18. The site consists of 152 acres (62 ha), which houses the main campus and facilities. The original campus buildings, now known as the "rustic campus" were erected during the summer of 1969. The main campus buildings were later constructed in 1976. A 21,000-square-foot (2,000 m^{2}) addition was built onto the main campus and completed in January, 1989. The new addition included a biology laboratory, a nursing laboratory, general classrooms, and a large-group meeting room.

In August 2000, SCC opened a 33,000-square-foot (3,100 m^{2}) Educational Center that serves as both an electronic classroom, meeting room, and theater for performing arts.

In August 2008, construction began on a 22,000-square-foot (2,000 m^{2}) Medical Arts and Science Building slated to be completed in January 2010.

Additional campuses are in Anna, Cairo, Metropolis, and Vienna. In 2004, the 10,600-square-foot (980 m^{2}) Metropolis Regional Education and Training Center was opened in Metropolis City Industrial Park, providing a new home to the Metropolis Extension Center. The Cairo Extension Center had its grand opening in December 2018.

== Academics and demographics ==
Shawnee Community College is accredited by the Higher Learning Commission.

Shawnee Community College partners with area four-year colleges and universities, such as Southern Illinois University Carbondale, Southern Illinois University Edwardsville, and Western Illinois University as a part of the Illinois Articulation Initiative (IAI), a statewide transfer agreement which ensures general education credits are transferable among more than 100 participating colleges or universities in Illinois. In addition to the IAI, SCC offers students "two-plus-two" programs that guarantee students that the courses completed at the college will transfer to their majors at four-year baccalaureate institutions. There are five primary divisions at SCC: Transfer Programs, Allied Health Programs, Business Occupational and Technical Programs, Entrepreneurship Programs, Cooperative Programs. The divisions offer a total of 40 associate degree programs, and 52 certificate programs.

=== Enrollment ===
As of April 13, 2009, for-credit Spring enrollment at SCC was 2388, of which 944 were enrolled full-time, and 1444 were enrolled part-time. In addition, 439 non-credit enrollees were reported by RLC for the same period. During the prior spring semester in 2008, student head count at the college rose 9.5 percent from 2007 to 2008 year. Most of the increase in enrollment was attributed to recent layoffs at local factories and plants, as well as the introduction of new programs at the college. In addition, dual credit enrollees obtaining college credit while attending high school increased from 3,415 students, to 5,040 students from 2007 to 2008. In the spring 2009 semester SCC saw a 7.2 percent increase in credit hours, a 16 percent increase in vocational courses, 10 percent increase in baccalaureate classes and 18 percent increase in online enrollment overall. In addition to its traditional enrollment, SCC has seen an increase in its Escrow Program, a dual-enrollment program for high schools student.

=== Libraries ===
Shawnee Community College provides a library within its Learning Resources Center at its main Ullin, Illinois, Campus. The library has several thousand volumes and periodical titles, online resources, and a media learning area. It has facilities for study, research, leisure reading, class preparation, and WIFI access for students.

== Athletics ==
SCC athletic teams compete as the "Saints" in NJCAA Division I in Region 24 in the Great Rivers Athletic Conference.
