= Richland Community College =

Community college in Decatur, Illinois, U.S.

Coordinates: 39°53′1.6″N 88°53′39.2″W

- Former name: Community College of Decatur
- Type: Public community college
- Established: 1971; 55 years ago
- Parent institution: Illinois Community College System
- President: Cristobal Valdez
- Faculty: 60
- Administrative staff: 51
- Students: 2,075 (Fall 2022)
- Location: Decatur, Illinois, U.S.
- Campus: Rural, 153 acres (0.62 km^{2})
- Colors: Blue, green
- Mascot: Knights
- Website: www.richland.edu

Richland Community College (RCC) is a public community college in Decatur, Illinois. It is a part of the Illinois Community College System.

== Students ==
Richland Community College serves approximately 2,075 students annually through its main campus, two extension centers and other off-campus sites throughout the district, as of the fall of 2022. The Continuing and Professional Education Division provides professional development courses, community education courses, and workforce training to over 4,000 people annually.

== Accreditation ==
Richland Community College is accredited by the Higher Learning Commission. Specific programs at the college are accredited by specialized accreditors:

- Associate Degree Nursing (ADN): Accreditation Commission for Education in Nursing, Inc. (ACEN)
- Automotive Technology: National Automotive Technicians Education Foundation (ASE Certification)
- Radiology (AAS): Joint Review Committee on Education in Radiologic Technology (JRCERT)
- Surgical Technology (AAS): Commission on Accreditation of Allied Health Education Programs (CAAHEP)
- Medical Transcription (AAS): Association for Healthcare Documentation Integrity (AHDI)
- Information Technology—Network Technology (AAS): Cisco Certified Network Associate (CCNA) Academy
- Health Information Technology (AAS): Commission on Accreditation for Health Informatics and Information Management Education (CAHIIM)
- Culinary Arts (AAS): American Culinary Federation (ACF)

== Campus locations ==
Richland serves its district with the main campus, located at One College Park in Decatur, and two extension centers. The college's main campus resides on 155 acres (63 ha). Following substantial growth and expansion, Richland currently contains 293,590 sq ft (27,275 m^{2}). Richland Community College has two primary off-campus locations: The Fairview Park Plaza Extension Center and the Clinton Extension Center. Several other off-campus sites, including high schools, host classes for Richland Community College. Fairview Park Plaza Extension Center, 1485 King Street in Decatur, provides classroom space for both credit and non-credit classes. This space is also rented by businesses for training workshops. The Clinton Higher Education Center, located at 140 Sunrise Court in Clinton, Illinois offers admissions, advising, registration, placement testing, virtual testing, financial aid, along with other services. Credit classes and workshops are scheduled in Clinton as well as other communities throughout Richland's district. In addition to regular daytime credit classes held in Clinton, interactive evening credit classes are held via distance learning. General Education Development (GED) and English as a Second Language (ESL) classes are also provided.

Heartland Technical Academy provides dual credit classes for high school students on Richland's main campus. Project READ, (a personal adult-tutoring program for reading and math), is located at the Decatur Public Library, 130 N. Franklin in Decatur. Project READ became a program of Richland Community College since 1988.

== See also ==
- Millikin University
