= Illinois Valley Community College =

Public college in Oglesby, Illinois, U.S.

- IVCC logo
- Former name: LaSalle-Peru-Oglesby (LPO) Junior College
- Type: Community college
- Established: 1924
- Affiliations: Arrowhead Conference (athletics)
- President: Dr. Tracy Morris
- Faculty: 91 (full time), 157 (part time)
- Administrative staff: 541
- Students: 2,687
- Location: Oglesby, Illinois, United States; 41°18′30″N 89°05′46″W
- Mascot: Eagles
- Website: http://www.ivcc.edu

Illinois Valley Community College (IVCC) is a community college in Oglesby, Illinois. The college serves a 2,000-square-mile (5,200 km^{2}) district encompassing all of Putnam and parts of Bureau, LaSalle, DeKalb, Grundy, Lee, Livingston, and Marshall counties. The college sits on a 425-acre (1.72 km^{2}) campus that was constructed in 1972. The college offers associate degrees and certificates and has been accredited by The Higher Learning Commission of the North Central Association of Colleges and Schools since 1929.

== History ==
=== LPO Junior College ===
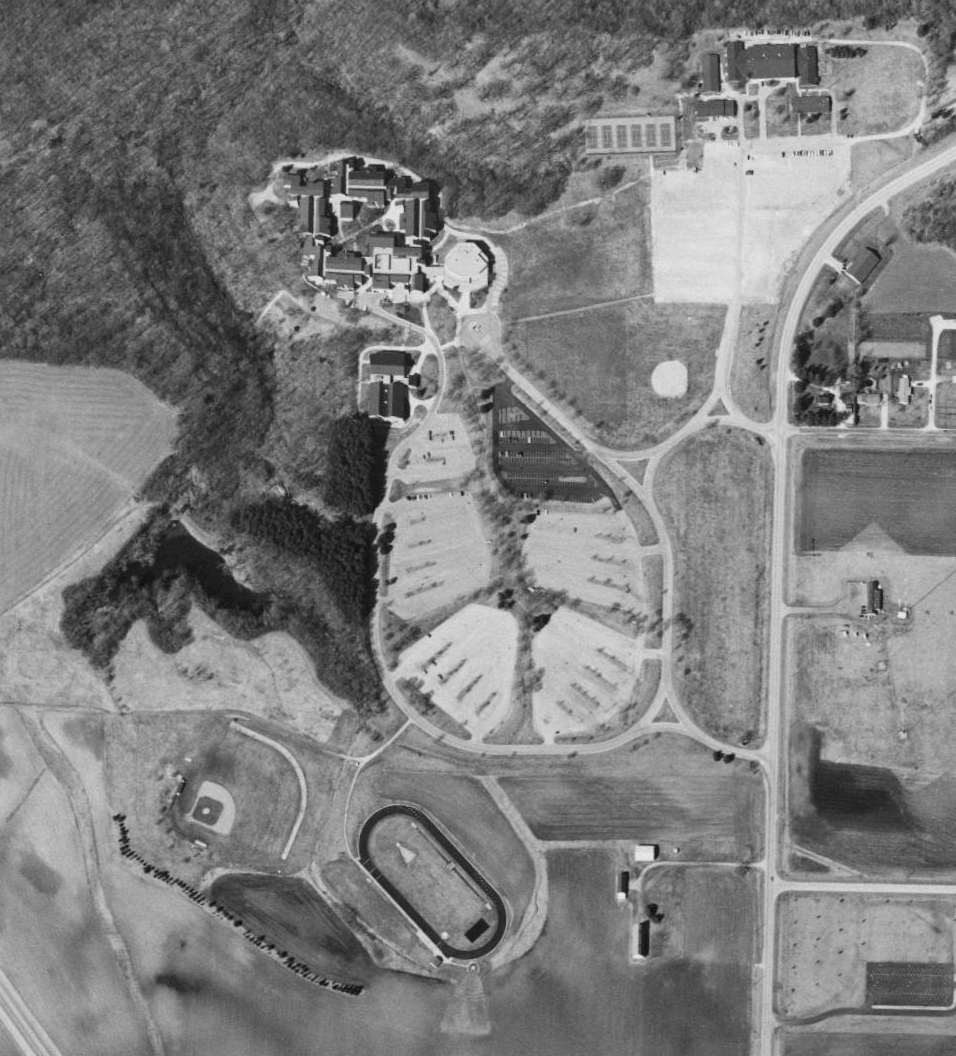
Aerial view of campus

IVCC was founded in 1924 under the name LaSalle-Peru-Oglesby Junior College with an entering class of 32 students studying in facilities provided by the LaSalle-Peru Township High School. The mission of the college during this time period was to lay the foundations for successful careers. The first president of the college was Dr. Thomas J. McCormack, who had served as superintendent of the high school since 1903.

On July 1, 1966, LaSalle-Peru-Oglesby College was given a new name. Illinois Valley Community College replaced LPO, and in the fall of 1968 was relocated to its current location on the opposite side of the Illinois River from the LaSalle-Peru area. The new name seemed fitting because much of the area that the college district encompasses is referred to as the Illinois Valley. The relocation was possible due to an $8.25 million referendum voted on by members of District 513 to finance the beginning of IVCC. The first courses took place in the new location in September, 1968.

=== Alumni ===
Clay Zavada- Major League Baseball player

=== IVCC today ===
The Illinois Valley Community College district encompasses roughly 2,000 square miles (5,200 km^{2}), contains 21 high schools, and includes more than 146,000 residents. The college is accredited by the Higher Learning Commission. The HLC is a division of the North Central Association of Colleges and Schools. In November 2002, IVCC was accepted into the HLC's Academic Quality Improvement Program. The majority of courses occur in buildings A through E, but the campus is not limited to this area. Industrial courses are taught in buildings on the eastern side of the campus, and a cultural center and gym with a fitness center are also present. Although 89% of students attend class during the day, IVCC offers night courses for those whose schedules conflict with the earlier class periods. In 2000 the college opened a branch campus at Ottawa Center. The college is supported by a foundation created in 1976 to manage bequests and other financial gifts to the college. In 2007 the foundation created IVCC's first alumni association. In 2009, Cassie Fuller and Veronica Blue were named to the All-USA Community College Academic Team, placing them in the top 50 and 150 community college students nationwide.

== Student activities and services ==
=== Clubs and athletics ===
The department "complements the student's academic experience through the development of, exposure to, and participation in social, cultural, multicultural, intellectual, recreational, community service and campus governance programs". The college puts on theatrical and musical performances each year. Performers range from students to visiting artists.

IVCC is home to varsity and intramural sports teams. Varsity sports include basketball, baseball, soccer and tennis. The college's Eagle's athletic program is a member of the Arrowhead Conference, that also includes Carl Sandburg College, Black Hawk College, Black Hawk College — East, Kishwaukee College, Highland Community College and Sauk Valley Community College. The college offers eight varsity sports.

=== Services ===
Counselors are available to assist students in developing academic strategies or in determining a career path. Counseling is not limited to academic matters, students facing other issues are welcome to talk to a counselor. In addition to the counseling and advising services, students can use the peer tutoring and reading, writing and study skills lab. Peer tutors are hired by the College to assist other students who are struggling. An on-site bookstore, computer resource center and day care are available.

== Academics ==
=== Programs of study ===
Illinois Valley Community College is primarily a two-year institution; therefore, the majority of the programs offered are either completed in this two-year period, or they set the foundation for students transferring to a 4-year institution. Associate in Applied Science Degrees are completed in two years and prepare students for employment. Computer Aided Engineering and Design, Early Childhood Education and Therapeutic Massage are a few of the two-year programs.

In addition to these programs, forty-one certificate programs are available to students. Certificates offered by the college typically require one to four semesters and prepare students for a vocational career upon completion of the program. Additional associate degrees are available for students planning to transfer to a four-year institution. Associate Degrees in the Arts, Sciences, Engineering Sciences and General Studies are offered to potential transfer students. Even though the IVCC offers a variety of programs, some students will be unable to take the necessary courses for their intended major. For situations such as these, Illinois Valley Community College "maintains a close cooperative agreement with 20 other colleges in the Illinois community college system". Students may complete their degree at the appropriate institution and not have to pay any out-of-district fees.

=== Admissions ===
Illinois Valley Community College generally offers open admission; however, prospective students must have a high school diploma or GED to be enrolled in the institution. Acceptance into the nursing and dental programs is selective, and minimum GPAs are specified for these programs. A minimum 2.0 GPA on a 4.0 scale is required for students planning to enroll in the dental assistant program or the nursing program to be a Licensed practical nurse. A background in laboratory science and a 2.5 GPA are required for students enrolling in the nursing program to be a Registered nurse.

== Transportation ==
The campus of IVCC in Oglesby is served by Bureau & Putnam Area Rural Transit, and North Central Area Transit. Both transit agencies provide demand-response service to campus from their respective areas of service.

== Presidents ==
1. Thomas J. McCormack (1924 - )
2. Francis Dolan (1947–1967)
3. R. Earl Trobaugh (1969–1974)
4. Alfred E. Wisgoski (1974–1996)
5. Jean Goodnow (1996–2005)
6. Charles R. Novak (interim)
7. Larry Huffman (2006–2007)
8. Dave Louis (interim)
9. Jerome Corcoran (2008–2023)
10. Tracy Morris (2023-present)

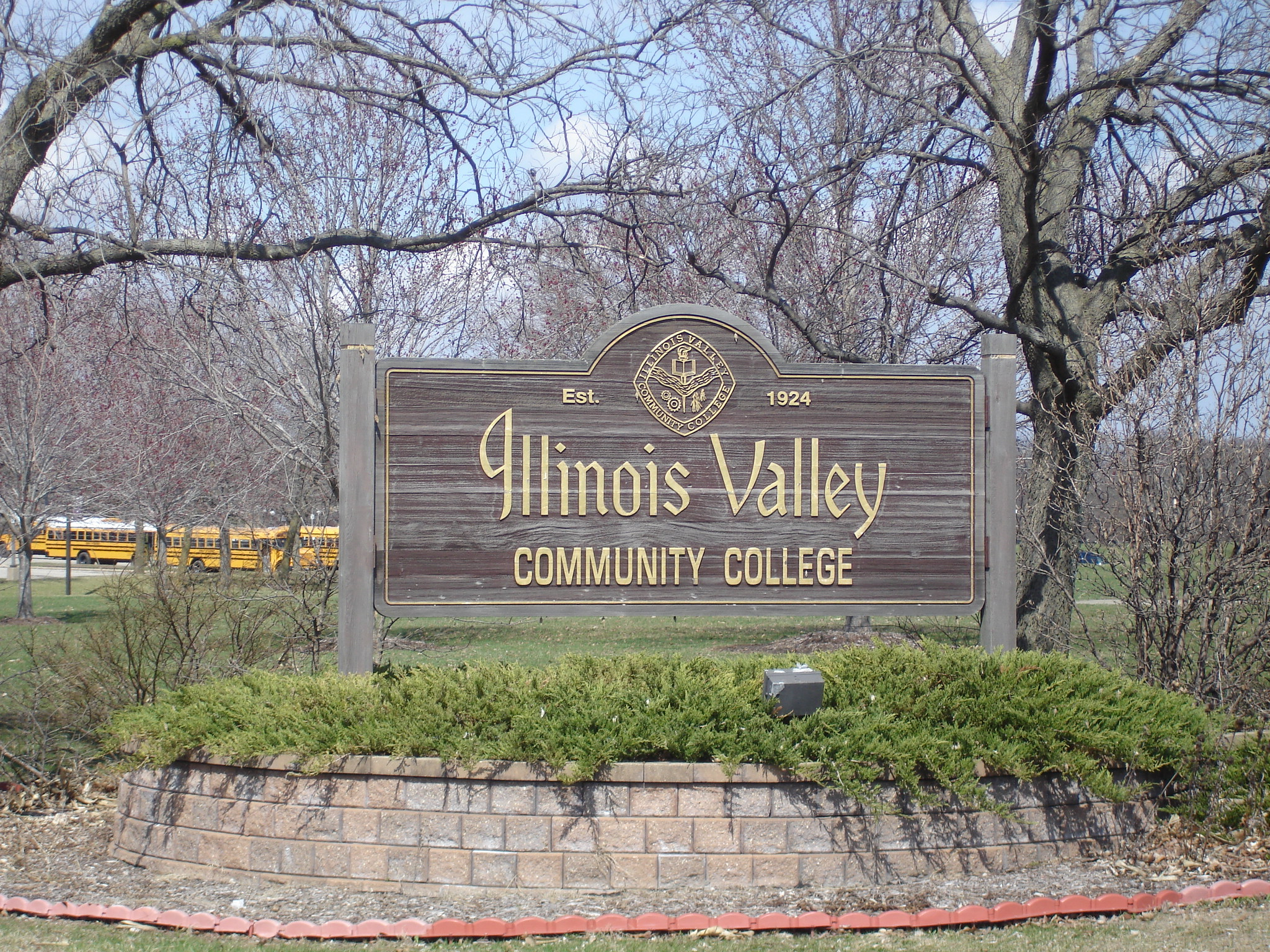

== See also ==
- Illinois Community College System
