= Mid-West Athletic Conference =

NJCAA athletic conference

- Formerly: Collegiate Conference of Central Illinois
- Association: NJCAA
- Founded: 1990; 36 years ago
- Sports fielded: 8; men's: 4; women's: 4
- Division: NJCAA Division II
- No. of teams: 9
- Headquarters: Springfield, Illinois
- Region: Lower Illinois (NJCAA Region 24)
- Official website: http://mwaconference.com/landing/index

The Mid-West Athletic Conference (MWAC) is an athletic conference in the National Junior College Athletic Association (NJCAA). The Mid-West Athletic Conference is a two-year college conference composing the two-year schools in Central and South Central Illinois, and one school in Southwestern Indiana, who also compete as part of the NJCAA in its Region XXIV (or Region 24). Conference championships are held in most sports and individuals can be named to All-Conference and All-Academic teams. The conference itself is a Division-II organization though some member schools feature teams that compete at the Division-I or Division-III levels.

== Member schools ==
=== Current members ===
The MWAC currently has nine full members, all are public schools:

Institution	Location	Founded	Affiliation	Enrollment	Nickname	Joined
Danville Area Community College	Danville, Illinois	1946	Public (Note: Part of the Illinois Community College System.)	1,924	Jaguars	1990
Heartland Community College	Normal, Illinois	1991	Public	4,774	Hawks	2006
Illinois Central College	East Peoria, Illinois	1967	Public	7,044	Cougars	2005
John Wood Community College	Quincy, Illinois	1992	Public	1,718	Trail Blazers	1998
Lewis & Clark Community College	Godfrey, Illinois	1838	Public	3,973	Trailblazers	1990
Lincoln Land Community College	Springfield, Illinois	1969	Public	4,444	Loggers	1994
Parkland College	Champaign, Illinois	1966	Public	5,686	Cobras	1996
Spoon River College	Canton, Illinois	1959	Public	1,212	Snappers	1990
Vincennes University	Vincennes, Indiana	1801	Public	4,416	Trailblazers	2018

=== Former members ===
The MWAC had one former full member, which was also a private school:

Institution	Location	Founded	Affiliation	Enrollment	Nickname	Joined	Left	Current conference
Lincoln College	Lincoln, Illinois	1865	Nonsectarian	N/A	Lynx	?	2018	N/A (Note: Lincoln (Ill.) ceased operations in 2022.)

== Sports ==
Teams in Mid-West Athletic Conference competition
Sport	Men's	Women's
Baseball	9	—
Basketball	8	8
Golf	6	—
Soccer	5	6
Softball	—	8
Volleyball	—	8

=== Men's sponsored sports by school ===
School	Baseball	Basketball	Golf	Soccer	Total
Danville Area Community College	✓	✓	✓	✗	3
Heartland Community College	✓	✗	✓	✓	3
Illinois Central College	✓	✓	✓	✓	4
John Wood Community College	✓	✓	✗	✓	3
Lewis & Clark Community College	✓	✓	✓	✓	4
Lincoln Land Community College	✓	✓	✗	✗	2
Parkland College	✓	✓	✓	✓	4
Spoon River College	✓	✓	✗	✗	3
Vincennes University	✓	✓	✓	✗	3
Totals	9	8	6	5	28

Men's varsity not sponsored by the Mid-West Athletic Conference that are played by schools
School	Cross Country	E-Sports	Tennis	Bowling	Track and Field
Danville Area Community College	Yes	Yes			
Heartland Community College	Yes	Yes			
John Wood Community College		Yes			
Lewis & Clark Community College			Yes		
Parkland College		Yes			
Spoon River College		Yes			
Vincennes University	Yes	Yes		Yes	Yes

=== Women's sponsored sports by school ===
School	Basketball	Soccer	Softball	Volleyball	Total
Danville Area Community College	✓	✗	✓	✗	2
Heartland Community College	✗	✓	✓	✓	3
Illinois Central College	✓	✓	✓	✓	3
John Wood Community College	✓	✓	✓	✓	4
Lewis & Clark Community College	✓	✓	✓	✓	4
Lincoln Land Community College	✓	✓	✓	✓	4
Parkland College	✓	✓	✓	✓	4
Spoon River College	✓	✗	✓	✓	3
Vincennes University	✓	✗	✗	✓	2
Totals	8	6	8	8	30

Women's varsity not sponsored by the Mid-West Athletic Conference that are played by schools

School	Golf	Cross Country	E-Sports	Tennis	Track and Field
Danville Area Community College	Yes	Yes	Yes		
Heartland Community College		Yes	Yes		
John Wood Community College			Yes		
Lewis & Clark Community College				Yes	
Lincoln Land Community College			Yes		
Spoon River College			Yes		
Vincennes University		Yes	Yes		Yes
