= Western Pennsylvania Athletic Conference =

Junior college athletic conference

- Association: NJCAA
- Founded: 2012
- Sports fielded: 21 (11 men's, 10 women's)
- No. of teams: 9
- Region: Western Pennsylvania – NJCAA Region 20

The Western Pennsylvania Athletic Conference (WPAC) is a junior college conference in the National Junior College Athletic Association (NJCAA) for many technical and community colleges in western Pennsylvania. And it is one of two conferences within the Region 20 of the NJCAA. Conference championships are held in most sports and individuals can be named to All-Conference and All-Academic teams.

== Member schools ==
=== Current members ===
The WPAC currently has nine full members, all but four are public schools:

Institution	Location	Founded	Affiliation	Enrollment	Nickname	Joined
Butler County Community College	Butler Township, Pennsylvania	1965	Public	3,656	Pioneers	2012
Community College of Allegheny County-Allegheny	Pittsburgh, Pennsylvania (Note: Located at Pittsburgh's Allegheny West neighborhood.)	1966	Public	60,000	WildCats	2012
Community College of Allegheny County-Boyce	Monroeville, Pennsylvania	1966	Public	60,000	WildCats	2012
Community College of Allegheny County-North	McCandless, Pennsylvania	1972	Public	60,000	WildCats	2012
Community College of Allegheny County-South	West Mifflin, Pennsylvania	1967	Public	60,000	WildCats	2012
Community College of Beaver County	Center Township, Pennsylvania	1966	Public	6,800	Titans	2012
Pennsylvania Highlands Community College (Penn Highlands)	Johnstown, Pennsylvania	1993	Public	?	Black Bears	2012
Potomac State College	Keyser, West Virginia	1901	Public (Note: Part of the West Virginia University System.)	1,193	Catamounts	2012
Westmoreland County Community College	Youngwood, Pennsylvania	1970	Public	4,800	Wolfpack	2012

== See also ==
- Garden State Athletic Conference
