= Carl Sandburg College =

Community college in Galesburg, Illinois, U.S.

- Type: Public community college
- Established: 1966
- President: Seamus Reilly
- Students: 1,688 (Fall 2022)
- Location: Galesburg, Illinois, U.S. 40°58′54″N 90°24′27″W
- Nickname: Chargers
- Sporting affiliations: NJCAA Division II; Arrowhead Conference
- Website: www.sandburg.edu

Carl Sandburg College is a public community college with its main campus in Galesburg, Illinois. The college serves the west-central Illinois region, has a branch campus in Carthage and an off-campus site in downtown Galesburg.

The college was established in 1966 and is accredited by the Higher Learning Commission. Along with providing associate degree education for students, Sandburg also has over 50 occupational programs and continuing education/adult learning.

== Academics ==
Carl Sandburg College offers 25 associate degrees and 33 certificates.

== Transportation ==
Galesburg Transit provides Carl Sandburg College students and faculty with free public transit within Galesburg. The Red Route connects campus with downtown Galesburg and other destinations.

== See also ==
- Illinois Community College System
- Knox College
