= Southwestern Community College (Iowa) =

Community college in Iowa, U.S.

- Motto: "SWCC is the place for you!"
- Type: Public
- Established: 1966
- President: Lindsay Stoaks
- Students: Approximately 1,500
- Location: Creston, Iowa, United States; 41.071865°N 94.380383°W
- Campus: Rural
- Colors: Red and Navy
- Nickname: Spartans
- Mascot: Spartan
- Website: www.swcciowa.edu

Southwestern Community College (SWCC) is an American public community college with its main campus in Creston, Iowa. It also has centers in Red Oak, Iowa, and Osceola, Iowa. In addition to an arts and sciences program, SWCC offers career and technical education (CTE) degrees and certificates.

== History ==
Southwestern Community College (SWCC) began operation as part of the Iowa community college system in 1966, on a 406-acre (1.64 km^{2}) campus in northwest Creston, Iowa. SWCC is a two-year public institution offering programs for transfer to four-year colleges and universities; career and technical education programs to train students for the workforce; continuing education courses and programs; and industrial training classes. Southwestern inherited the facilities and instructional programs of Creston Community College, which had been operated by the Creston Community School district since 1926.

In 1970, the campus was expanded with construction of a technical center, administrative offices, and a student center.

In 1995 a Wellness Center was built; it included an Olympic sized pool, gymnasium, and performing arts auditorium. The Wellness Center also hosts the Southern Prairie Family Fitness Center and adult and continuing education department. In 2000 another addition to the campus was made, which added an allied health and science center, a second technical center, and the Spartan Suites apartment-style dormitories.

On April 14, 2012, during the tornado outbreak of April 13–16, 2012, an EF2 tornado struck Creston, resulting in considerable damage to the campus.

Each semester, SWCC has an enrollment of approximately 1,500 students.

SWCC won the 2017 NJCAA Men's Division II Basketball Championship, the first national title in Spartan history.

== Board of trustees ==
SWCC is governed by an eight-member board of trustees. They represent eight districts. The board includes Jane Ernst of Greenfield (District 1), Fred Shearer of Corning (District 2), Jerry Smith of Osceola (District 3), Carol Saxton of Leon (District 4), Kevin Britten of Red Oak (District 5), Zach Gunsolley of Diagonal (District 6), TBA (District 7), and Tony Cass of Creston (District 8).
