= Arrowhead Conference =

College athletic conference in the United States

- Association: NJCAA
- Founded: 1970
- Sports fielded: 6; men's: 3; women's: 3
- Division: Region 4
- No. of teams: 6
- Region: Northern Illinois

The Arrowhead Conference is a conference within the National Junior College Athletic Association (NJCAA) located in region 4. The conference consists of six junior colleges located in northern Illinois.

== Member schools ==
=== Current members ===
The Arrowhead (or AAC) currently has six full members, all are public schools:

Institution	Location (Note: All locations are within the State of Illinois.)	Founded	Affiliation	Enrollment	Nickname	Joined
Black Hawk College	Moline	1946	Public (Note: Part of the Illinois Community College System.)	3,773	Braves	1970
Carl Sandburg College	Galesburg	1966	Public	1,688	Chargers	1970
Highland Community College	Freeport	1967	Public	1,861	Cougars	1970
Illinois Valley Community College	Oglesby	1924	Public	2,687	Eagles	1999
Kishwaukee College	Malta	1968	Public	3,842	Kougars	1970
Sauk Valley Community College	Dixon	1965	Public	2,000	Skyhawks	1970

== See also ==
- North Central Community College Conference, also in Region 4
- Illinois Skyway Conference, also in Region 4
