= Illinois Board of Higher Education =

State agency for overseeing post-secondary education in Illinois

The Illinois Board of Higher Education (IBHE) is a state government agency that oversees higher education in the U.S. state of Illinois. The IBHE was created in 1961. Since 2012 the IBHE also permits and oversees business schools and other vocational schools, which were formerly overseen by the Illinois State Board of Education.

The board itself has 16 members:

- 10 members appointed by the Governor, by and with the advice and consent of the Illinois Senate, all of which must be citizens of the state, and one of which must be a faculty member at an Illinois public university
- 1 member from a public university governing board, appointed by the Governor without the advice and consent of the Senate
- 1 member from a private college or university board of trustees, appointed by the governor without the advice and consent of the Senate
- the chairman of the Illinois Community College Board
- the chairman of the Illinois Student Assistance Commission
- 2 student members selected by the recognized advisory committee of students of the Board of Higher Education, one of whom must be a non-traditional undergraduate student who is at least 24 years old and "represents the views of non-traditional students, such as a person who is employed or is a parent"

The chairman of the board is designated by the governor "to serve until a successor is designated". Of the 12 board members appointed by the governor, but excluding the chairman of the board, no more than 7 may be affiliated with the same political party.

== See also ==
- Illinois Community College Board — deals with community colleges in Illinois
- Illinois State Board of Education — deals primarily with childhood education
