= Black Hawk College =

Community college in Moline, Illinois, U.S.

- Former name: Moline Community College
- Type: Public community college
- Established: 1946
- President: Jeremy Thomas
- Students: 3,773 (Fall 2022)
- Location: Moline, Illinois, United States; 41°31′43″N 90°24′39″W
- Additional campuses: Galva, East Moline, Kewanee, Rock Island
- Colors: Black, Gold
- Nickname: Braves
- Sporting affiliations: NJCAA - Arrowhead Conference
- Website: www.bhc.edu

Black Hawk College is a public community college in Illinois with campuses in Moline and Galva.

== History ==
Black Hawk College is a community college with campuses located in Moline and in Kewanee (5 miles (8 km) south of Kewanee). Founded in 1946 as Moline Community College, it became Black Hawk College in 1961. It offers courses in the traditional liberal arts, vocational education, and adult education.

Since Moline Community College was founded in 1946, it was colocated with Moline High School in the Beling Building on 16 Street, Moline. The high school moved to new facilities in 1958. In 1967, the college expanded operations to Kewanee, Illinois, and in 1971, opened the East Campus just south of Kewanee, in Galva, which also houses the agriculture and horticulture programs. The Illinois Community College Board approved the college as one college with two campuses in 1989.

In addition to the full-service campuses in Moline and Galva the college owns the Outreach Center in East Moline, the Adult Learning Center in Rock Island, and the Community Education Center in Kewanee.

== Academics ==
Black Hawk College is accredited by the Higher Learning Commission and approved by the Illinois Community College Board. Specific programs are accredited by the Commission on Accreditation in Physical Therapy Education and the National League for Nursing Accrediting Commission.

Black Hawk College offers college transfer and career programs. The college annually enrolls over 8,300 college credit students, 3,000 Adult Basic Education students and 6,000 Continuing Education/Vocational Training students. It offers dual enrollment to high school students seeking an early start on their college education.

== Athletics ==
Black Hawk College competes in several intercollegiate sports as a member of the National Junior College Athletic Association (NJCAA) and Arrowhead Conference. The sports offered at the Quad-Cities Campus include men's golf, basketball, soccer, and baseball and women's volleyball, soccer, basketball, and softball.

== Transportation ==
The main campus of Black Hawk College in Moline is served by Quad Cities MetroLINK. Routes 30 and 60 provide bus service from campus to downtown Moline, downtown Rock Island, and other destinations.

== Notable alumni ==
- Phil Hare, former U.S. Congressman from Illinois's 17th congressional district.
- Richard Kauzlarich, author and former U.S. intelligence officer and U.S. Ambassador to Azerbaijan and Bosnia–Herzegovina.

== See also ==
- Black Hawk (Sauk leader)
- List of community colleges in Illinois
