= Heartland Community College =

Community college in Normal, Illinois, U.S.

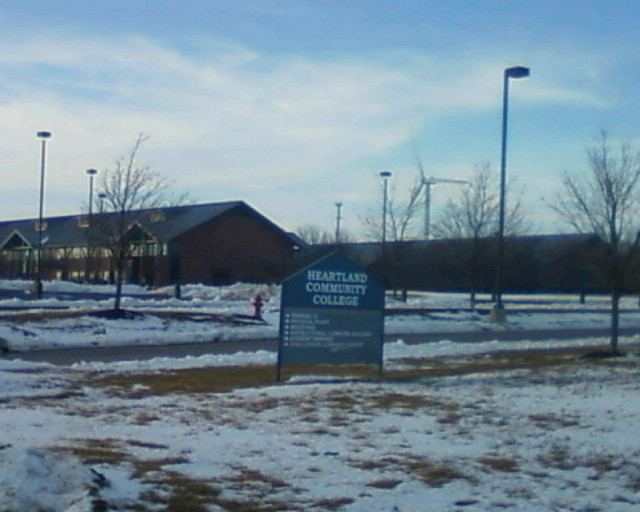
- Heartland Community College in Feb. 2015
- Type: Public community college
- Established: 1990
- President: Keith Cornille
- Students: 4,855 (fall 2024)
- Location: Normal, Illinois, U.S. 40.5345°N 89.0144°W
- Colors: Blue, White, Black
- Nickname: Hawks
- Sporting affiliations: NJCAA; Mid-West Athletic Conference
- Website: www.heartland.edu

Heartland Community College is a public community college with campuses in Normal, Lincoln, and Pontiac, Illinois.

== History ==
The state of Illinois is divided into community college districts. Students desiring to attend a community college in Illinois have a lower tuition rate if they attend the community college for the district in which they live. Prior to 1991, the entire state of Illinois was covered by community college districts except a portion of central Illinois centered on Bloomington. Students living in this non-districted area were in the unique situation of being allowed the choice of attending any of the surrounding four districts' community colleges.

This situation changed in 1990 when Heartland Community College was established, with its first "campus" located in the Landmark Mall in the city of Normal, and a second location opened in Bloomington's Towanda Plaza in 1992. The college moved to its current campus in north Normal in 2000, and closed the last building in the strip mall in 2007.

Heartland's first president was Jonathan Astroth, who served from 1991 to 2010. He was succeeded by Allen Goben and, later, Rob Widmer. Upon Widmer's retirement in 2018, Keith Cornille assumed the mantle.

== Campus ==
Heartland Community College consists currently of seven buildings on the main campus in Normal. Three of the original buildings are connected by walkways on the second floor that cross over Community College Drive. The other four buildings were additions after the initial permanent campus was opened in 2000.

Approaching the campus from the east, the first of the buildings is the CCB, or Community Commons Building. This building is where new students may register for classes, speak to an Academic Advisor, access their student records, and receive other information. This building also houses the Financial Aid department and the Human Resources department. Directly connected to this building by way of the walkway on the second floor is the SCB, or Student Commons Building.

The SCB houses the Campus Café, student bookstore, library, security desk, and IT department. The SCB is also home to Project Rise, Heartland's Student Support Services Trio program. The SCB is aligned perpendicular to the CCB and the third main building, the ICB, or Instructional Commons Building.

The ICB is connected to the north end of the SCB's second floor by a walkway, and is actually twice as long from end to end as either the SCB or CCB, and has an open meeting area in the middle of its length on the first floor. It houses department offices. This is also home to many classrooms.

ICN, or Instructional Commons North, sits between the ICB and the WDC and houses mostly classrooms and a few departmental offices.

WDC, or Workforce Development Center, was the first new addition to the permanent campus. This building was erected in 2007 at the north end of the campus grounds, and opened for classes that fall. It is intended to be a "green" building, with heating and cooling being provided by geothermal energy and other eco-friendly technology. Standing over three stories tall, including the fourth floor maintenance area, it is the tallest building on campus, and is where the vast majority of technology-focused classes are held.

The Astroth Community Education Building, or ACEC, houses many meeting rooms, a campus auditorium seating more than 400, and the Challenger Learning Center (CLC. The Challenger Learning Center is one of several such centers located around the world that use space exploration as a way to teach students valuable STEM skills. The CLC can also be used for team-building.

The Fitness and Recreation Center (FRC) houses an aerobics studio, a gymnasium, a walking/jogging track, locker rooms with showers and towel service and a training room. There are also several classrooms in the building as well as the office for the athletic department.

The Child Development Lab (CDL) is a lab school for children ages six weeks to five years and a facility that provides opportunities for early childhood students needing first-hand experience working with young children.

== Sports ==
Heartland's sports teams are known as the Hawks. The Hawks compete in soccer (men's and women's), baseball, and softball. The Hawks joined the Mid-West Athletic Conference (MWAC) as part of the National Junior College Athletic Association (NJCAA).

Nate Metzger - current associate head baseball coach at Wright State University. Metzger was named the first director of athletics and head baseball coach at Heartland Community College, building the athletic department and baseball program from the ground up (2006–2016). Metzger was a four-time NJCCA Region Coach of the Year assisting 124 of 138 student-athletes continue their baseball and academic careers at four-year universities, with 25 players moving on to professional baseball and 89 going on to Division I programs.

Heartland posted a 414–106 record with a .800 winning percentage and averaged 46 wins per year under Metzger, while being nationally ranked each year and reaching the NJCAA Division II World Series three times, including a third-place finish in 2012 and a fourth-place finish in 2013. The Hawks held a #1 national ranking in 2011, 2012, and 2013.

== Notable Alumni ==
- Sam Antonacci, professional baseball player
