= McHenry County College =

Public community college in Crystal Lake, Illinois, US

Coordinates: 42.25981°N 88.368251°W

- Type: Public community college
- Established: 1967; 59 years ago
- Accreditation: HLC
- President: Clinton Gabbard
- Students: 7,085
- Location: Crystal Lake, Illinois, U.S.
- Campus: Suburban
- Colors: Purple and Gold
- Nickname: MCCScots
- Sporting affiliations: National Junior College Athletic Association (NJCAA) ― ISC, Division I
- Mascot: Roary
- Website: www.mchenry.edu

Former logo of McHenry County College.

McHenry County College (MCC) is a public community college in McHenry County, Illinois. The college serves residents residing in Community College District 528, which covers most of McHenry County and portions of surrounding counties. MCC offers associate degrees programs and certificates.

The college is located along U.S. Route 14, on the northwest side of Crystal Lake, Illinois. The Catalyst Campus is located in Woodstock. The Catalyst Campus is home to five specialized centers of learning including the Career Spark Center, Talent Impact Center, and the University Center. At the University Center at MCC, students can earn select bachelor's and advanced degrees through partnering colleges: Aurora University, Northern Illinois University, Roosevelt University, and Southern Illinois University.

Some classes are also taught at area high schools, public libraries, local businesses, and other off-campus locations. It enrolls about 8,000 students in career programs, transfer programs, GED and adult basic education, non-credit and career development, and training for businesses.

== History ==
MCC was established on April 1, 1967, as part of the Illinois community college system. In September 1968 classes were held for the first time for 312 full-time and 1.045 part-time students at a rented oil company in Crystal Lake. In 1974 construction began on new facilities at its present 68-acre site, known at the time as Weber Farm. The school began some classes at the new facility in September 1975, and the move was complete by May 1976. MCC continued to grow, both in land area and student population.

In 2020, MCC employed approximately 700 full and part-time employees. Nearly 90% of faculty held a master's or doctoral degree.

== Student life ==
MCC has over 30 student-run organizations (e.g., Business Club, Latinos Unidos, Neurodiversity Club, Paranormal Theories, Phi Theta Kappa, Pride, and Student Government). The Silver Cord Award is an award available to students who complete at least 100 hours of community service/volunteering.

== Athletics ==
The MCC Scots compete in 8 intercollegiate sports through their membership in the Illinois Skyway Conference within the National Junior College Athletic Association (NJCAA), Division II. For men, this includes baseball, basketball, soccer and tennis. For women, basketball, softball, tennis, and volleyball. Their mascot is a lion named Roary and their colors are gold and purple.
