= John Wood Community College =

Public college in Quincy, Illinois, US

- Other name: JWCC
- Type: Public community college
- Established: 1974
- Parent institution: Illinois Community College System
- President: Dr. Bryan Renfro
- Undergraduates: 1,718 (Fall 2022)
- Location: Quincy, Illinois, United States; 39°55′47″N 91°20′25″W
- Campus: Rural, 206.32 acres (83.49 ha)
- Colors: Green & gold
- Sporting affiliations: Mid-West Athletic Conference; NCJAA Division II
- Mascot: Woody the Trail Blazer
- Website: www.jwcc.edu

John Wood Community College (JWCC) is a public community college in Quincy, Illinois. It is one of 48, two-year, open-admission colleges of the Illinois Community College System organized under the Illinois Public Community College Act.

== History ==
John Wood Community College was founded in 1974 to provide post-secondary education for residents of Community College District 539. The college is named after John Wood, founder of Quincy and 12th governor of Illinois. JWCC began classes in 1975 with 668 enrolled students. Authorized by the Illinois General Assembly and signed by Illinois Governor Otto Kerner, Jr. in 1961, the legislation enacted created the Illinois Board of Higher Education (IBHE). The IBHE was tasked by statute with formulating a Master Plan for Higher Education in the state of Illinois. In July 1964 the higher education master plan was published by the IBHE, which led to the passage of the Junior College Act of 1965 by the 72nd Illinois General Assembly. However, it was not until 1974 that official steps were taken to form a community college within the district boundaries.

Lacking formal facilities of its own, JWCC utilized a "Common Market" approach. The board of trustees contracted with area colleges such as Culver-Stockton College, Hannibal-LaGrange College, Quincy College, who would enroll students in their courses on behalf of JWCC. This allowed JWCC to begin operations quickly, by utilizing the staff and facilities of other colleges at a time when the college had few facilities of its own and no instructional staff. The first class graduated from JWCC on May 22, 1976, without ever having attended class at a college owned facility.

The college acquired classroom facilities of its own in 1983 when JWCC purchased and renovated the former Lincoln Elementary School at 48th and Maine streets. College programs and services were located in this building until January 2002. The Common Market approach coexisted with campus-based instruction until 1991, when rising costs compelled the JWCC Board of Trustees to end the common market contract with Quincy College. Other contracts were not renewed as they expired.

Due to increasing enrollment, and the phasing out of the Common Market, the college purchased three prefabricated buildings in 1991 to hold classes. By 1996, growth was significant enough that JWCC's board of trustees voted to purchase a 155-acre (0.63 km^{2}) site at 48th and Harrison Streets, in Quincy, Illinois. In 1997, the Board of Trustees adopted its Master Plan for a new campus. The first building, the 35,200 square feet (3,270 m^{2}) Science and Technology Center was built and occupied in January 1998. This was followed by the next buildings in the plan; the Learning Center, a Student & Administrative Center, and a Maintenance Building in January 2002. A $16 million project, the new buildings added nearly 103,000 square feet (9,600 m^{2}) to the size of the college. Funding was split between the college and the State of Illinois. In 2004, the 52,000 square feet (4,800 m^{2}) Paul Heath Community Education and Fine Arts Center was completed. The buildings house JWCC's community education, fine arts and Business and Industry Training offices. In 2006, a Student Activity Center (SAC) was completed, that included an 1,800-seat gymnasium, weight room, classroom, locker rooms, and athletic team training rooms. A baseball field, softball field, and additional parking were built as a part of the SAC project.

== Campus ==
John Wood Community College currently has its main campus in Quincy, Illinois. In addition to its main campus, JWCC has several satellite learning centers around the college district. A second primary learning center for classes, known as the Pittsfield Education Center, was opened in Pittsfield, Illinois for the local residents of Pike County.

In addition to RLC's two credit learning campuses, the college holds both for credit and non-credit classes at several locations. The JWCC Agricultural Education Center, which supports Agricultural majors seeking to transfer to baccalaureate institutions, is located on the University of Illinois Orr Agronomy Research Center in the city of Perry, Illinois. In addition, the college operates the JWCC/Dot Foods Learning Center under a partnership between the company Dot Foods and JWCC. The center serves as both a training facility for Dot Food workers, and for JWCC students in Brown County, Illinois. The college provides the instructors for both Dot Foods and its regular for-credit classes at the center. JWCC also operates an adult learning center in Quincy, Illinois for those working towards completing their GED.

== Academics and demographics ==
John Wood College is accredited by the Higher Learning Commission.

The college takes part in the Illinois Articulation Initiative (IAI), a statewide transfer agreement which ensures general education credits are transferable among more than 100 participating college or universities in Illinois. In addition to the IAI, RLC offers students "two-plus-two" programs that guarantee students that the courses completed at the college will transfer to their majors at four-year baccalaureate institutions. There are two primary divisions at Rend Lake College: the General Education Departments, and the Career and Technical Departments, which encompass six and 14 departments respectively. The departments offer a total of 43 associate degree programs, and 20 certificate programs. The college offers four types of associate degrees: Associate in Arts (AA), Associate in Fine Arts (AFA), Associate in Science (AS), and Associate in Applied Science degree (AAS).

=== Enrollment ===
As of April 13, 2009, Spring enrollment at RLC was 2403, of which 1216 were enrolled full-time, and 1187 were enrolled part-time. In addition, 1241 non-credit enrollees were reported by RLC for the same period. Fiscal year 2009 saw a slight decline in the number of enrolled student, yet saw an increase in the total number of credit hours taken at the college.

=== Libraries ===
John Wood College provides a library within its Learning Resources Center at its main Quincy, Illinois Campus. The library has nearly twenty thousand volumes, alongside online resources and a media learning area. It has facilities for study, research, leisure reading, class preparation, and wireless Internet access for students.

== Leadership ==
Presidents and their years of service are:

- Paul R. Heath (1975-1987)
- Robert Keys (1988-1996)
- William M. Simpson (1997-2008)
- Thomas Klincar (2008-2011)
- John Letts (2012-2014)
- Michael Elbe (2014–2022)
- Bryan Renfro (2023–Present)

== Transportation ==
The main campus of John Wood Community College in Quincy is served by Quincy Transit Lines. The Blue Route provides bus service connecting campus to other destinations around Quincy.

== Notable alumni ==
- Brian McGinnis, Marine Corps veteran, firefighter, and political candidate

== See also ==
- Illinois Community College System
