= Danville Area Community College =

Community college in Danville, Illinois, U.S.

Coordinates: 40.129261°N 87.587883°W

- DACC logo
- Type: Public community college
- Established: 1946
- Accreditation: HLC
- President: Randy Fletcher
- Academic staff: 53 full-time, 99 part-time
- Administrative staff: 123
- Students: 1,924 (fall 2022)
- Location: Danville, Illinois, U.S.
- Campus: 75 acres (300,000 m^{2})
- Colors: Green and gold
- Sporting affiliations: NJCAA; Mid-West Athletic Conference
- Mascot: Jaguars
- Website: www.dacc.edu

Danville Area Community College (DACC) is a public community college in Danville, Illinois. It was founded in 1946 as an extension of the University of Illinois; it has grown into an independent college offering courses in 76 areas of study. These include college transfer, occupational degrees and certificates, re-training, skill development, customized training and areas of special interest. As of the Fall 2022 semester, there were 1924 students enrolled at the college.

== History ==
In 1946, the University of Illinois opened extension centers in several Illinois towns to help meet the educational needs of World War II veterans. In Danville, the center was housed at Danville High School under the direction of Principal R. M. Duffin. The centers were closed in the spring of 1949, and Danville School District 118 decided to continue teaching college classes using the name Danville Community College. Mary Miller, who had headed the DHS English department, led the new college. At that time the tuition rate was $5.00 per credit hour, with a $5.00 student and library fee. In 1951, the name was changed to Danville Junior College.

In 1965, the college moved to buildings provided by the US government which had been part of the Veterans Administration on the southeast side of town; this provided the present-day 75-acre (300,000 m^{2}) campus. Local citizens raised money for the renovation of the buildings.

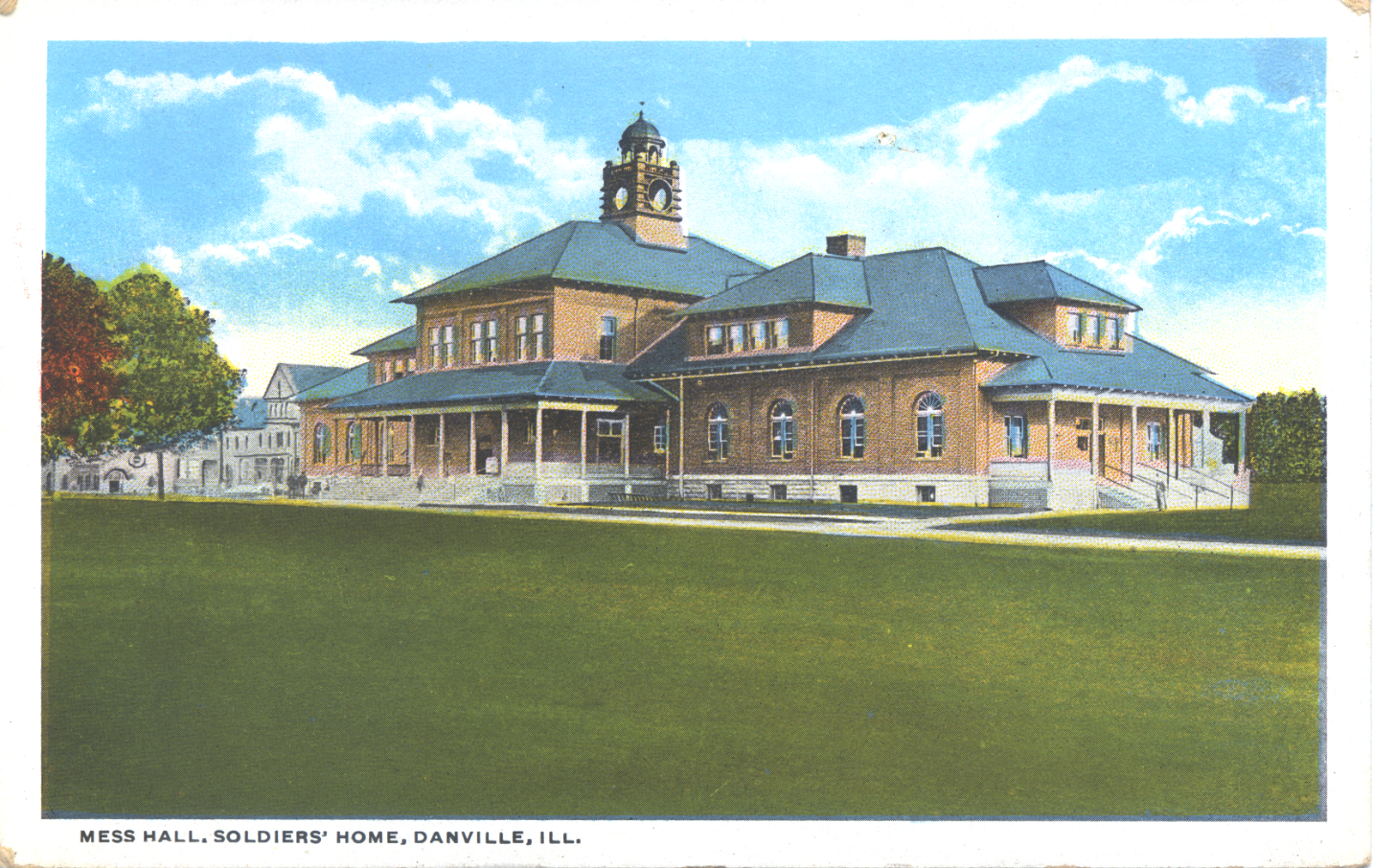
The building which became the Clock Tower Center at DACC

In June 1966, the college separated from District 118 under the provisions of the Public Junior College Act and became an independent two-year area college under the control of the Board of Trustees of Junior College District No. 507. The name Danville Junior College was changed to Danville Area Community College on July 1, 1979.

Since the campus opened in 1965, several new buildings have been added, including the Mary Miller Center (named for the college's first president and housing the gymnasium and the Sciences division), the Ornamental Horticulture building, the Technology Center, the Child Development Center, and Lincoln Hall. In addition, several of the existing buildings dating from the late 1890s have been renovated, including the Clock Tower Center, Vermilion Hall, Cannon Hall, and Prairie Hall. The Bremer Center was expanded in 2007 and the Mary Miller Complex was expanded in 2012.

In 2002, DACC opened the Downtown Center in the heart of downtown Danville in order to facilitate the growing demand for career-preparatory classes. In 2006 the Downtown Center moved to the Job Training Partnership facility at 407 North Franklin Street.

DACC has hosted the NJCAA Men's Division II Basketball Championship since 1994. This takes place in the Mary Miller Center Gymnasium.

In September 2024, DACC president Stephen Nacco was suspended by the board of trustees pending possible firing. The following month, Nacco resigned, effective December 2024. Nacco later announced he was running to be on the board of trustees that previously voted to fire him but he was disqualified from running due to many issues with invalid signatures and non-existent voters.

=== Presidents ===
- Mary Miller, 1946–1972
- William Langas, 1972–1979
- Joseph Borgen, 1979–1980
- Ronald Lingle, 1980–1989
- Harry Braun, 1989–1999
- Alice Jacobs, 1999–2016
- Stephen Nacco, 2016–2024
- Randy Fletcher, 2024–present

== Service area ==
Community College District No. 507 encompasses most of Vermilion County, Illinois, along with portions of Edgar, Iroquois, Champaign and Ford counties.
