= Prairie State College =

Community college in Chicago Heights, Illinois, US

- Motto: Start near. Go far.
- Type: Community college
- Established: 1958; 68 years ago
- Endowment: 8.2 million
- President: Michael D. Anthony
- Faculty: 80 Full-time and 126 Part-time (Spring 2022)
- Students: 2,618 (all undergraduate)
- Location: Chicago Heights, Illinois, United States; 41.528°N 87.638°W
- Campus: 123 acres (49.8 ha), Suburban
- Nickname: Pioneers
- Website: prairiestate.edu

Prairie State College is a public community college in Chicago Heights, Illinois. It is the only college operated by Illinois Community College District 515.

== History ==
Founded in 1957 as Bloom Township Junior College, Prairie State College's (PSC) first classes were held in 1958 in the basement of the First Christian Church. Originally established to offer only transfer liberal arts courses and occupational-technical courses, The college was reorganized in 1967 as a Class I junior college. With the combining of four high school districts into an enlarged territory, Bloom Township Junior College was renamed Prairie State College. In 1989, the Beecher Community High School district was added to District 515 by the Illinois Community College Board. In 1968, PSC was housed in 10 interim buildings on its campus at Halsted Street and Vollmer Road. Construction of permanent facilities began in the fall of 1972 and was completed for the 1975–76 academic year. A vocational-technical addition to the main campus building, housing classrooms and laboratories, was dedicated in August 1979. A new Library, the Christopher Art Gallery, and the Community Instructional Center (later renamed the Business & Community Education Center and now known as the Conference Center) opened in 1996. In 1998, the Matteson Area Center opened as a convenient off-campus location to accommodate district residents. In 2025 this became the Fire Science Program building with plans to build a burn tower on adjacent property. The Health/Tech Center, home to the Dental Hygiene, Surgical Technology, and Networking programs, opened in 2000. The Fitness Complex, a unique partnership among PSC, the Chicago Heights Park District and St. James Hospital and Health Centers, opened in 2001. In May 2002, ground was broken for the Adult Training and Outreach Center and Children's Learning Center. The Adult Training and Outreach Center is one of only such buildings in the country dedicated to adult education.

== Accreditations ==
PSC is one of the 39 community college districts (comprising 48 colleges) in Illinois. PSC is accredited by The Higher Learning Commission and a member of the North Central Association (ncahlc.org, 312-263-0456). It is recognized by the Illinois Community College Board and is approved by the State Approval Agency for Veterans Education, Illinois Department of Veteran Affairs.

Additionally, the following programs are accredited by the agency listed:

- Dental Hygiene ~ American Dental Association, Commission on Dental Accreditation
- Surgical Technology ~ Commission on Accreditation of Allied Health Education Programs
- Automotive Technology ~ National Automotive Technical Education Foundation
- Nursing ~ National League for Nursing Accrediting Commission, (NLNAC)

PSC is affiliated with the following:

- American Association of Community Colleges
- Illinois Skyway Collegiate Conference (athletics, music, art, College Bowl, writing)
- National Junior College Athletic Association

== Campus ==
PSC has grown in many ways–in size, in facilities, in breadth and depth of educational options, and in reputation.

The 137-acre campus is located at South Halsted Street and Vollmer Road in Chicago Heights, Illinois. The main campus, located south of Vollmer Road, houses administrative offices, classrooms, laboratories, and student services facilities, including the bookstore, the Counseling and Academic Advising Center, the Student Success Center, Enrollment Services, and the Business Office. The main campus also is home to the Conference Center, a place for special events, meetings, conferences, and the site of the Christopher Art Gallery. The Adult Training and Outreach Center, where the college's English as a Second Language, Adult Basic Education, and GED classes are held, and the Illinois Employment Training Center are also located on the main campus.

PSC's north campus facilities, to the north of Vollmer Road, include the Health/Tech Center and the Fitness Complex, a unique partnership among Prairie State College, the Chicago Heights Park District, and St. James Hospital and Health Centers.

=== District area ===
Illinois Community College District 515, includes parts of Cook and Will counties, and consists of the following communities: Beecher, Chicago Heights, Crete, Flossmoor, Ford Heights, Glenwood, Homewood, Matteson, Monee, Olympia Fields, Park Forest, Richton Park, Sauk Village, South Chicago Heights, Steger, University Park, portions of Country Club Hills, Hazel Crest, Lynwood, Tinley Park and adjacent unincorporated areas of Cook and Will counties.

== Academics ==
PSC offers 95 degrees and certificates. Student body includes nearly 12,010 students enrolled in credit- and non-credit courses, of which 60% are female and 40% male. 45.3% students are part-time and 54.7% are full-time, with an average student age: 28 credit, 46 non-credit.

=== Faculty ===
- Full-time faculty: 87
- 90% of full-time faculty have a master's or doctorate degree
- Student-Faculty ratio: 17:1

=== Transfer majors ===
PSC offers associate degrees to prepare students for transfer to four-year colleges and universities. PSC was the first college in Illinois to guarantee that credits will transfer to other colleges and universities, an assurance that has grown throughout the Illinois Articulation Initiative (IAI).
