= Sauk Valley Community College =

Public college in Dixon, Illinois, US

Coordinates: 41°49′3.0″N 89°35′52.6″W

- Motto: Sauk Makes It Possible...You Make It Happen!
- Established: 1965
- President: Jon Mandrell
- Location: Palmyra Township, Illinois, United States
- Nickname: Skyhawks
- Mascot: Sammy Skyhawk
- Website: www.svcc.edu

Sauk Valley Community College (SVCC) is a public community college in Palmyra Township, Illinois, United States, with a Dixon post office address. It was established in 1965 and was built on the Rock River between the cities of Sterling and Dixon.

The college offers an assortment of transfer degree majors (e.g., A.A., A.S.), career-technical degrees (A.A.S.) and certificates. It enrolls about 2,000 full and part-time students each semester. Sauk provides numerous opportunities for educational growth including programs in adult education (G.E.D. or E.S.L) and classes in personal and professional enrichment. Sauk's district includes portions of Bureau, Lee, Henry, Carroll, Ogle, and Whiteside counties.

It is accredited by the Higher Learning Commission. The Radiation Technology program is accredited by the Joint Review Committee on Education in Radiologic Technology.

== Academics ==
The college offers:

- Associate in Science
- Associate in Arts
- Associate in Engineering Science
- Associate in Liberal Studies
- Associate in Applied Science
- Certificates in career-technical fields

== Athletics ==
Sauk is a member of the Arrowhead Conference and participates in the highest level of National Junior College Athletic Association (NJCAA) competition.

- Men's basketball
- Women's basketball
- Baseball
- Softball
- Cross-country
- Women's tennis
- Men's tennis
- Volleyball
- Golf
- Track
