= Morton College =

Community college in Cicero, Illinois, USA

Coordinates: 41°49′26.4″N 87°45′45.5″W

- Type: Public, community college
- Established: 1924; 102 years ago
- President: Keith McLaughlin
- Students: 3,850 (all undergraduate)(Spring 2022)
- Location: Cicero, Illinois, United States
- Website: www.morton.edu

Morton College is a public community college in Cicero, Illinois. It is the second-oldest community college in the state only after Joliet Junior College. While the campus itself was constructed in 1975, the college was established in 1924. Before the construction of the campus, the college was housed in the same building as the local high school and was Morton Junior College. It is named after Julius Sterling Morton, a Nebraska newspaper editor and politician who served as President Grover Cleveland's Secretary of Agriculture.

Land was acquired for an athletics field in 1994. Intercollegiate athletics for men include baseball, basketball, soccer, and cross country. Women's sports include volleyball, basketball, cross country, soccer and softball.

The college is a National Alternative Fuels Training Consortium training center. It also operates a low-power FM station, WZQC-LP, at 99.1 MHz.
