= National Junior College Athletic Association =

US athletic governing association

- Abbreviation: NJCAA
- Formation: May 14, 1938; 88 years ago (as "Intercollegiate Athletic Association")
- Legal status: Association
- Headquarters: Charlotte, North Carolina, U.S.
- Region served: United States
- Members: 525 schools in 24 regions
- Official language: English
- Executive Director: Christopher Parker
- Main organ: Board of Regents
- Website: njcaa.org

The National Junior College Athletic Association (NJCAA) is the governing association of community college, state college, and junior college athletics throughout the United States. Currently, the NJCAA holds 24 separate regions across 24 states, and it is divided into three divisions.

== History ==
The idea for the NJCAA was conceived in 1937, in Fresno, California. A handful of junior college representatives met to organize an association that would promote and supervise a national program of junior college sports and activities consistent with the educational objectives of junior colleges.

A constitution was presented and adopted at the charter meeting in Fresno on May 14, 1938.

In 1949, the NJCAA was reorganized by dividing the nation into sixteen regions. The officers of the association were the president, vice president, secretary, treasurer, public relations director, and the sixteen regional vice presidents. Although the NJCAA was founded in California, it no longer operates there, having been supplanted by the unaffiliated California Community College Athletic Association.

The NJCAA only allowed male competitors until 1975, when it established a women's division following the enactment of Title IX.

Based out of Hutchinson, Kansas since 1968, the national office relocated to Colorado Springs, Colorado, in 1985. Headquarters moved to Charlotte, North Carolina, in 2018.

=== Division history ===
Each institution belonging to the NJCAA chooses to compete on the Division I, II or III level. Division I colleges may offer full athletic scholarships, totaling a maximum of tuition, fees, room and board, course-related books, up to $250 in course-required supplies, and transportation costs one time per academic year to and from the college by direct route. Division II colleges are limited to awarding tuition, fees, course related books, and up to $250 in course required supplies. Division III institutions may provide no athletically related financial assistance. However, NJCAA colleges that do not offer athletic aid may choose to participate at the Division I or II level if they so desire.

Years	Division
1938–1945	None
1945–1986	Division I
1986–1991	Division I, Division II
1991–	Division I, Division II, Division III

== Awards ==
- Academic Student-Athlete Awards by sport
- "NJCAA Academic Team of the Year" by sport
- "Betty Jo Graber Female Student-Athlete of the Year" by sport
- "David Rowlands Male Student-Athlete of the Year" by sport
- "Lea Plarski Award" by sport
- NJCAA sponsors by sport
- Service Awards by sport

== Halls of fame ==
- NJCAA Hall of Fame
- NJCAA Hall of Fame (Region XVI)
- NJCAA Baseball Coaches Association Hall of Fame
- NJCAA Basketball Hall of Fame
- NJCAA Men's Basketball Coaches Association Hall of Fame
- NJCAA Women's Basketball Hall of Fame
- NJCAA Football Coaches Association Hall of Fame
- NJCAA Wrestling Coaches Association Hall of Fame

== Conferences and regions ==
The NJCAA is divided into 24 different regions:

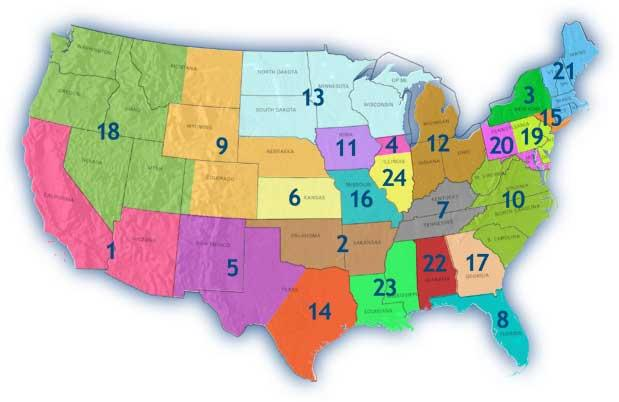
Current NJCAA map of regions.

- Region 1: Arizona Community College Athletic Conference
- Region 2: Bi-State Conference
- Region 3: Mid-State Athletic Conference, Mountain Valley Athletic Conference, Western New York Athletic Conference
- Region 4: North Central Community College Conference, Illinois Skyway Conference, Arrowhead Conference, City College of Chicago Athletic Conference
- Region 5: Metro Athletic Conference, North Texas Junior College Athletic Conference, Western Junior College Athletic Conference
- Region 6: Kansas Jayhawk Community College Conference
- Region 7: Tennessee Junior and Community College Athletic Association
- Region 8: Mid-Florida Conference, Panhandle Conference, Southern Conference, Suncoast Conference
- Region 9: Colorado Community College Athletic Conference, Nebraska Community College Athletic Conference, Wyoming Community College Athletic Conference
- Region 10: Carolinas Junior College Conference
- Region 11: Iowa Community College Athletic Conference
- Region 12: Michigan Community College Athletic Association, Ohio Community College Athletic Conference
- Region 13: Minnesota College Athletic Conference, Mon-Dak Conference
- Region 14: Southwest Junior College Conference
- Region 15: City University of New York Athletic Conference, Mid Hudson Conference
- Region 16: Missouri Community College Athletic Conference
- Region 17: Georgia Collegiate Athletic Association
- Region 18: Scenic West Athletic Conference
- Region 19: Eastern Pennsylvania Athletic Conference, Garden State Athletic Conference
- Region 20: Western Pennsylvania Athletic Conference, Maryland Junior College Athletic Conference
- Region 21: Massachusetts Community College Athletic Association
- Region 22: Alabama Community College Conference
- Region 23: Louisiana Community Colleges Athletic Conference, Mississippi Association of Community & Junior Colleges
- Region 24: Mid-West Athletic Conference, Great Rivers Athletic Conference.

== Sports ==
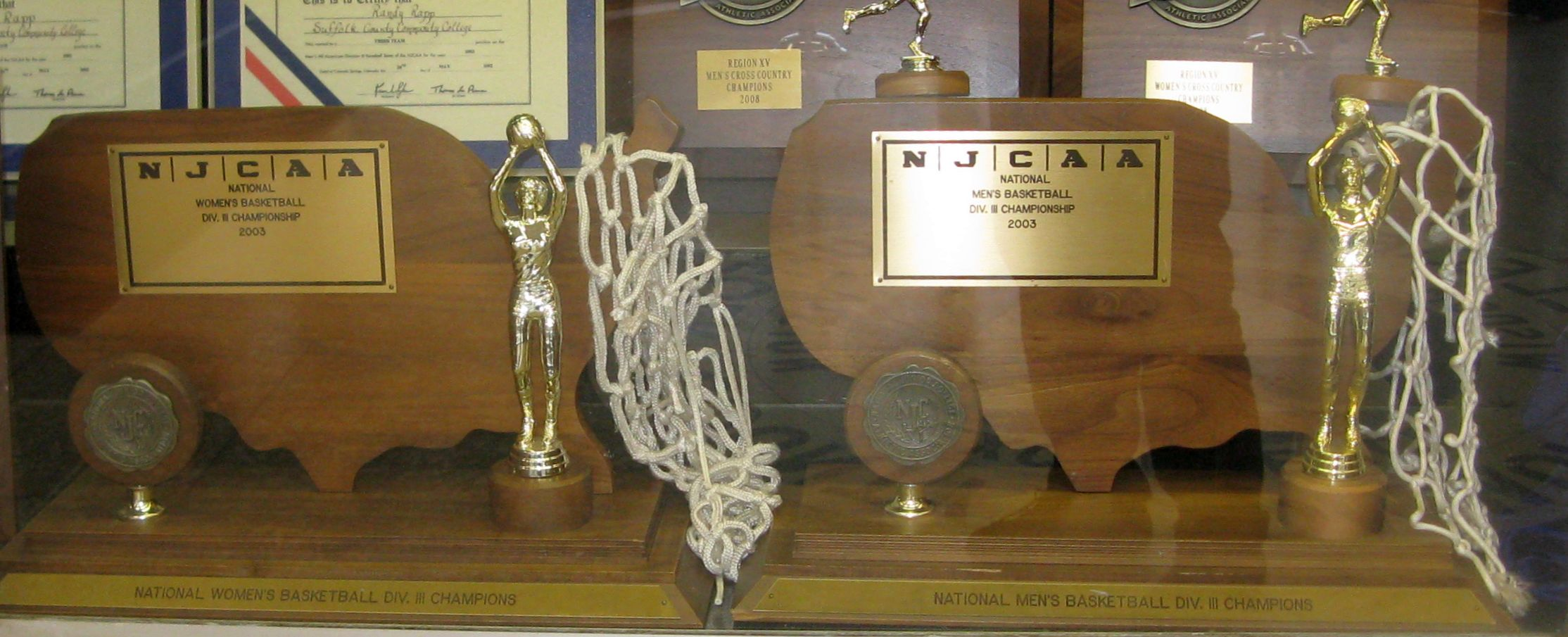
Men's and women's Division III basketball championship trophies from 2003 at Suffolk County Community College

- Baseball (men) (Divisions I, II, III) / Softball (women) (Divisions I, II, III)
- Basketball (Divisions I, II, III)
- Volleyball (Divisions I, II, III)
- Soccer (Divisions I, II)
- Track and field (Divisions I, II)
- Tennis (Divisions I, II)
- Wrestling
- Golf (Divisions I, II, III)
- Cross country (Divisions I, II)
- Football (men) (Division I, III) / Flag football (women)
- Bowling (Division I)
- Swimming (Division I)
- Diving (Division I)
- Lacrosse (men) (Division I)
- Half marathon (Division I)
- Beach volleyball (women)

=== Baseball ===
- JUCO World Series
- JUCO Baseball Coaches Hall of Fame

=== Basketball championships ===
- NJCAA Division I
- NJCAA Division II
- NJCAA Division III
- NJCAA Women's Championship

=== Football ===
Due to the relatively small number of schools fielding teams, some football-only conferences exist. They may be home to teams from multiple regions.

- The Kansas Jayhawk Community College Conference includes only schools in Kansas (Region 6). All are members of the conference in other sports.
- The Midwest Football Conference which features schools from Iowa (Region 11), once included programs in northern Illinois (Region 4), Michigan (part of Region 12), and North Dakota (part of Region 13) before several of its schools dropped football prior to the 2015 season. The three Iowa schools (Ellsworth, Iowa Central and Iowa Western) play each other and also have a scheduling alliance with the KJCCC. The College of DuPage (Region 4), the only Illinois school that still has football, plays as an independent. Harper, Joliet and Grand Rapids all disbanded their football programs. North Dakota State School of Science joined the MCAC (see below).
- The Minnesota College Athletic Conference, includes schools in Minnesota and North Dakota (part of Region 13). All of the Minnesota schools participate in the conference in other sports. North Dakota State School of Science and Dakota College only participate in football.
- The Mississippi Association of Community & Junior Colleges only includes schools in that state, which is a part of Region 23. None of the Louisiana members of Region 23 field a football team.
- The Northeast Football Conference includes schools from regions 15 (Lower New York, New York City and Long Island), and 19 (Lackawanna, Pa.). Lackawanna is the only football-playing school in Region 19.
- The Southwest Junior College Football Conference includes teams from both regions in Texas (5 and 14), Northeastern Oklahoma A&M (Region 2) and New Mexico Military (Region 5).
- Western States Football League, now defunct, once included teams from Arizona (Region 1) and Utah and Idaho (Region 18). Snow College, Utah, is now the only college sponsoring football in Region 1 and Region 18.

There are also independent schools in regions 2 (Arkansas Baptist), 3 (upstate New York), 8 (ASA-Miami), 10 (Louisburg, N.C.), 12 (Hocking College), and 17 (Georgia Military). Onondaga Community College's football program does not compete in the NJCAA but instead competes at the club football level.

Regions 7, 9, 16, 20, 21, 22 and 24 do not have any football programs.

== See also ==
- List of NJCAA Division I schools
- List of NJCAA Division II schools
- List of NJCAA Division III schools
