= List of college athletic programs in New York =

Full NCAA Division I member colleges in New York.

This is a list of college athletic programs in the U.S. state of New York, organized by association and division.

== NCAA ==
=== Division I ===
Team	School	City	Conference	Sport sponsorship								
Team	School	City	Conference	Football	Basketball		Baseball	Softball	Ice hockey		Soccer	
Team	School	City	Conference	Football	M	W	Baseball	Softball	M	W	M	W
Albany Great Danes	State University of New York at Albany	Albany	America East	FCS (Note: Albany and Stony Brook's football teams both compete in CAA Football, a technically separate entity operated by the all-sports CAA.)	Yes	Yes	Yes	Yes	No	No	Yes	Yes
Army Black Knights	United States Military Academy	West Point	Patriot	FBS (Note: Army's football team competes in the American Athletic Conference as an affiliate for football.) (Note: In addition to their D-I football teams, Army and Cornell field teams in sprint football, a weight-restricted form of the sport not governed by the NCAA, as members of the Collegiate Sprint Football League.)	Yes	Yes	Yes	Yes	Yes (Note: Army, Canisius, and Niagara's men's ice hockey teams all compete in Atlantic Hockey America.)	No	Yes	Yes
Binghamton Bearcats	State University of New York at Binghamton	Vestal	America East	No	Yes	Yes	Yes	Yes	No	No	Yes	Yes
Buffalo Bulls	State University of New York at Buffalo	Buffalo	MAC	FBS	Yes	Yes	No	Yes	No	No	No	Yes
Canisius Golden Griffins	Canisius University	Buffalo	Metro	No	Yes	Yes	Yes	Yes	Yes	No	Yes	Yes
Colgate Raiders	Colgate University	Hamilton	Patriot	FCS	Yes	Yes	No	Yes	Yes (Note: Colgate and Cornell's ice hockey teams all compete in ECAC Hockey.)	Yes	Yes	Yes
Columbia Lions	Columbia University	New York City (Manhattan)	Ivy	FCS	Yes	Yes	Yes	Yes	No	No	Yes	Yes
Cornell Big Red	Cornell University	Ithaca	Ivy	FCS	Yes	Yes	Yes	Yes	Yes	Yes	Yes	Yes
Fordham Rams	Fordham University	New York City (The Bronx)	Atlantic 10	FCS (Note: Fordham's football team competes in the Patriot League.)	Yes	Yes	Yes	Yes	No	No	Yes	Yes
Hofstra Pride	Hofstra University	Hempstead	CAA	No	Yes	Yes	Yes	Yes	No	No	Yes	Yes
Iona Gaels	Iona University	New Rochelle	Metro	No	Yes	Yes	Yes	Yes	No	No	Yes	Yes
Le Moyne Dolphins	Le Moyne College	Syracuse	Northeast	No	Yes	Yes	Yes	Yes	No	No	Yes	Yes
LIU Sharks	Long Island University	New York City (Brooklyn) and Brookville	Northeast	FCS	Yes	Yes	Yes	Yes	Yes (Note: LIU's men's ice hockey team competes as an independent, but participates in a scheduling agreement with Atlantic Hockey America.)	Yes (Note: LIU's women's ice hockey team competes in the New England Women's Hockey Alliance.)	Yes	Yes
Manhattan Jaspers and Lady Jaspers	Manhattan University	New York City (The Bronx)	Metro	No	Yes	Yes	Yes	Yes	No	No	Yes	Yes
Marist Red Foxes	Marist University	Poughkeepsie	Metro	FCS (Note: Marist's football team competes in the Pioneer Football League.)	Yes	Yes	Yes	Yes	No	No	Yes	Yes
Niagara Purple Eagles	Niagara University	Lewiston	Metro	No	Yes	Yes	Yes	Yes	Yes	No	Yes	Yes
St. Bonaventure Bonnies	St. Bonaventure University	Olean	Atlantic 10	No	Yes	Yes	Yes	Yes	No	No	Yes	Yes
St. John's Red Storm	St. John's University	New York City (Queens)	Big East	No	Yes	Yes	Yes	Yes	No	No	Yes	Yes
Siena Saints	Siena University	Loudonville	Metro	No	Yes	Yes	Yes	Yes	No	No	Yes	Yes
Stony Brook Seawolves	Stony Brook University	Stony Brook	CAA	FCS	Yes	Yes	Yes	Yes	No	No	Yes	Yes
Syracuse Orange	Syracuse University	Syracuse	ACC	FBS	Yes	Yes	No	Yes	No	Yes (Note: Syracuse's women's ice hockey team competes in Atlantic Hockey America.)	Yes	Yes
Wagner Seahawks	Wagner College	New York City (Staten Island)	Northeast	FCS	Yes	Yes	Yes	Yes	No	No	No	Yes

=== Division II ===
Team	School	City	Conference	Sport sponsorship						
Team	School	City	Conference	Football	Basketball		Baseball	Softball	Soccer	
Team	School	City	Conference	Football	M	W	Baseball	Softball	M	W
Adelphi Panthers	Adelphi University	Garden City	Northeast-10	No	Yes	Yes	Yes	Yes	Yes	Yes
Daemen Wildcats	Daemen University	Amherst	East Coast	No	Yes	Yes	No	No	Yes	Yes
Dominican Chargers	Dominican University New York	Orangeburg	Central Atlantic	No	Yes	Yes	Yes	Yes	Yes	Yes
D'Youville Saints	D'Youville University	Buffalo	East Coast	(Note: St. Thomas Aquinas, Molloy, and D'Youville compete in sprint football, a weight-restricted form of the sport not governed by the NCAA, as a member of the Collegiate Sprint Football League; NYIT will join in 2027.)	Yes	Yes	Yes	Yes	Yes	Yes
Mercy Mavericks	Mercy University	Dobbs Ferry	East Coast	No	Yes	Yes	Yes	Yes	Yes	Yes
Molloy Lions	Molloy University	Rockville Centre	East Coast	Maybe	Yes	Yes	Yes	Yes	Yes	Yes
NYIT Bears	New York Institute of Technology	Old Westbury	Independent (Note: NYIT suspended all athletic programs in the wake of the COVID-19 pandemic; it was formerly a member of the East Coast Conference and will return to competition fielding a sprint football team in 2027.)	Maybe	No	No	No	No	No	No
Pace Setters	Pace University	Pleasantville	Northeast-10	Yes	Yes	Yes	Yes	Yes	Yes	Yes
Queens Knights	Queens College	New York City (Queens)	East Coast	No	Yes	Yes	Yes	Yes	Yes	Yes
Roberts Wesleyan Redhawks	Roberts Wesleyan University	Rochester	East Coast	No	Yes	Yes	No	No	Yes	Yes
St. Thomas Aquinas Spartans	St. Thomas Aquinas College	Sparkill	East Coast	Maybe	Yes	Yes	Yes	Yes	Yes	Yes
Staten Island Dolphins	College of Staten Island	New York City (Staten Island)	East Coast	No	Yes	Yes	Yes	Yes	Yes	Yes

=== Division III ===
Team	School	City	Conference	Sport sponsorship								
Team	School	City	Conference	Football	Basketball		Baseball	Softball	Ice hockey		Soccer	
Team	School	City	Conference	Football	M	W	Baseball	Softball	M	W	M	W
Alfred Saxons	Alfred University	Alfred	Empire 8	Yes	Yes	Yes	Yes	Yes	No	No	Yes	Yes
Alfred State Pioneers	Alfred State College	Alfred	SUNYAC	Yes (Note: Alfred State's football team competes in the Empire 8.)	Yes	Yes	Yes	Yes	No	No	Yes	Yes
Bard Raptors	Bard College	Annandale-on-Hudson	Liberty	No	Yes	Yes	Yes	No	No	No	Yes	Yes
Baruch Bearcats	Baruch College	New York City (Manhattan)	CUNYAC	No	Yes	Yes	Yes	Yes	No	No	Yes	Yes
Brockport Golden Eagles	State University of New York at Brockport	Brockport	Empire 8	Yes	Yes	Yes	Yes	Yes	Yes	No	Yes	Yes
Brooklyn Bulldogs	Brooklyn College	New York City (Brooklyn)	CUNYAC	No	Yes	Yes	No	Yes	No	No	Yes	Yes
Buffalo State Bengals	Buffalo State University	Buffalo	SUNYAC	Yes (Note: Buffalo State's football team competes in the Liberty League.)	Yes	Yes	No	Yes	Yes	Yes (Note: Buffalo State, Cortland, Oswego State, Plattsburgh State, and Potsdam's women's ice hockey teams compete in the Northeast Women's Hockey League.)	Yes	Yes
CCNY Beavers	City College of New York	New York City (Manhattan)	CUNYAC	No	Yes	Yes	Yes	No	No	No	Yes	No
Clarkson Golden Knights	Clarkson University	Potsdam	Liberty	No	Yes	Yes	Yes	Yes	Yes (Note: Clarkson, RPI, St. Lawrence, and Union's ice hockey teams all compete in Division I as members of ECAC Hockey.)	Yes	Yes	Yes
Cortland Red Dragons	State University of New York at Cortland	Cortland	SUNYAC	Yes (Note: Cortland and Morrisville State's football teams compete in the Empire 8.)	Yes	Yes	Yes	Yes	Yes	Yes	Yes	Yes
Elmira Soaring Eagles	Elmira College	Elmira	Empire 8	No	Yes	Yes	Yes	Yes	Yes (Note: Elmira, Manhattanville, Nazareth, and Utica's men's and women's ice hockey teams, as well as William Smith's women's ice hockey team, all compete in the United Collegiate Hockey Conference.)	Yes	Yes	Yes
Farmingdale State Rams	State University of New York at Farmingdale	Farmingdale	Skyline	No	Yes	Yes	Yes	Yes	No	No	Yes	Yes
Fredonia Blue Devils	State University of New York at Fredonia	Fredonia	SUNYAC	No	Yes	Yes	Yes	Yes	Yes	No	Yes	Yes
Geneseo Knights	State University of New York at Geneseo	Geneseo	SUNYAC	No	Yes	Yes	No	Yes	Yes	No	Yes	Yes
Hamilton Continentals	Hamilton College	Clinton	NESCAC	Yes	Yes	Yes	Yes	Yes	Yes	Yes	Yes	Yes
Hartwick Hawks	Hartwick College	Oneonta	Empire 8	Yes	Yes	Yes	No	Yes	No	No	Yes	Yes
Hilbert Hawks	Hilbert College	Hamburg	Allegheny Mountain	Yes (Note: Hilbert's football team competes in the Empire 8.)	Yes	Yes	Yes	Yes	No	No	Yes	Yes
Hobart Statesmen	Hobart College	Geneva	Liberty	Yes	Yes	No	Yes	No	Yes (Note: Hobart and Skidmore's men's ice hockey teams compete in the New England Hockey Conference.)	No	Yes	No
Houghton Highlanders	Houghton University	Houghton	Empire 8	No	Yes	Yes	Yes	Yes	No	No	Yes	Yes
Hunter Hawks	Hunter College	New York City (Manhattan)	CUNYAC	No	Yes	Yes	No	Yes	No	No	Yes	Yes
Ithaca Bombers	Ithaca College	Ithaca	Liberty	Yes	Yes	Yes	Yes	Yes	No	No	Yes	Yes
John Jay Bloodhounds	John Jay College of Criminal Justice	New York City (Manhattan)	CUNYAC	No	Yes	Yes	Yes	Yes	No	No	Yes	Yes
Keuka Wolves	Keuka College	Keuka Park	Empire 8	No	Yes	Yes	Yes	Yes	No	No	Yes	Yes
Lehman Lightning	Lehman College	New York City (The Bronx)	CUNYAC	No	Yes	Yes	Yes	Yes	No	No	Yes	Yes
Manhattanville Valiants	Manhattanville University	Purchase	Skyline	No	Yes	Yes	Yes	Yes	Yes	Yes	Yes	Yes
Medgar Evers Cougars	Medgar Evers College	New York City (Brooklyn)	CUNYAC	No	Yes	Yes	No	No	No	No	Yes	No
Merchant Marine Mariners	United States Merchant Marine Academy	Kings Point	Skyline	Yes (Note: Merchant Marine and SUNY Maritime's football teams compete in the New England Women's and Men's Athletic Conference.)	Yes	Yes	Yes	No	No	No	Yes	Yes
Morrisville State Mustangs	State University of New York at Morrisville	Morrisville	SUNYAC	Yes	Yes	Yes	No	Yes	Yes	Yes (Note: Morrisville State and SUNY Canton's women's ice hockey teams compete in the Northeast Women's Hockey League.)	Yes	Yes
Mount Saint Mary Knights	Mount Saint Mary College	Newburgh	Skyline	No	Yes	Yes	Yes	Yes	No	No	Yes	Yes
Mount Saint Vincent Dolphins	University of Mount Saint Vincent	Riverdale	Skyline	No	Yes	Yes	Yes	Yes	No	No	Yes	Yes
Nazareth Golden Flyers	Nazareth University	Rochester	Empire 8	No	Yes	Yes	No	Yes	Yes	Yes	Yes	Yes
New Paltz Hawks	State University of New York at New Paltz	New Paltz	NJAC	No	Yes	Yes	Yes	Yes	No	No	Yes	Yes
NYU Violets	New York University	New York City (Manhattan)	UAA	No	Yes	Yes	Yes	Yes	No	No	Yes	Yes
Old Westbury Panthers	State University of New York at Old Westbury	Old Westbury	Skyline	No	Yes	Yes	Yes	Yes	No	No	Yes	Yes
Oneonta Red Dragons	State University of New York at Oneonta	Oneonta	SUNYAC	No	Yes	Yes	Yes	Yes	No	No	Yes	Yes
Oswego State Lakers	State University of New York at Oswego	Oswego	SUNYAC	No	Yes	Yes	Yes	Yes	Yes	Yes	Yes	Yes
Plattsburgh State Cardinals	State University of New York at Plattsburgh	Plattsburgh	SUNYAC	No	Yes	Yes	Yes	Yes	Yes	Yes	Yes	Yes
Potsdam Bears	State University of New York at Potsdam	Potsdam	SUNYAC	No	Yes	Yes	No	Yes	Yes	Yes	Yes	Yes
Pratt Cannoneers	Pratt Institute	New York City (Brooklyn)	Atlantic East	No	Yes	Yes	No	No	No	No	Yes	Yes
Purchase Panthers	State University of New York at Purchase	Purchase	Skyline	No	Yes	Yes	Yes	Yes	No	No	Yes	Yes
RIT Tigers	Rochester Institute of Technology	Rochester	Liberty	No	Yes	Yes	Yes	Yes	Yes (Note: RIT's men's ice hockey team competes in Division I as a member of Atlantic Hockey America.)	Yes (Note: RIT's women's ice hockey team competes in Division I as a member of College Hockey America.)	Yes	Yes
Rochester Yellowjackets	University of Rochester	Rochester	UAA	Yes (Note: Rochester's football, baseball, and softball teams compete in the Liberty League.)	Yes	Yes	Yes	Yes	No	No	Yes	Yes
RPI Engineers	Rensselaer Polytechnic Institute	Troy	Liberty	Yes	Yes	Yes	Yes	Yes	Yes	Yes	Yes	Yes
Russell Sage Gators	Russell Sage College	Troy	Empire 8	No	Yes	Yes	Yes	Yes	No	No	Yes	Yes
St. John Fisher Cardinals	St. John Fisher University	Pittsford	Empire 8	Yes	Yes	Yes	Yes	Yes	Yes	Yes	Yes	Yes
St. Joseph's Bears	St. Joseph's University Brooklyn	New York City (Brooklyn)	Skyline	No	Yes	Yes	Yes	Yes	No	No	Yes	Yes
St. Joseph's Golden Eagles	St. Joseph's University Long Island	Patchogue	Skyline	No	Yes	Yes	Yes	Yes	No	No	Yes	Yes
St. Lawrence Saints	St. Lawrence University	Canton	Liberty	Yes	Yes	Yes	Yes	Yes	Yes	Yes	Yes	Yes
Sarah Lawrence Gryphons	Sarah Lawrence College	Bronxville	Skyline	No	Yes	Yes	No	Yes	No	No	Yes	Yes
Skidmore Thoroughbreds	Skidmore College	Saratoga Springs	Liberty	No	Yes	Yes	Yes	Yes	Yes	No	Yes	Yes
SUNY Canton Kangaroos	State University of New York at Canton	Canton	North Atlantic	No	Yes	Yes	Yes	Yes	Yes (Note: SUNY Canton's men's ice hockey team competes as an independent.)	Yes	Yes	Yes
SUNY Cobleskill Fighting Tigers	State University of New York at Cobleskill	Cobleskill	SUNYAC	No	Yes	Yes	Yes	Yes	No	No	Yes	Yes
SUNY Delhi Broncos	State University of New York at Delhi	Delhi	SUNYAC	No	Yes	Yes	No	Yes	No	No	Yes	Yes
SUNY Maritime Privateers	State University of New York Maritime College	Throggs Neck	Skyline	Yes	Yes	No	Yes	No	No	No	Yes	Yes
SUNY Poly Wildcats	State University of New York Polytechnic Institute	Utica	Empire 8	No	Yes	Yes	Yes	Yes	No	No	Yes	Yes
Union Garnet Chargers	Union College	Schenectady	Liberty	Yes	Yes	Yes	Yes	Yes	Yes	Yes	Yes	Yes
Utica Pioneers	Utica University	Utica	Empire 8	Yes	Yes	Yes	Yes	Yes	Yes	Yes	Yes	Yes
Vassar Brewers	Vassar College	Poughkeepsie	Liberty	No	Yes	Yes	Yes	No	No	No	Yes	Yes
William Smith Herons	William Smith College	Geneva	Liberty	No	No	Yes	No	Yes	No	Yes	No	Yes
Yeshiva Maccabees	Yeshiva University	New York City (Manhattan)	Skyline	No	Yes	Yes	Yes	Yes	No	No	Yes	Yes
York Cardinals	York College (New York)	New York City (Queens)	CUNYAC	No	Yes	Yes	No	Yes	No	No	Yes	Yes

== NJCAA ==
Team	College	City	Conference
Borough of Manhattan Panthers	Borough of Manhattan Community College	New York City (Manhattan)	CUNYAC
Bronx Broncos	Bronx Community College	New York City (The Bronx)	CUNYAC
Broome Hornets	Broome Community College	Binghamton	Mid-State
Cayuga Spartans	Cayuga Community College	Auburn	Mid-State
Clinton Cougars	Clinton Community College	Plattsburgh	Mountain Valley
Columbia Greene Twins	Columbia–Greene Community College	Hudson	Mountain Valley
Corning Red Barons	Corning Community College	Corning	Mid-State
Dutchess Falcons	Dutchess Community College	Poughkeepsie	Mid Hudson
Erie Kats	Erie Community College	Buffalo	Western New York
Fashion Institute of Technology Tigers	Fashion Institute of Technology	New York City (Manhattan)	Mid Hudson
Finger Lakes Lakers	Finger Lakes Community College	Canandaigua	Mid-State
Fulton-Montgomery Raiders	Fulton-Montgomery Community College	Johnstown	Mountain Valley
Genesee Cougars	Genesee Community College	Batavia	Western New York
Herkimer County Generals	Herkimer County Community College	Herkimer	Mountain Valley
Hostos Caimans	Hostos Community College	New York City (The Bronx)	CUNYAC
Hudson Valley Vikings	Hudson Valley Community College	Troy	Mountain Valley
Jamestown Jayhawks	Jamestown Community College	Jamestown	Western New York
Jamestown-Cattaraugus Jaguars	Jamestown Community College-Cattaraugus Campus	Olean	Western New York
Jefferson Cannoneers	Jefferson Community College	Watertown	Mid-State
Kingsborough Wave	Kingsborough Community College	New York City (Brooklyn)	CUNYAC
LaGuardia Red Hawks	LaGuardia Community College	New York City (Queens)	CUNYAC
Mohawk Valley Hawks	Mohawk Valley Community College	Utica	Mountain Valley
Monroe Mustangs	Monroe University	New York (New Rochelle, New York)	Independent
Monroe Express	Monroe University	New York City (The Bronx)	Independent
Monroe Community College Tribunes	Monroe Community College	Rochester	Western New York
Nassau Lions	Nassau Community College	Garden City	Mid Hudson
North Country Saint Bernanrds	North Country Community College	Saranac Lake	Mountain Valley
Onondaga Lazers	Onondaga Community College	Syracuse	Mid-State
Orange County Colts	Orange County Community College	Middletown	Mid Hudson
Queensborough Tigers	Queensborough Community College	New York City (Queens)	CUNYAC
Rockland Fighting Hawks	Rockland Community College	Suffern	Mid Hudson
Schenectady County Royals	Schenectady County Community College	Schenectady	Mountain Valley
Suffolk County Sharks	Suffolk County Community College	Selden	CUNYAC
Sullivan County General Dunkers	Sullivan County Community College	Loch Sheldrake	Mid Hudson
SUNY Adirondack Timberwolves	SUNY Adirondack	Queensbury	Mountain Valley
SUNY Niagara Thunderwolves	SUNY Niagara	Sanborn	Western New York
Tompkins Cortland Panthers	Tompkins Cortland Community College	Dryden	Mid-State
Ulster County Senators	Ulster County Community College	Stone Ridge	Mid Hudson
Westchester Vikings	Westchester Community College	Valhalla	Mid Hudson

== USCAA ==
Team	School	City	Conference
Albany College Panthers	Albany College of Pharmacy and Health Sciences	Albany	YSCC
Berkeley College Knights	Berkeley College	New York City	HVIAC
Bryant & Stratton Bobcats	Bryant & Stratton College	Albany	Independent
Bryant & Stratton Bobcats	Bryant & Stratton College	Buffalo	Independent
Bryant & Stratton Bobcats	Bryant & Stratton College	Rochester	Independent
Bryant & Stratton Bobcats	Bryant & Stratton College	Syracuse	Independent
CIA Steels	The Culinary Institute of America	Hyde Park	HVIAC
Davis College Falcons	Davis College	Johnson City	HVIAC
Five Towns Sound	Five Towns College	Dix Hills	HVIAC
King's College Lions	The King's College	New York City (Manhattan)	HVIAC
Paul Smith's Bobcats	Paul Smith's College	Paul Smiths	YSCC
SUNY-ESF Mighty Oaks	SUNY College of Environmental Science and Forestry	Syracuse	HVIAC
Vaughn College Warriors	Vaughn College of Aeronautics and Technology	New York City (Flushing)	HVIAC
Villa Maria Vikings	Villa Maria College	Buffalo	Independent
Word of Life Huskies	Word of Life Bible Institute	Pottersville	HVIAC

== See also ==
- List of NCAA Division I institutions
- List of NCAA Division II institutions
- List of NCAA Division III institutions
- List of NAIA institutions
- List of USCAA institutions
- List of NCCAA institutions
- List of NJCAA Division I institutions
- List of NJCAA Division II institutions
- List of NJCAA Division III institutions

== Notes ==
- This list is in a tabular format, with columns arranged in the following order, from left to right:
  - Athletic team description (short school name and nickname), with a link to the school's athletic program article if it exists. When only one nickname is listed, it is used for teams of both sexes. (Note that in recent years, many schools have chosen to use the same nickname for men's and women's teams even when the nickname is distinctly masculine.) When two nicknames are given, the first is used for men's teams and the other is used for women's teams. Different nicknames for a specific sport within a school are noted separately below the table.
  - Full name of school.
  - Location of school.
  - Conference of the school (if conference column is left blank, the school is either independent or the conference is unknown).
- Apart from the ongoing conversions, the following notes apply:
  - Following the normal standard of United States sports media, the terms "University" and "College" are ignored in alphabetization, unless necessary to distinguish schools (such as Boston College and Boston University) or are actually used by the media in normally describing the school (formerly the case for the College of Charleston, but media now use "Charleston" for that school's athletic program).
  - Schools are also alphabetized by the names they are most commonly referred to by sports media, with non-intuitive examples included in parentheses next to the school name. This means, for example, that campuses bearing the name "University of North Carolina" may variously be found at "C" (Charlotte), "N" (North Carolina, referring to the Chapel Hill campus), and "U" (the Asheville, Greensboro, Pembroke, and Wilmington campuses, all normally referred to as UNC-{campus name}).
  - The prefix "St.", as in "Saint", is alphabetized as if it were spelled out.
