= College basketball =

Basketball played by collegiate athletes

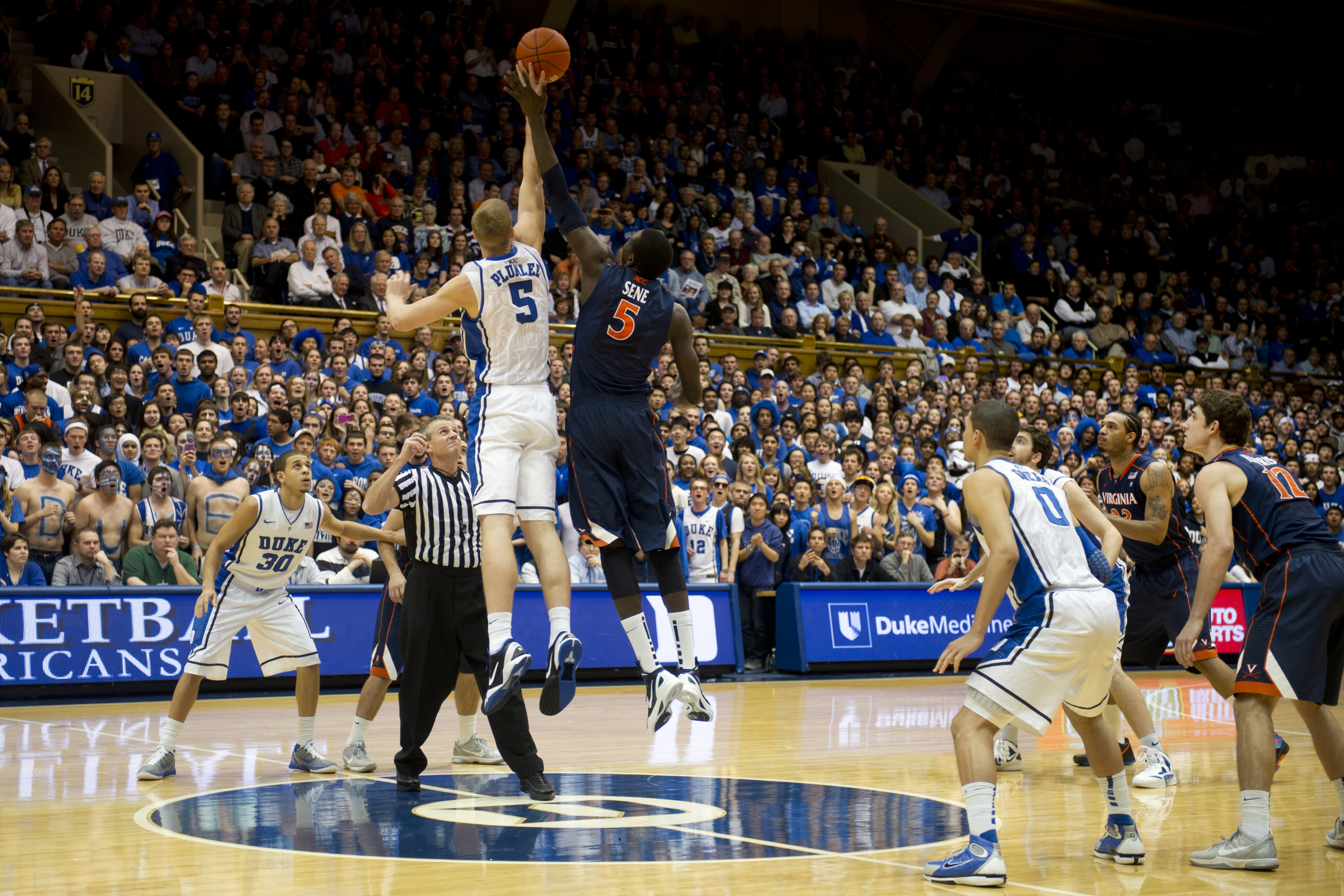
- Virginia Cavaliers vs. Duke Blue Devils in 2012
- Governing body: List: NCAA; NAIA; USCAA; NJCAA; NCCAA; 3C2A; ACCA (defunct); AIAW (defunct)
- First played: 1895 (Minnesota A&M vs. Hamline University, February 9, 1895)
- Clubs: 700 (NCAA); 230 (NAIA)

Club competitions
- Men's: Division I, Division II, Division III (NCAA); Championship (NAIA); Division I, Division II, Division III (NJCAA); Women's: Division I, Division II, Division III (NCAA); Championship (NAIA); Division I (NJCAA)

Audience records
- Single match: 74,340 (Villanova University vs. University of North Carolina at Chapel Hill, April 4, 2016 in Houston, Texas, USA)
- Season: 2016 NCAA Division I Basketball National Championship Game

College basketball is basketball that is played by teams of student-athletes at universities and colleges. In the United States, colleges and universities are governed by collegiate athletic bodies, including the National Collegiate Athletic Association (NCAA), the National Association of Intercollegiate Athletics (NAIA), the United States Collegiate Athletic Association (USCAA), the National Junior College Athletic Association (NJCAA), and the National Christian College Athletic Association (NCCAA). These national affiliation organizations may be subdivided into divisions, generally based on the number and level of scholarships that may be provided to the athletes. Institutions that play in Division II of the NCCAA are typically small Bible colleges. Some institutions may have multiple affiliations with the most common being USCAA and NCCAA. NCAA Division I does not allow this. An institution does not need to join a national affiliation organization to play college basketball, but this is very rare. As of 2025, Cheyney, a former NCAA member, fields a team with no national affiliation.

Each affiliation organization comprises conferences into which the vast majority of teams are divided. Traditionally, the location of a school has been a significant factor in determining conference affiliation. The bulk of the games on a team's schedule during the season are against fellow conference members. Therefore, geographic proximity of conference members allows local rivalries to develop and minimizes travel costs. Further, televised road games played in the same time zone as that of the visiting team's fans tend to draw larger audiences, which enhances the value of the media rights.

Institutional compatibility is another factor that may lead schools to band together in the same conference. For instance, as of 2025, all full members of the West Coast Conference are Christian colleges and universities located in the Pacific Time Zone. The Ivy League comprises institutions in the Northeast with similar, high academic standards that prefer to schedule nearly all their conference basketball games on Fridays and Saturdays, except during breaks between semesters, to minimize the disruption caused to the studies of the student-athletes.

Since the 1990s, geographic proximity has gradually become a less important factor in determining conference membership in NCAA Division I, the top tier competition of college basketball in the United States. For instance, the Big Ten Conference was originally composed of institutions in the Midwest. It has since expanded to include members in New Jersey, Maryland and Pennsylvania. On July 1, 2024, the Big Ten admitted four new members, all of which are located in the Pacific Time Zone. The Atlantic Coast Conference (ACC) had a footprint that extended from Maryland to Florida, with all members located in states on the Atlantic Coast in the 1990s. It has since expanded to include members in Massachusetts, New York, Pennsylvania, Kentucky and Indiana. In July and August 2024, the ACC admitted two new members located in California and one new member located in Texas.

The shifts in conference membership are primarily driven by schools seeking lucrative media rights deals and appropriately competitive playing partners for their football programs. In most cases, schools house as many of their sports in the same primary conference as possible. So, the football-driven changes in affiliation lead to changes in the composition of basketball conferences. When a conference loses a member to another conference, it will often try to recruit a replacement from a third conference. This triggers a domino effect, and smaller, less stable conferences struggle to remain large enough to compete at the same level as they had in the past. The smallest NCAA Division I conferences sometimes recruit Division II teams and help those institutions transition to Division I, in order to replace teams they have lost. Sometimes, this is done pre-emptively to make the conference larger and protect it against the possible loss of some of its teams.

Teams are not required to join conferences and may play as independents instead. Chicago State is the most recent independent basketball team in Division I of the NCAA, having competed as an independent for two seasons before joining the Northeast Conference in 2024. Finding opponents can be problematic for an independent team, particularly during the latter part of the season, when most other teams are regularly playing conference opponents. In addition, each conference gets an automatic bid to the NCAA tournament, which generates significant revenue for participating teams. Independent teams do not have access to such a pathway and must be selected at-large in order to participate in the tournament. This makes it hard for teams to make a name for themselves and gain attention from media. However, there are underdogs in the NCAA tournaments that get discovered for their grit and talent making them a team that others want to play next season. Those who don't have the opportunity of making it to the tournament and are lacking financially have the chance of losing their program entirely before every getting noticed, and this is a big issue for up and coming schools and teams.

Most games between conference opponents take place in the latter part of the season. While there are various rankings of teams throughout the entire NCAA, there are also conference standings based on the results of games against conference opponents. Once the conference schedule is complete, the conference stages a tournament that includes some or all of its teams. The regular-season conference standings are generally used to determine qualification for and seeding in the conference tournament.

A notable exception to the regular-season standings being used for seeding in the conference tournament were the 2023 and 2024 Western Athletic Conference (WAC) men's and women's tournaments. Regular-season conference standings determined qualification for the tournaments, but seeding was based on a formulaic ranking of the strength of the qualifiers, including their performances against non-conference opponents. Starting in 2025, the WAC returned to seeding the tournament based on the conference standings, and the formulaic ranking became part of the conference's tiebreaker procedure.

In most cases, the winner of the conference tournament receives an automatic bid to the NCAA tournament. However, teams that are in transition to Division I are not eligible to participate in the NCAA tournament. Under rules revised in 2025, the transition period from Division II to Division I generally takes three years and may be longer, if the team is coming from a different affiliation. Therefore, if such a team wins a conference tournament, the conference will use an alternative method to designate the team that receives its automatic bid. Some conferences allow transitioning teams to participate in their conference tournaments; others do not allow this.

== History ==
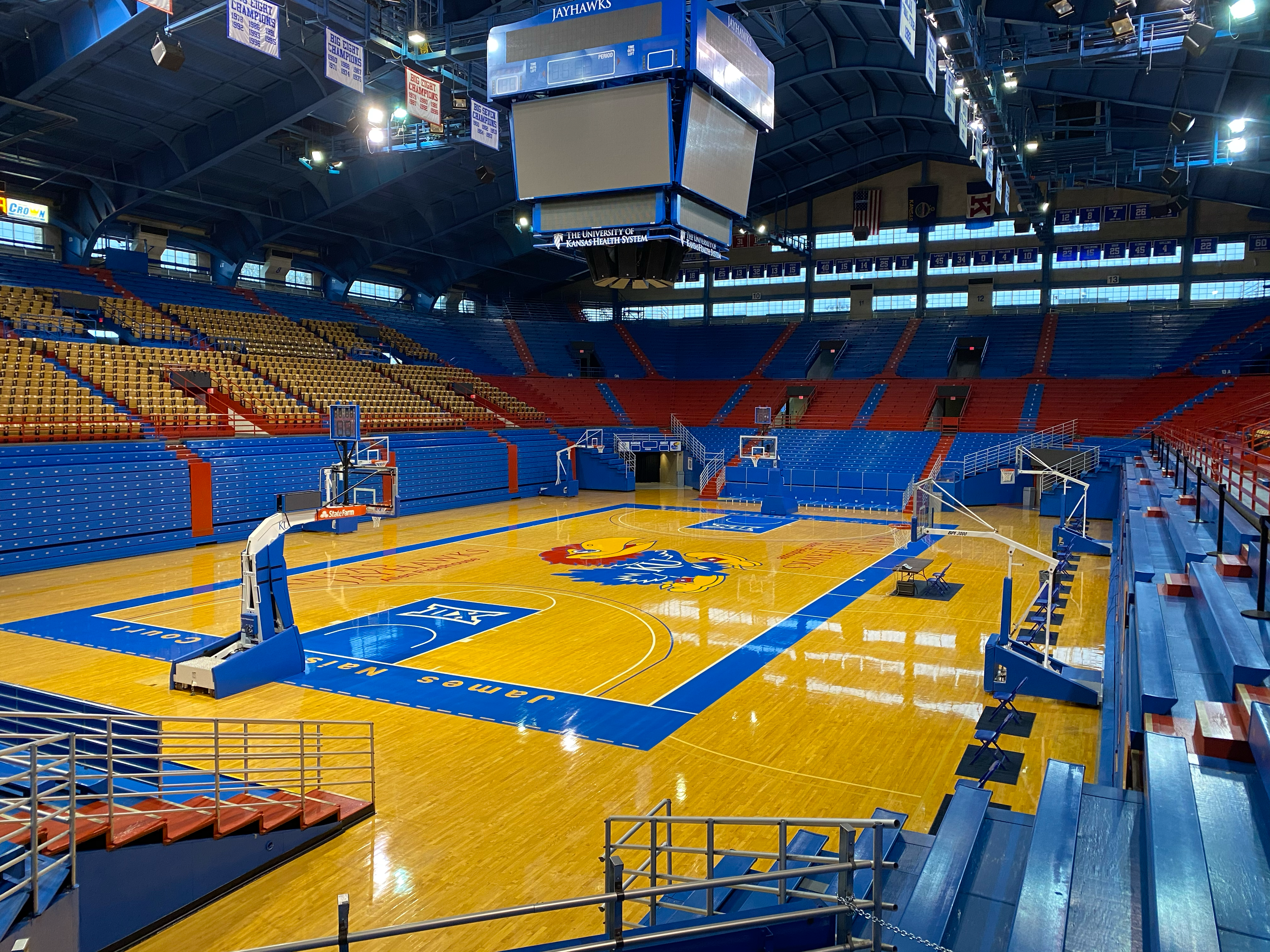
Naismith Court at Allen Fieldhouse in Lawrence, Kansas in 2021. The Kansas Jayhawks are among the most storied and historic programs at the collegiate level, due to their ties to James Naismith, the inventor of basketball

The history of basketball can be traced back to a YMCA International Training School, known today as Springfield College, located in Springfield, Massachusetts. The sport was created by physical education teacher James Naismith, who in the winter of 1891 was given the task of creating a game that would keep track athletes in shape and that would prevent them from getting hurt. The date of the first formal basketball game played at the Springfield YMCA Training School under Naismith's rules is generally given as December 21, 1891. Along with this during the history and rise of the college game of basketball many issues arose. These issues were known as "civil wars" in college basketball, according to Kurt Edward Kemper. At first all colleges were considered as equal competitors because there were no divisions or conferences which caused smaller schools to protest against this. Eventually they created the NIT program, but this was only for the larger colleges and universities, so they then in 1937 had to create the NAIB for smaller colleges. Basketball began to be played at some college campuses by 1893.

The first college basketball game televised was on February 28, 1940, when the University of Pittsburgh played Fordham University at Madison Square Garden in New York City. NBC broadcast the game through W2XBS, which was its experimental television station at the time. Pittsburgh defeated Fordham 57-37. An estimated 12 million people watched the game on television, while 52,693 fans attended in person.

=== Collegiate firsts ===
The first known college to field a basketball team against an outside opponent was Vanderbilt University, which played against the local YMCA in Nashville, Tennessee, on February 7, 1893, where Vanderbilt won 9–6. The second recorded instance of an organized college basketball game was Geneva College's game against New Brighton YMCA on April 8, 1893, in Beaver Falls, Pennsylvania, which Geneva won 3–0.

The first recorded game between two college teams occurred on November 22, 1894, when the Drexel Institute of Art, Science and Industry (now known as Drexel University) faced Temple College (now known as Temple University). Drexel won the game, which was played under rules allowing nine players per side, among many other variations from modern basketball, 26–1. The first intercollegiate match using the modern rule of five players per side is often credited as a game between the University of Chicago and the University of Iowa, in Iowa City, Iowa, on January 18, 1896. The Chicago team won the game 15-12, under the coaching of Amos Alonzo Stagg, who had learned the game from James Naismith at Springfield YMCA. However, some sources state the first "true" five-on-five intercollegiate match was a game in 1897 between Yale and Penn, because although the Iowa team that played Chicago in 1896 was composed of University of Iowa students, it reportedly did not officially represent the university, rather it was organized through a YMCA. By 1900, the game of basketball had spread to colleges across the country. During the 1930s, some college teams experimented with shorter halftime intervals.

=== Tournaments ===
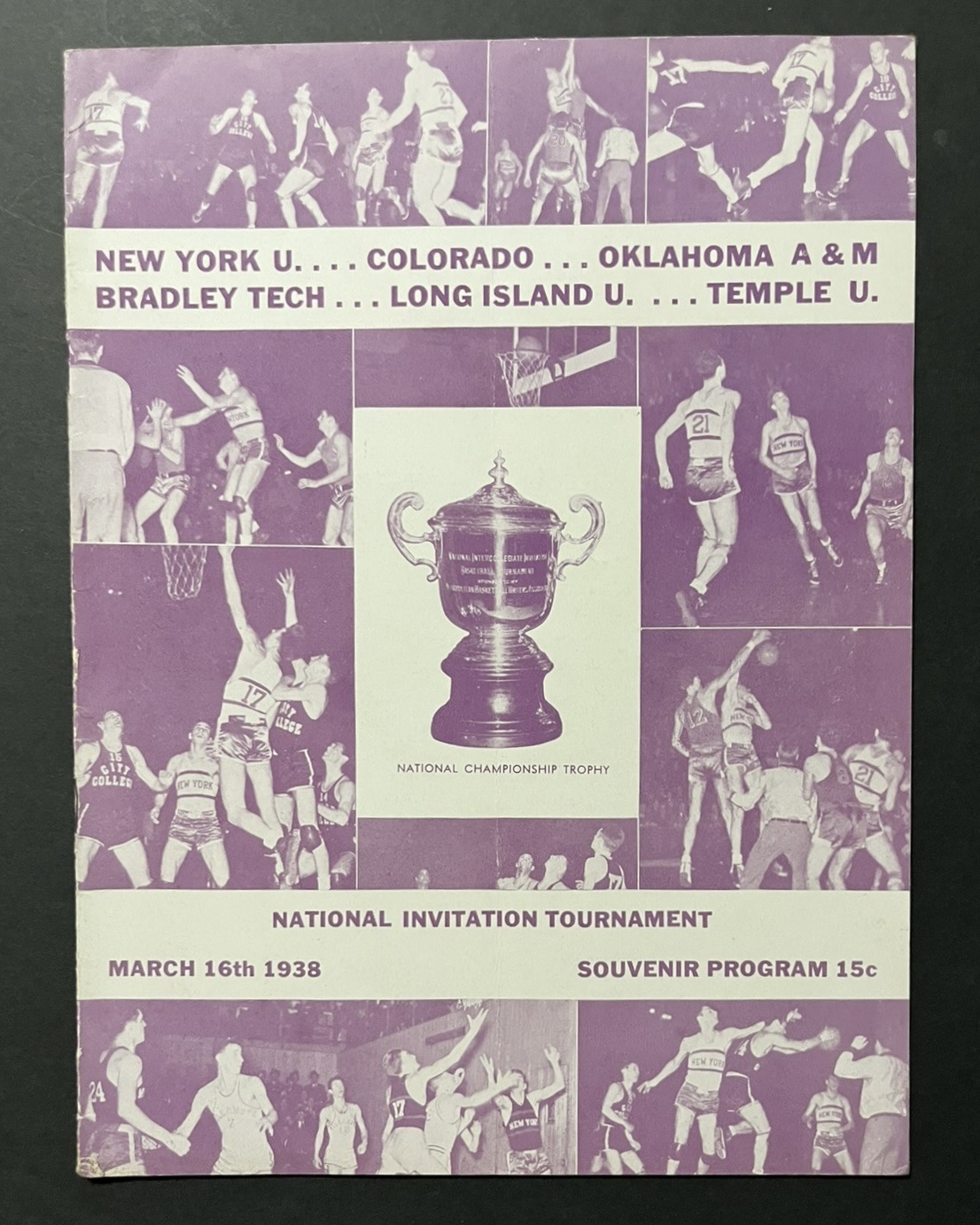
Souvenir program from the inaugural NIT showcasing the "National Championship Trophy", which was won by Temple in 1938

The Amateur Athletic Union's annual U.S. national championship tournament (first played in 1898) often featured collegiate teams playing against non-college teams. Four colleges won the AAU tournament championship: Utah (1916), NYU (1920), Butler (1924) and Washburn (1925). College teams were also runners-up in 1915, 1917, 1920, 1921, 1932 and 1934.

The first known tournament featuring exclusively college teams was the 1904 Summer Olympics, where basketball was a demonstration sport, and a collegiate championship tournament was held. The Olympic title was won by Hiram College. In March 1908, a two-game "championship series" was organized between the University of Chicago and Penn, with games played in Philadelphia and Bartlett, Illinois. Chicago swept both games to win the series.

In March 1922, the 1922 National Intercollegiate Basketball Tournament was held in Indianapolis – the first stand-alone post-season tournament exclusively for college teams. The champions of six major conferences participated: Pacific Coast Conference, Southern Intercollegiate Athletic Association, Western Pennsylvania League, Illinois Intercollegiate Athletic Conference, Michigan Intercollegiate Athletic Association and Indiana Intercollegiate Athletic Association. The Western Conference and Eastern Intercollegiate League declined invitations to participate. Wabash College won the 1922 tournament.

The first organization to tout a regularly occurring national collegiate championship was the NAIA in 1937, although it was quickly surpassed in prestige by the National Invitation Tournament, or NIT, which brought six teams to New York's Madison Square Garden in the spring of 1938. Temple defeated Colorado in the first NIT tournament championship game, 60–36.

==== NCAA tournament ====
In 1939, another national tournament was implemented by the National Collegiate Athletic Association (NCAA). The location of the NCAA tournament varied from year to year, and it soon used multiple locations each year, so more fans could see games without traveling to New York. While the NIT was created earlier and initially enjoyed a higher level of prestige due to substantial coverage from New York City media outlets, it ultimately lost popularity and status to the NCAA Tournament. In 1950, following a double win by the 1949–50 CCNY Beavers men's basketball team (when the NIT comprised 12 and the NCAA 8 teams), the NCAA ruled that no team could compete in both tournaments, which effectively indicated that a team eligible for the NCAA tournament should play in it. Not long afterward, assisted by the 1951 scandals based in New York City (which had the knock-on effect of New York City media giving less attention to collegiate basketball), the NCAA tournament had become more prestigious than before, with conference champions and the majority of top-ranked teams competing there. The NCAA tournament eventually overtook the NIT by 1960. Through the 1960s and 1970s, with UCLA leading the way as winner of ten NCAA Tournament championships, a shift in power to teams from the west amplified the shift of attention away from the New York City-based NIT. As the NCAA tournament expanded its field of teams from 25 to 32 in 1975, to 48 in 1980, to 64 in 1985, and to 68 teams in 2011, interest in the NCAA tournament increased again and again, as it comprised more and more teams, soon including all of the strongest ones. (Expansion also improved the distribution of playing locations, which number roughly one-third the number of teams in the field.)

In 2011, the NCAA field expanded to 68 teams and the last 8 teams playing for four spots making the field into 64, which is called the first round and so on. The former first round is called the second round, the second round is called the third round, and the Sweet Sixteen is the same, but it is technically the fourth round in the current format, etc.

In 2016, the field did not expand, but the round numbers changed again. The initial games containing the last 8 teams are now referred to as the First Four. Consequently, the first round does not start until the First Four games are out of the way and the field is narrowed to 64 teams. So after the first four games the first round starts instead of that being the second round. The Second is now when there are 32 teams left, the sweet sixteen is the third round, and so on.

In 2020, for the first time in the NCAA's history, the tournament had to be canceled due to fears of the COVID-19 pandemic. This move was done largely out of fear of the virus spreading to players and watchers, with prior attempts to limit the spread without canceling by first choosing to limit attendees, and then canceling the tournament in its entirety.

The cancellation of the tournament led to much uncertainty for the coaches, players, and NCAA as a whole. Many people were very disappointed and had wished it was just delayed, rather than completely being cancelled. The pandemic affected the seniors on the teams, considering their last season was abruptly taken from them. The NCAA eventually granted an extra year of eligibility to all student-athletes enrolled in 2020 in recognition of the fact that many of them had lost a full season of competition or chance at a national championship through no fault of their own. However, many of the seniors were projected to be picked in the NBA draft, so this led to the difficult decision of playing one more year with their college teammates or moving on to the big stage.

In 2021, the tournament was able to take place, albeit at a centralized "bubble" for both genders and with many games held without fans in attendance to limit COVID-19 exposure. The men's tournament was held at sites in and near Indianapolis, Indiana, while the women's tournament was centered in San Antonio, Texas. Baylor was the Men's 2021 NCAA Champions. In 2022, Kansas won the tournament, defeating North Carolina in the championship. For the women's competition, the 2021 champions were Stanford, who defeated Arizona in a very close game. In 2022, the women's NCAA champions was South Carolina, defeating UConn in the championship. LSU's women and UConn's men were the 2023 national champions, defeating Iowa and San Diego State, respectively, in the championship games.

==== National Invitation Tournament (NIT) ====
The National Invitation Tournament (NIT) is an annual men's college basketball tournament operated by the National Collegiate Athletic Association (NCAA). Since 2023, all rounds of the tournament are played at various sites across the country which are selected annually. From its founding in 1938 to 2022, the semifinals and finals were always played at Madison Square Garden (MSG) in New York City. Predating the NCAA Division I men's basketball tournament by one year, the NIT was considered the most prestigious post-season showcase for college basketball before its status was superseded in the mid-1950s by the NCAA tournament.

A second, much more recent "NIT" tournament is played in November and known as the NIT Season Tip-Off. Formerly the "Preseason NIT" (and still sometimes referred to as such colloquially), it was founded in 1985. Unlike the postseason NIT, its final rounds are played at Madison Square Garden. Both tournaments were operated by the Metropolitan Intercollegiate Basketball Association (MIBA) until 2005, when they were purchased by the NCAA, and the MIBA disbanded.

Unless otherwise qualified, the terms National Invitation Tournament or NIT refer to the post-season tournament in both common and official use.

=== Racial integration ===
Racial integration of all-white collegiate sports teams was high on the regional agenda in the 1950s and 1960s. These issues included inequality, racism, and the alumni demand for the top players needed to win high-profile games. The Atlantic Coast Conference (ACC) took the lead. "College basketball data allow for direct comparisons of the racial differences in the marginal revenues generated by players" (Brown and Jewell 1995). First they started to schedule integrated teams from the North. The wake-up call came in 1966 when Don Haskins's Texas Western College team with five black starters defeated the all-white University of Kentucky team to win the NCAA national basketball championship. This happened at a time when there weren't any black varsity basketball players in either the Southeastern Conference or the Southwest Conference. Finally ACC schools—typically under pressure from boosters and civil rights groups—integrated their teams. With an alumni base that dominated local and state politics, society and business, the ACC flagship schools were successful in their endeavor—as Pamela Grundy argues, they had learned how to win:

The widespread admiration that athletic ability inspired would help transform athletic fields from grounds of symbolic play to forces for social change, places where a wide range of citizens could publicly and at times effectively challenge the assumptions that cast them as unworthy of full participation in U.S. society. While athletic successes would not rid society of prejudice or stereotype—black athletes would continue to confront racial slurs...[minority star players demonstrated] the discipline, intelligence, and poise to contend for position or influence in every arena of national life.

=== Suspension of Yale University ===
In 1969, for the first time, the NCAA Council did not permit participation by American college basketball players in the Maccabiah Games. The Maccabiah Games are an international multi-sport event held in Israel, open to all Jewish athletes from around the world, and to all Israeli citizens regardless of their religion. In 1961 the Games were declared a "Regional Sports Event" by, and under the auspices and supervision of, the International Olympic Committee. The NCAA failed to permit such participation by American college basketball players despite the fact that it had permitted such participation in the past and continued to permit participation by American college athletes in other Maccabiah Games sports, such as swimming, track, fencing, and soccer.

Basketball was different, however. In that the Amateur Athletic Union (AAU) – with which the NCAA was locked in a bitter power struggle – was for the first time organizing the Team USA basketball team for the Maccabiah Games, a role that had formerly been held by the NCAA. NCAA executive director Walter Byers, whom the Harvard Crimson described as "power-mad" and others described as a "petty tyrant", headed the NCAA and was involved in the decision. The Eastern College Athletic Conference (ECAC), an affiliate of the NCAA, followed the NCAA's orders on sanctions. The New York Times reported that the failure of the NCAA to permit such participation in Maccabiah basketball was believed "to stem from the N.C.A.A.'s feud with the Amateur Athletic Union over control of [amateur] athletes." Author Leonard Shecter called the NCAA decision a "classic example of NCAA stupidity".

In 1969—against the wishes of the NCAA—Yale University Jewish center Jack Langer played for Team United States at the 1969 Maccabiah Games in Israel. He did so with the approval of Yale President Kingman Brewster, the university said it would not stop Langer from "what we feel is a matter of religious freedom," and all Ivy League presidents fully endorsed Yale's stand. Thereafter, Yale played Langer in basketball games the following season. A special assistant to the President of Yale, Henry Chauncey Jr., said: "There is no question that Jack Langer will continue to play basketball. We don't care what they do - Jack Langer will play when the coach wants to use him." On January 15, 1970, the NCAA Council placed Yale University on two‐year "full athletic probation" in all sports. It thereby restricted Yale teams and athletes (not just basketball players) for two years from competing in NCAA tournaments, championships and other postseason competitions, and from receiving any money for televised events. The decision impacted 300 Yale students, every Yale student on its sports teams, over the next two years.

The Presidents of the other seven Ivy League schools issued a statement condemning the NCAA's actions in regard to the "Langer Case". The Harvard Crimson called the probation "not only unjust, but intolerable", and urged the Ivy League to withdraw from the NCAA. Harvard track and field captain Ed Nosal and two other Harvard athletes, sympathetic to Langer and Yale and disdainful of the absurdity of the NCAA rule, protested at the 1970 NCAA Indoor Track and Field Championships by standing on the awards stand wearing blue Yale jerseys. In February 1970, Representative Robert N. Giaimo (D-Connecticut) said in the U.S. Congress:

The Yale case, involving basketball player Jack Langer, is tragic. It shows that the NCAA is willing to use any weapon in its continuing power struggle with the Amateur Athletic Union. It shows that the NCAA does not care if it hurts member institutions or individual athletes in the process. It shows once again that the NCAA is ... under the control of a stubborn, dictatorial hierarchy that does not hesitate to use athletes and schools alike as mere pawns in a game of power politics.

=== Original rules ===
The original rules for basketball were very different from today's modern rules of the sport, including the use of eight players per side. James Naismith established 13 original rules:

1. The ball may be thrown in any direction with one or both hands.
2. The ball may be batted in any direction with one or both hands, but never with the fist.
3. A player cannot run with the ball. The player must throw it from the spot on which he catches it, with allowance to be made for a man who catches the ball when running at a good speed.
4. The ball must be held by the hands. The arms or body must not be used for holding it.
5. No shouldering, holding, pushing, striking, or tripping in any way of an opponent is allowed. The first infringement of this rule by any person shall count as a foul; the second shall disqualify him until the next goal is made or, if there was evident intent to injure the person, for the whole of the game. No substitution shall be allowed.
6. A foul will be called when a player is seen striking at the ball with the fist, or when violations of rules 3 and 4 and such as described in rule 5 have been made.
7. If either side makes three consecutive fouls it shall count as a goal for the opponents ("consecutive" means without the opponents in the meantime making a foul).
8. A goal shall be made when the ball is thrown or batted from the grounds into the basket and stays there, providing those defending the goal do not touch or disturb the goal. If the ball rests on the edges, and the opponent moves the basket, it shall count as a goal.
9. When the ball goes out of bounds, it shall be thrown into the field and played by the first person touching it. In case of dispute the umpire shall throw it straight into the field. The thrower-in is allowed five seconds. If he holds it longer, it shall go to the opponent. If any side persists in delaying the game, the umpire shall call a foul on them.
10. The umpire shall be the judge of the men and shall note the fouls and notify the referee when three consecutive fouls have been made. He shall have power to disqualify men according to rule 5.
11. The referee shall be judge of the ball and shall decide when the ball is in play, in bounds, to which side it belongs, and shall keep the time. He shall decide when a goal has been made and keep account of the goals, with any other duties that are usually performed by a referee.
12. The time shall be two fifteen-minute halves, with five minutes rest between.
13. The side making the most goals in that time shall be declared the winner.

=== History of NCAA basketball rule changes ===
The following is a list of some of the major NCAA Basketball rule changes with the year they went into effect.

Season	Rule Change		
1891–92	The first set of rules is created.		
1900–01	A dribbler may not shoot for a field goal and may dribble only once, and then with two hands.		
1908–09	A dribbler is permitted to shoot. The dribble is defined as the "continuous passage of the ball", making the double dribble illegal. Players are disqualified upon committing their fourth personal foul (women).		
1910–11	Players are disqualified upon committing their fourth personal foul (men). No coaching is allowed during the progress of the game by anybody connected with either team. A warning is given for the first violation and a free throw is awarded after that.		
1917–18	Players are disqualified upon committing their fifth personal foul (women only).		
1920–21	The basket is moved to two feet from the baseline. Previously the players could climb the padded wall to get closer to the basket (with the new rule the wall is out of bounds). A player can re-enter a game once. Before this rule, if a player left the game, he could not re-enter for the rest of the game.		
1921–22	Running with the ball was changed from a foul to a violation.		
1923–24	The player fouled must shoot his own free throws. Before this rule, one person usually shot all the free throws for a team.		
1928–29	The charging foul by the dribbler is introduced.		
1930–31	A held ball may be called when a closely guarded player is withholding the ball from play for 5 seconds.		
1932–33	The 10-second (mid-court) line is introduced to reduce stalling (men only). No player with the ball may stand in the free throw lane for more than 3 seconds.		
1933–34	A player may re-enter a game twice.		
1935–36	No offensive player (with or without the ball) may stand in the free throw lane for more than 3 seconds.		
1937–38	The center jump after every made basket is eliminated.		
1938–39	The ball will be thrown in from out of bounds at mid-court by the team shooting a free throw after a technical foul. Previously, the ball was put into play by a center jump after the technical free throw.		
1939–40	Teams have the option of taking a free throw or taking the ball at midcourt.		
1942–43	Any player who has yet to foul out will be allowed to receive a fifth foul in overtime.		
1944–45	Defensive goaltending is banned. Five personal fouls disqualifies a player; no extra foul is permitted in overtime (men). Unlimited substitution is allowed. Offensive players cannot stand in the free throw lane for more than 3 seconds.		
1948–49	Coaches are allowed to speak to players during a timeout.		
1951–52	Games are to be played in four 10-minute quarters. Previously it was two 20-minute halves.		
1952–53	Teams can no longer waive free throws and take the ball at midcourt.		
1954–55	The one-and-one free throw is introduced allowing a player to take a second free throw if the first one is made. Games return to two 20-minute halves.		
1955–56	The two-shot penalty in existence for the last 3 minutes of each half is eliminated; the one-and-one free throw exists for the whole game.		
1956–57	The free-throw lane is increased from 6 feet to 12 feet in width. On the lineup for a free throw, the two spaces adjacent to the end line must be occupied by opponents of the shooter. In the past, one space was marked 'H' for the home team, and one 'V' for the visitors. Grasping the rim is ruled unsportsmanlike conduct.		
1957–58	Offensive goaltending is now banned. One free throw for each common foul for the first six personal fouls in a half, and the one-and-one is used thereafter.		
1967–68	The dunk is made illegal during the game and during warmups.		
1969–70	Women's basketball introduces the five-player full-court game on an experimental basis.		
1971–72	The five-player full-court game becomes mandatory for women's basketball. The 30-second shot clock is introduced (women only).		
1972–73	The free throw on the common foul for the first six personal fouls in a half is eliminated. An official can charge a technical foul on a player for unsportsmanlike conduct if the official deems the player 'flopped' to get a charging call. Freshmen are now eligible to play varsity basketball.		
1973–74	Officials can now penalize players away from the ball for fouls for acts such as holding, grabbing and illegal screens.		
1976–77	The dunk is made legal again.		
1981–82	The jump ball is eliminated except for the start of the game and overtime if necessary. An alternating arrow will indicate possession of the ball in jump-ball situations in a game (men only).		
1982–83	When a closely guarded player is guarded for 5 seconds, a jump ball is no longer required. Instead a turnover is created and the ball goes to the other team.		
1983–84	Two free throws are issued if a foul occurs in the last two minutes of a half or in overtime (men only). This rule was rescinded a month into the season, before the start of conference play.		
1984–85	A new, smaller ball ("size 6"; 28.5 inches circumference, 18 ounces) is introduced for women's play.		
1985–86	The 45-second shot clock is introduced for men's play. If a shooter is intentionally fouled and the basket is missed, the shooter will get two free throws and the team will get possession of the ball.		
1986–87	A three-point shot was introduced, with the line a uniform 19 feet 9 inches (6.02 m) from the center of the basket. Mandatory for men's basketball; experimental for women's. The men's alternating possession rule is extended to the women's game.		
1987–88	The men's three-point line was made mandatory for women's basketball. Each intentional personal foul gives the non-fouling team two free throws and possession of the ball (men only). The NCAA adopts a single rule book for men's and women's basketball for the first time, although some rules differ between the sexes to this day.		
1988–89	The men's rule regarding intentional fouls is extended to the women's game.		
1990–91	Beginning with a team's 10th foul in a half, two free throws (the so-called "double bonus") are to be awarded for each non-shooting personal foul on the defense, and each loose-ball foul (men only). Three free throws are awarded when a shooter is fouled from three-point range and misses the shot (both men and women).		
1993–94	The men's shot clock is reduced from 45 seconds to 35 seconds. The game clock will be stopped with successful baskets in the last minute of each half and in the last minute of overtime, with no substitution permitted. The 5-second rule regarding closely guarded players is eliminated.		
1994–95	Scoring is restricted to a tap-in when 0.3 seconds or less remains on the game clock (men and women).		
1997–98	The 5-second rule regarding closely guarded players is reinstated. Timeouts can be made by players on the court or the head coach. The "double bonus" introduced to the men's game in 1990 is extended to the women's game.		
1998–99	In a held ball situation initiated by the defense, the defense shall gain possession of the ball regardless of the possession arrow.		
1999–2000	The held ball rule from 1998 to 1999 was rescinded. Maximum of five players occupying lane spaces during free throws in women's play (two from the shooting team, three from the defending team).		
2000–01	In women's play only, if the defending team commits a foul during a throw-in after a made basket or free throw, the team putting the ball in play retains the right to run the end line during the subsequent throw-in.		
2001–02	In women's play, six players now allowed in lane spaces (four defenders, two offensive players). Additionally, the defensive players nearest the basket are now required to line up in the second space from the basket.		
2005–06	Kicked balls will no longer reset the shot clock. If the violation occurs with less than 15 seconds, the clock will be reset to 15 seconds.		
2006–07	A timeout called by an airborne player falling out of bounds will not be recognized.		
2007–08	The women's rule regarding lane alignment during free throws (maximum of four defenders and two offensive players, with the nearest defenders on the second space from the basket) is extended to the men's game.		
2008–09	Three-point arc extended to 20 feet 9 inches (6.32 m) from the center of the basket for men's play only. Referees may use instant replay to determine if a flagrant foul has been committed and who started the incident. When the entire ball is over the level of the basket during a shot and touches the backboard, it is a goaltending violation if the ball is subsequently touched, even if still moving upward.		
2011–12	Women's three-point arc extended to match men's arc. Restricted area arc created 3 feet from the center of the basket (men and women). When an offensive player makes contact with a defender who establishes position within this area, the resulting foul is blocking on the defender.		
2013–14	10-second backcourt rule introduced (women only). Any timeout called within the 30 seconds preceding a scheduled media timeout break replaces the media timeout (women only).		
2015–16	The men's shot clock changed to 30 seconds, making it identical to the women's shot clock. Coaches prohibited from calling timeouts from the bench in live-ball situations; players remain free to do so. Restricted area arc extended from 3 feet to 4 feet from the center of the basket (men only). Dunks are permitted during warm-ups. Number of timeouts for each team reduced from 5 to 4. Women's basketball changed from 20-minute halves to 10-minute quarters. In women's basketball, bonus free throws come into effect on the fifth team foul in a quarter; all bonus free throw situations result in two free throws. The women's rule regarding timeouts within 30 seconds of a scheduled media timeout was extended to the men's game.		
2016–17	Coaches allowed to call timeouts from the bench during inbounds plays before the pass is released.		
2017–18	Men only: The shot clock will be reset to 20 seconds, or the amount remaining on the shot clock if greater, when the ball is inbounded in the frontcourt after (1) a defensive foul or (2) a deliberate kick or fisting of the ball by the defense. Men only: If an injured player is unable to shoot free throws as the result of a flagrant foul, or if the player is bleeding, only his substitute can shoot the ensuing free throws. Men only: When the ball is legally touched inbounds and an official immediately signals a clock stoppage, a minimum of 0.3 seconds must elapse on the game clock. Men only: A player dunking the ball may hold onto the rim to prevent injury to himself or another player, even if it would result in another violation. Women only: No new 10-second backcourt count awarded if the team in possession is granted and charged a timeout. Women's basketball adopted the men's 4-foot restricted area arc. Women only: Abandoned the "flagrant-1" and "flagrant-2" foul designations in favor of the FIBA standard of "unsportsmanlike" and "disqualifying" fouls. The new "unsportsmanlike" designation now includes contact dead-ball technicals.		
2019–20	Men and women: For men's basketball, the three-point arc was extended to the FIBA distance of 6.75 meters (22 ft 2 in) from the center of the basket and 6.6 meters (21 ft 8 in) in the corners. This change took immediate effect in Division I, and will take effect in Divisions II and III in 2020–21. In women's basketball, the FIBA arc was planned be used as an experimental rule in postseason events apart from the NCAA championships (such as the WNIT and WBI), but none of these events were held in 2020.; After an offensive rebound in the frontcourt, the shot clock resets to 20 seconds, regardless of the amount of time remaining on the shot clock.; Men only: Coaches are once again able to call live-ball timeouts from the bench, but only in the last 2 minutes of regulation time or the last 2 minutes of any overtime.; The list of calls reviewable by instant replay expanded to include basket interference and goaltending, but only in the last 2 minutes of regulation time or the last 2 minutes of any overtime.; Technical fouls will be assessed for derogatory comments on an opponent's race, ethnicity, national origin, religion, gender, gender expression, gender identity, sexual orientation or disability.; Women only: The shot clock reset rule on defensive fouls and certain defensive violations adopted in the men's game in 2017–18 was extended to the women's game.; After any technical foul, the non-fouling team is awarded the ball at midcourt.; A player who receives one technical and one unsportsmanlike foul in the same game is automatically ejected.; If referees are at the replay monitor to review an unsportsmanlike or contact disqualifying foul, they can address any other acts of misconduct during the sequence being reviewed.; (2021) The National Collegiate Athletic Association (NCAA) introduced new rules allowing college athletes to make money off their name, image, and likeness (NIL), marking a massive shift in college athletics. Before these changes, athletes were restricted from receiving compensation beyond scholarships, which caused long-standing debates about fairness and amateurism. Under NIL policies, players in NCAA Division I men's basketball can now make money through endorsements and sponsorships while maintaining eligibility. The introduction of NIL has significantly impacted recruiting and competition in college basketball. Programs with larger fan bases and greater media exposure may provide athletes with more opportunities for financial gain. The policy change has also contributed to the growing commercialization of college sports and continues to raise questions about the role of amateurism in the NCAA. https://www.scu.edu/business/blog/business-concepts/what-is-nil/ https://www.stlouisfed.org/publications/page-one-economics/2023/07/13/what-should-college-athletes-be-paid-market-structure-and-the-ncaa	2022-23	The three-point line was moved from twenty feet and nine inches to 22 feet 1.75 inches. The women's line stayed the same distance. The shot clock will change to only 20 seconds on any offensive rebound. Players are assessed a Class B technical foul for a flop (men only).

=== One-and-done and suspension rule ===
The one-and-done rule has been a part of college basketball since 2006, the first NBA draft it affected. The rule was created by NBA Commissioner, David Stern, which changed the draft age from 18 years old to 19 years old. This change meant players could not be drafted into the NBA straight out of high school. Instead, however, they usually went to a college to play only one season before entering the following NBA draft when they were eligible, hence the name one-and-done. The first player to be drafted during this "one-and-done era" was Tyrus Thomas, a forward out of Louisiana State, who was drafted fourth overall in 2006. Along with the one and done rule, they also added the rule of players not being allowed to participate in any professional or NBA camps or activities until they are officially done with college basketball, and if any one is to break this rule it results in a one-game suspension.

== Conferences ==
=== NCAA Division I ===
In 2025–26, a total of 364 schools (including those transitioning from a lower NCAA division to Division I) will play men's basketball in 31 Division I basketball conferences. All of these schools also sponsor women's basketball except The Citadel and VMI, two military colleges that were all-male until the 1990s and remain overwhelmingly male today.

The conferences for 2025–26 are

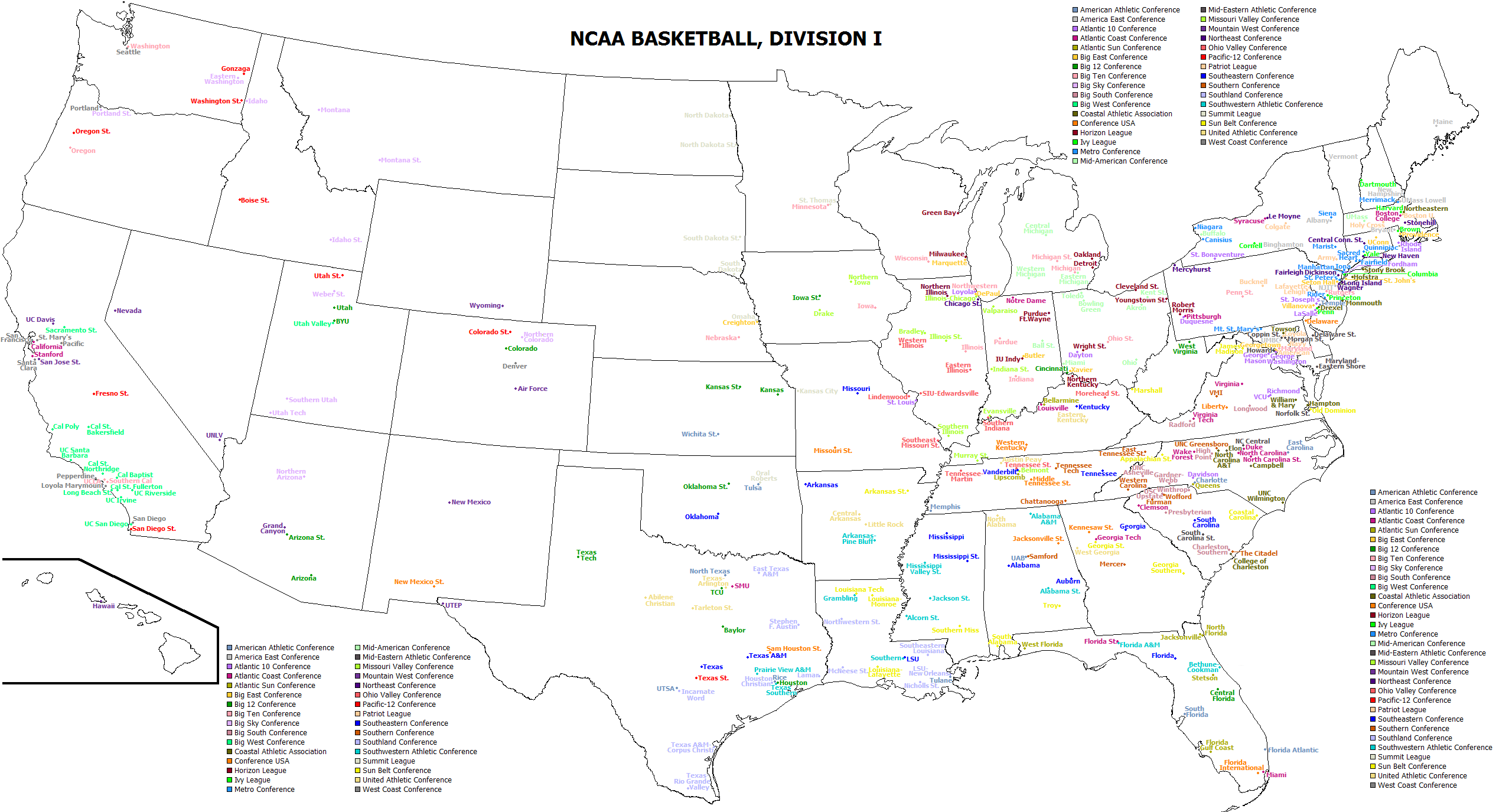
A map of all NCAA Division I basketball teams

- America East Conference
- American Athletic Conference
- Atlantic 10 Conference
- Atlantic Coast Conference
- Atlantic Sun Conference
- Big 12 Conference
- Big East Conference
- Big Sky Conference
- Big South Conference
- Big Ten Conference
- Big West Conference
- Coastal Athletic Association
- Conference USA
- Horizon League
- Ivy League
- Metro Atlantic Athletic Conference
- Mid-American Conference
- Mid-Eastern Athletic Conference
- Missouri Valley Conference
- Mountain West Conference
- Northeast Conference
- Ohio Valley Conference
- Pac-12 Conference (Note: Inactive for the 2025–26 season. Its remaining two members will play the 2024–25 and 2025–26 seasons as affiliate members of the West Coast Conference.)
- Patriot League
- Southeastern Conference
- Southern Conference
- Southland Conference
- Southwestern Athletic Conference
- Sun Belt Conference
- Summit League
- West Coast Conference
- Western Athletic Conference

Notes

In the early decades of college basketball, and well into the 1970s, many schools played as independents, with no conference membership. However, the rise of televised college sports in the 1980s led to the formation of many new conferences and the expansion of previously existing conferences. There are currently no Division I independent schools. The most recent D-I independent was Chicago State, which joined the Northeast Conference for the 2024–25 season.

=== NCAA Division II ===
As of the 2025–26 college basketball season, there are 23 Division II basketball conferences:

A map of all NCAA Division II basketball teams

- California Collegiate Athletic Association
- Central Atlantic Collegiate Conference
- Central Intercollegiate Athletic Association
- Conference Carolinas
- East Coast Conference
- Great American Conference
- Great Lakes Intercollegiate Athletic Conference
- Great Lakes Valley Conference
- Great Midwest Athletic Conference
- Great Northwest Athletic Conference
- Gulf South Conference
- Lone Star Conference
- Mid-America Intercollegiate Athletics Association
- Mountain East Conference
- Northeast-10 Conference
- Northern Sun Intercollegiate Conference
- Pacific West Conference
- Peach Belt Conference
- Pennsylvania State Athletic Conference
- Rocky Mountain Athletic Conference
- South Atlantic Conference
- Southern Intercollegiate Athletic Conference
- Sunshine State Conference

There are currently four independent Division II schools without conference affiliations for the 2025–26 season: Salem, UPR-Rio Piedras, UPR-Mayaguez, and UPR-Bayamon; the latter three also maintain dual membership in both the Liga Atlética Interuniversitaria de Puerto Rico as well as NCAA Division II.

The most recent change in the list of Division II conferences is the demise of the Heartland Conference, which disbanded at the end of the 2018–19 school year. In 2017, eight of its nine members announced a mass exodus to the Lone Star Conference (LSC) effective in 2019. The remaining member would soon announce that it would become a de facto member of the Mid-America Intercollegiate Athletics Association (MIAA), and one of the original eight schools to announce a move to the LSC later changed course and chose to become a de facto MIAA member as well.

=== NCAA Division III ===
- Allegheny Mountain Collegiate Conference
- American Rivers Conference
- American Southwest Conference
- Atlantic East Conference
- Centennial Conference
- City University of New York Athletic Conference
- Coast to Coast Athletic Conference
- College Conference of Illinois and Wisconsin
- Collegiate Conference of the South
- Conference of New England
- Empire 8 Conference
- Great Northeast Athletic Conference
- Heartland Collegiate Athletic Conference
- Landmark Conference
- Liberty League
- Little East Conference
- MAC Commonwealth (Note: One of the three leagues operated by the Middle Atlantic Conferences (MAC).)
- MAC Freedom
- Massachusetts State Collegiate Athletic Conference
- Michigan Intercollegiate Athletic Association
- Midwest Conference
- Minnesota Intercollegiate Athletic Conference
- New England Small College Athletic Conference
- New England Women's and Men's Athletic Conference
- New Jersey Athletic Conference
- North Atlantic Conference
- North Coast Athletic Conference
- Northern Athletics Collegiate Conference
- Northwest Conference
- Ohio Athletic Conference
- Old Dominion Athletic Conference
- Presidents' Athletic Conference
- St. Louis Intercollegiate Athletic Conference
- Skyline Conference
- Southern Athletic Association
- Southern California Intercollegiate Athletic Conference
- Southern Collegiate Athletic Conference
- State University of New York Athletic Conference
- United East Conference
- University Athletic Association
- Upper Midwest Athletic Conference
- USA South Athletic Conference
- Wisconsin Intercollegiate Athletic Conference

There are currently two independent Division III schools without conference affiliations for the 2025–26 season: Maranatha Baptist and Trinity Washington.

Notes

The most recent changes to the roster of D-III conferences came in 2023. The New England Collegiate Conference, which had been decimated earlier in the decade by the closure of several of its member schools and conference realignment in Division III, disbanded as an all-sports conference. (It remains in operation for men's volleyball and the non-NCAA esports.) The Colonial States Athletic Conference and United East Conference merged after the 2022–23 season under the United East banner. The last previous change came in 2020, when the American Collegiate Athletic Association merged into the Capital Athletic Conference, with the merged entity soon renaming itself the Coast to Coast Athletic Conference.

Since its introduction in 1973, Division III has always had the lowest share of Black coaches. As of 2015, less than 10% of the coaches in Division III were black (compared to around 20% in Division II and 25% in Division I).

=== NAIA ===
From 1992 to 2020, the NAIA operated separate Division I and Division II men's and women's basketball championships; the distinction between the two divisions was that D-I schools awarded basketball scholarships while D-II schools chose not to. Basketball divisions were abolished after the 2019–20 season, and single men's and women's championships have been held since then.

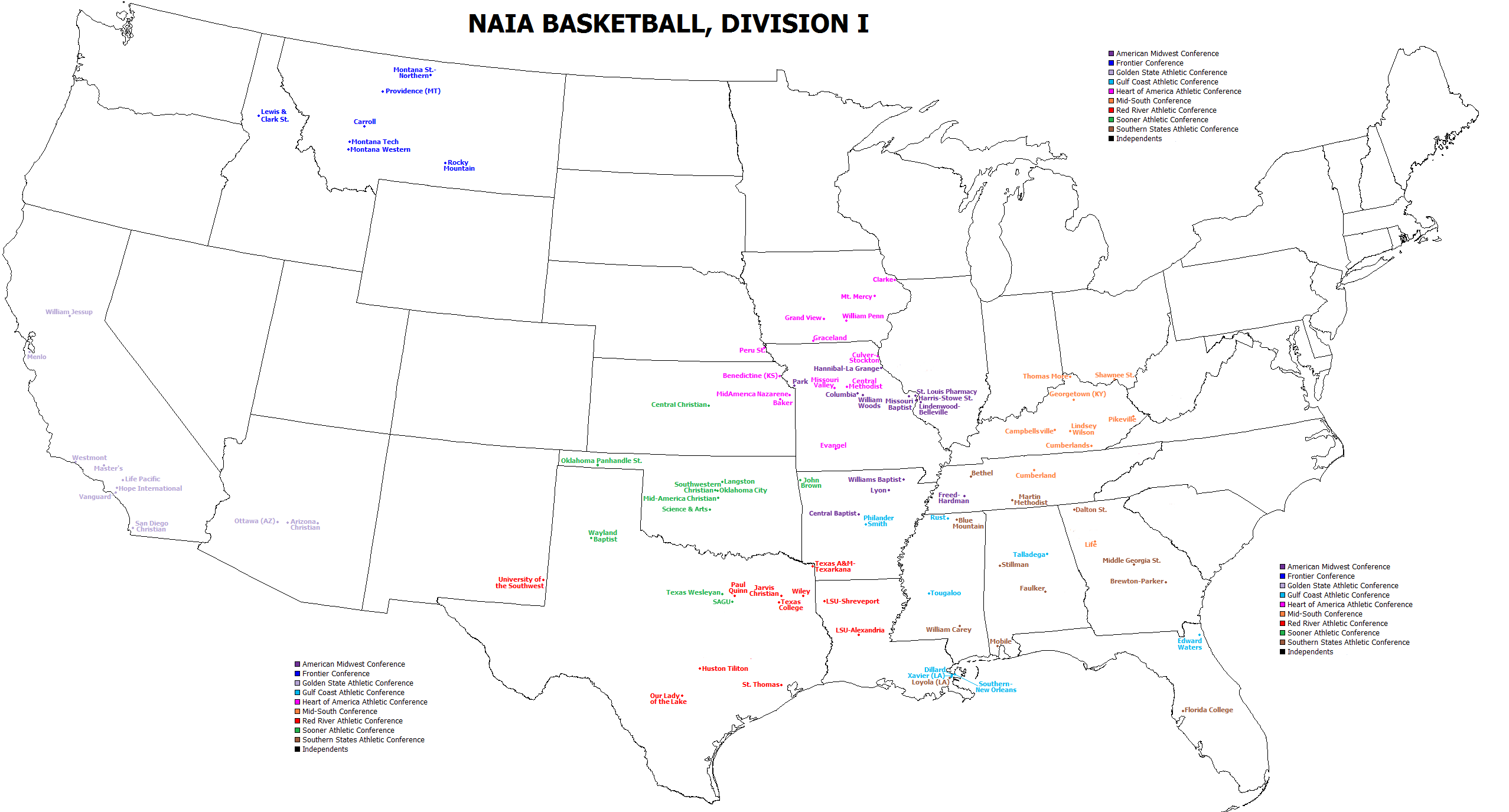
Map of NAIA Division I

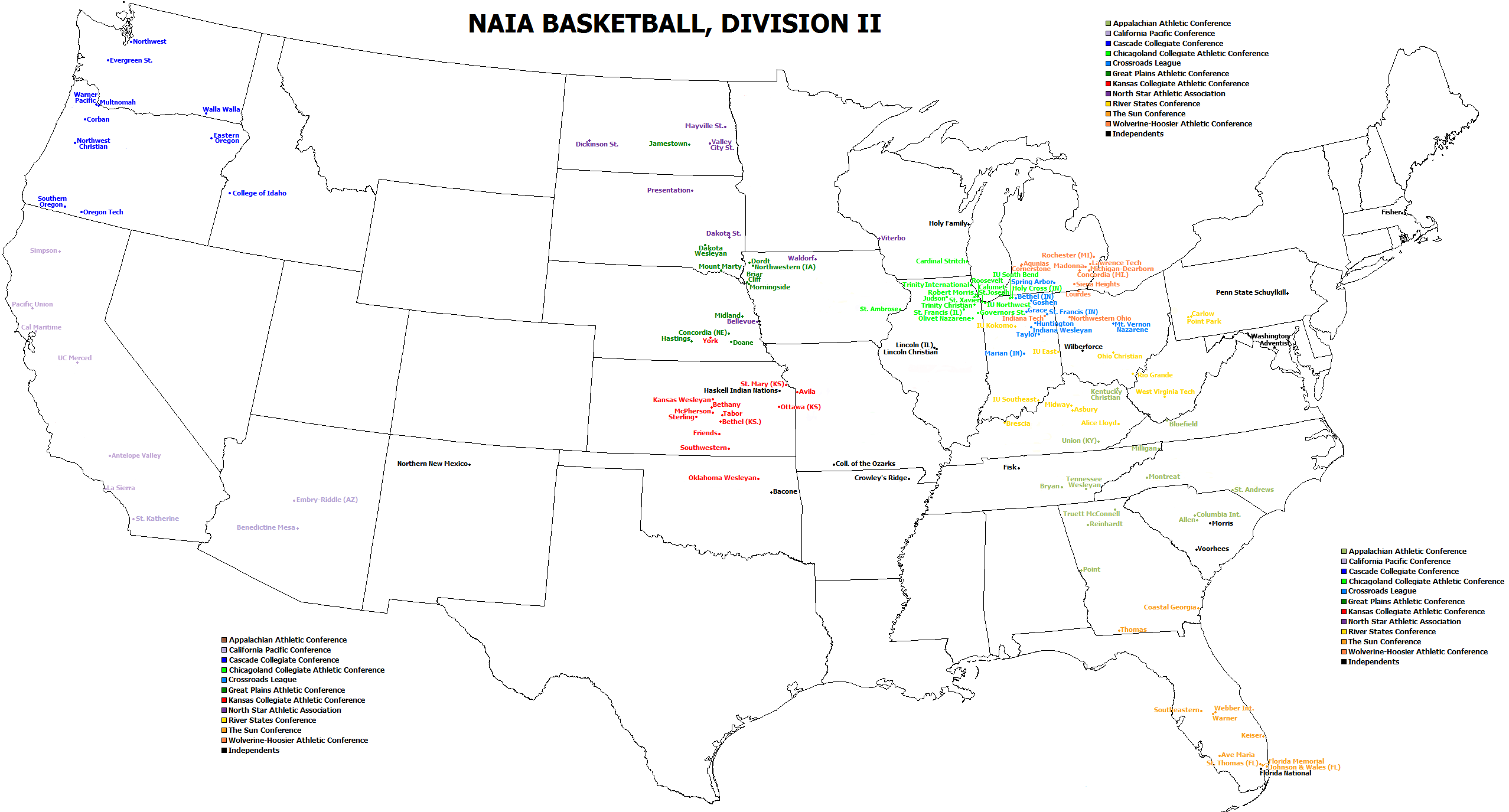
Map of NAIA Division II

- American Midwest Conference (AMC)
- Appalachian Athletic Conference (AAC)
- California Pacific Conference (CalPac)
- Cascade Collegiate Conference
- Chicagoland Collegiate Athletic Conference (CCAC)
- Continental Athletic Conference (CAC)
- Crossroads League (CL)
- Frontier Conference
- Great Plains Athletic Conference (GPAC)
- Great Southwest Athletic Conference (GSAC)
- HBCU Athletic Conference (HBCUAC)
- Heart of America Athletic Conference (HAAC)
- Kansas Collegiate Athletic Conference (KCAC)
- Mid-South Conference (MSC)
- Red River Athletic Conference (RRAC)
- River States Conference (RSC)
- Sooner Athletic Conference (SAC)
- Southern States Athletic Conference (SSAC)
- The Sun Conference (TSC)
- Wolverine–Hoosier Athletic Conference (WHAC)

=== National Christian College Athletic Association (NCCAA) Divisions I and II ===
- Central Region
- East Region
- Mid-East Region
- Mid-West Region
- North Central Region
- South Region
- Southwest Region
- West Region

=== National Junior College Athletic Association (NJCAA) Divisions I, II, and III ===
- Alabama Community College Conference
- Arizona Community College Athletic Conference
- Arrowhead Conference
- Bi-State Conference
- Carolinas Junior College Conference
- Colorado Community College Athletic Conference
- Eastern Pennsylvania Collegiate Conference
- Garden State Athletic Conference
- Georgia Junior College Athletic Association
- Great Rivers Athletic Conference
- Illinois Skyway Conference
- Iowa Community College Athletic Conference
- Kansas Jayhawk Community College Conference
- Maryland Junior College Athletic Conference
- Massachusetts Community College Athletic Association
- Metro Athletic Conference
- Michigan Community College Athletic Association
- Mid-Florida Conference
- Mid Hudson Conference
- Mid-State Athletic Conference
- Mid-West Athletic Conference
- Minnesota College Athletic Conference
- Mississippi Association of Community & Junior Colleges
- MISS-LOU Junior College Conference
- Missouri Community College Athletic Conference
- Mon-Dak Conference
- Mountain Valley Conference
- NJCAA Region 9
- North Central Community College Conference
- North Texas Junior College Athletic Conference
- Northeast Football Conference
- Ohio Community College Athletic Conference
- Panhandle Conference
- Pennsylvania Collegiate Athletic Association
- Scenic West Athletic Conference
- Southern Conference
- Southwest Junior College Conference
- Southwest Junior College Football Conference
- Suncoast Conference
- Tennessee Junior and Community College Athletic Association
- Western Junior College Athletic Conference
- Western New York Athletic Conference
- Western Pennsylvania Collegiate Conference
- Western States Football League
- Wyoming Community College Athletic Conference

=== California Community College Athletic Association (CCCAA) ===
- Bay Valley Conference
- Big 8 Conference (California)
- Central Valley Conference
- Coast Conference
- Foothill Athletic Conference
- Golden Valley Conference
- Orange Empire Conference
- Pacific Coast Athletic Conference (CCCAA)
- South Coast Conference
- Western State Conference

=== United States Collegiate Athletic Association (USCAA) ===
- Eastern Metro Athletic Conference
- Hudson Valley Intercollegiate Athletic Conference
- Northeastern Intercollegiate Athletics Conference
- Penn State University Athletic Conference
- Yankee Small College Conference

=== Northwest Athletic Conference (NWAC) ===
- Northern Region
- Southern Region
- Eastern Region
- Western Region

=== Association of Christian College Athletics (ACCA) ===
- Midwest Christian College Conference

=== Independent conferences ===
- Liga Atlética Interuniversitaria de Puerto Rico
- Manitoba Colleges Athletic Conference
- Northern Intercollegiate Athletic Conference
- Pacific Christian Athletic Conference
- Wisconsin Collegiate Conference

== Relationship to professional basketball ==
In past decades, the NBA held to tradition and drafted players who had graduated from college. This was a mutually beneficial relationship for the NBA and colleges—the colleges held onto players who would otherwise go professional, and the NBA did not have to fund a minor league. As the college game became commercialized, though, it became increasingly difficult for "student athletes" to be students. A growing number of poor, but highly talented, teenage basketball players found the system exploitative—they brought in funds to schools where they played without income. In July 2021, NIL has allowed college athletes to monetize their brands beyond their own school. This has been a point of discussion for whether or not students will opt to pro's early given their earning potential may be just as high or higher during their college years. The American Basketball Association began to employ players who had not yet graduated from college. After a season of junior college, a season at the University of Detroit, and an Olympic gold medal, Spencer Haywood played the 1969–70 season with the ABA's Denver Rockets. He signed with the NBA's Seattle SuperSonics in 1970, before his college class graduation, defying NBA rules. Haywood pleaded that, as his family's sole wage earner, he should be allowed to earn a living in the NBA or else his family would face destitution. The ensuing legal battle went to the U.S. Supreme Court which ruled in 1971 that the NBA does not have the same antitrust exemption enjoyed by Major League Baseball. Thereafter, collegiate players demonstrating economic hardship were allowed early entry into the NBA draft. The hardship requirement was eliminated in 1976.

In 1974, Moses Malone joined the Utah Stars of the American Basketball Association (which became part of the NBA after the ABA–NBA merger in 1976) straight out of high school and went on to a Hall of Fame career. The past 30 years had displayed a remarkable change in the college game. The best international players routinely skipped college entirely, many American stars passed up on college (Kevin Garnett, Kobe Bryant, Tracy McGrady, Dwight Howard, Amar'e Stoudemire, and LeBron James) or only played one year (Carmelo Anthony, Chris Bosh, Kevin Durant, and John Wall), and only a dozen or so college graduates were among the 60 players selected in the annual NBA draft. Fewer high schoolers were progressing directly to the NBA without at least one year of college basketball beginning in 2006; citing maturity concerns after several incidents involving young players, the labor agreement between players and owners now specifies that players must turn 19 years of age during the calendar year of the draft to be eligible. Additionally, U.S. players must be at least one year removed from their high school graduation.

The pervasiveness of college basketball throughout the nation, the large population of graduates from "major conference" universities, and the NCAA's marketing of "March Madness" (officially the NCAA Division I Men's Basketball Championship), have kept the college game alive and well. Some commentators have argued that the higher turnover of players has increased the importance of good coaches. Many teams have been highly successful, for instance, by emphasizing personality in their recruiting efforts, with the goal of creating a cohesive group that, while lacking stars, plays together for all four years and thus develops a higher level of sophistication than less stable teams could achieve.

College basketball remains more popular than the NBA in some regions of the United States, such as in North Carolina and the Midwest (where traditionally strong programs at Louisville, Kansas, and Indiana are found).

== Distinctions with NBA and WNBA play ==
The NCAA Men's Basketball Rules Committee, consisting of coaches from all three divisions of the NCAA, sets the rules for college men's basketball play. A parallel committee sets rules for college women's play. Although many of the NBA and WNBA rules apply in NCAA play, there are differences that make NCAA play unique.

As of the 2021–22 season, NCAA men's games are divided into two halves, each 20 minutes long; NBA games are played in four quarters of 12 minutes each; and WNBA and NCAA women's games are played in 10-minute quarters. The NCAA shot clock gives teams of both sexes 30 seconds to shoot, while the shot clock used in both the NBA and WNBA gives teams 24 seconds. Also, NCAA teams are allowed 10 seconds to move the ball past the halfcourt line (with this rule only having been added to the women's college game in the 2013–14 season), while NBA and WNBA rules allow only 8 seconds. However, like the NBA and WNBA (and high school basketball), during the last minute of each period, the game clock keeps time remaining in the period measured in tenths of a second, rather than full seconds.

Prior to the 2015–16 season, NCAA men's basketball used a 35-second shot clock, while NCAA women's basketball was played with the same 20-minute halves as the men's game.

Though the height of the basket, the foul line's distance from the backboard, and the court dimensions are the same, the distance between the three-point line and the backboard is different. The NBA three-point line measures 23 feet 9 inches (7.24 m) at the top of the circle, or 22 feet (6.7 m) in the corners or baseline. On the NCAA court, the three-point line had been a constant 19 feet 9 inches (6.02 m), but the NCAA Rules Committee voted in May 2007 to extend it a foot more to 20 feet 9 inches (6.32 m), which became effective beginning the 2008–09 season for men and the 2011–12 season for women. Effective in 2019–20, the NCAA adopted the current FIBA three-point arc of 6.75 m (22 ft 1 1/2 in) at the top of the circle and 6.6 m (21 ft 8 in) at the corners and baseline for Division I men's play, with Divisions II and III following in 2020–21. The previous college men's arc remained in use for women's play until 2021, with the FIBA arc first used on an experimental basis in the 2020 Women's National Invitation Tournament and Women's Basketball Invitational (which ultimately were not held). The WNBA's three-point line was 6.25 m (20 ft 6 in), which FIBA used before it extended its three-point arc to 6.75 m (22 ft 1 1/2 in) at the top of the circle and 6.6 m (21 ft 8 in) at the corners and baseline. The NCAA lane measures 12 feet (3.7 m) in width, while the NBA and WNBA lane is 16 feet (4.9 m); the FIBA lane is marginally wider than the NBA/WNBA lane at exactly 4.9 m (16 ft 1 in).

NCAA players are allowed five personal fouls before fouling out, as opposed to their NBA counterparts, who are allowed six. This maintains the same ratio of minutes of play per foul allowed, eight. However, the WNBA allows players six personal fouls despite playing the same number of minutes as the NCAA. The number of team fouls allotted is also different. In all three competitions, team fouls can be categorized as shooting or non-shooting. A shooting foul occurs when a player gets fouled in the act of shooting (while airborne), giving him the chance to shoot free throws. A common foul (non-shooting foul) consists of all other fouls, including making contact with the opposing player while "reaching in" to steal the ball.

A team may make a certain number of non-shooting fouls per period before the opposing team is awarded free throws. In the NBA, WNBA, and (since 2015–16) NCAA women's basketball, the fifth team foul in a quarter places the team in penalty. For every foul starting with the fifth, whether shooting or non-shooting, the opposing team receives two free throws. In addition, if an NBA or WNBA team has not entered the penalty in the last two minutes of a period, its team foul count is reset; the second team foul in the last two minutes triggers the penalty. In the NCAA men's game, the penalty begins with the seventh team foul in a half. However, the fouled player must make the first free throw in order to get the second. This is called a "one-and-one" or "one and the bonus" situation. On the tenth team foul, the "double bonus" situation comes into play, meaning that every subsequent team foul results in two free throws for the opposing team. No free throws are shot at either level for a player control foul, which is an offensive foul (usually a charge). Unlike NBA/WNBA rules, the team foul count does not reset in the last two minutes of a half (men's) or quarter (women's). Overtime periods are considered an extension of the second half under NCAA men's rules and the fourth quarter under NCAA women's rules, but not under NBA/WNBA rules; in those leagues, the fourth team foul in any overtime period, or the second in the last two minutes, triggers the penalty.

When a dispute over ball possession arises, the jump ball is used in the NBA and WNBA. In the NCAA, once the first possession has been established from the opening tip, no further jump balls occur except to begin an overtime period. Since 1981, a possession arrow on the scorer's table has dictated which team should possess the ball, with the arrow switching directions after each use.

Either team in NCAA play can call a timeout after a made basket; in the NBA and WNBA, only the opposing team can call a timeout after a basket is made. From the 2015–16 season through 2018–19, NCAA men's coaches were banned from calling timeouts from the bench while the ball is live at any time in the game; from 2019 to 2020, they are again allowed to call such timeouts, but only during the last 2 minutes of any period (half or overtime). Players have not been subject to this restriction.

In addition, the NBA limits what types of defense a team can play, primarily in an effort to prevent coaches from slowing down the pace of the game by using zone defenses. Zone defense is permitted in the NBA and WNBA; however, players cannot stand in the lane for more than three seconds if they are not guarding anyone. In NCAA basketball, no such restriction exists, and coaches are free to design a variety of defensive techniques.

In college basketball, it is required by rule that the home team wears their white or light-colored jerseys while the visiting team wears their darker jersey color. The NBA, like most other professional sports leagues, lets the home team decide which uniform to wear, but with a few exceptions the home team has continued the tradition of the college game and wears white (or in the case of the Los Angeles Lakers for non-Sunday home games, gold) at home. Since the 2017–18 season, the NBA only requires that road teams wear colors that contrast sufficiently with the home team's choice, meaning that "color on color" games are now possible. This is for regular season play only; home teams always wear white during the playoffs. The WNBA, however, follows the college rule for all games.

The NBA introduced a new dress code rule in 2005. Now players are required to wear business casual attire whenever they are engaged in team or league business. This includes a long or short-sleeved dress shirt (collared or turtleneck), and/or a sweater; dress slacks, khaki pants, or dress jeans, and appropriate shoes and socks, including dress shoes, dress boots, or other presentable shoes, but not including sneakers, sandals, flip-flops, or work boots. The WNBA has a similar dress code, adjusted for standard women's attire. NCAA rules have no set dress code rule, leaving it up to individual teams or conferences. Many players will wear team-issued clothing when entering/exiting the arena or not dressed to play; indeed, the terms of an individual school's deal with an athletic apparel manufacturer may require players to be in branded clothing during all public appearances.

The organizations also long had different rules for jersey numbers. While the NBA and WNBA allow players to wear any number from 0 to 99, including 00, so long as it is available, until 2024 the NCAA disallowed any jersey number with a 6, 7, 8, or 9 in it. This was done to allow the referee to report fouls using hand signals with one hand, as each hand has only five fingers. High school basketball, whose rules are set by the National Federation of State High School Associations, continues to follow the old NCAA rule and only permits numbers 0 through 5 to be used.

== Other divisions ==
While less commercialized than Division I, Division II and Division III are both highly successful college basketball organizations. Women's Division I is often televised, but to smaller audiences than Men's Division I. Generally, small colleges join Division II, while colleges of all sizes that choose not to offer athletic scholarships join Division III. Games other than NCAA D-I are rarely televised by national media, although CBS televises the Championship Final of NCAA Division II, while CBS College Sports Network televises the semifinals as well as the Division III Final.

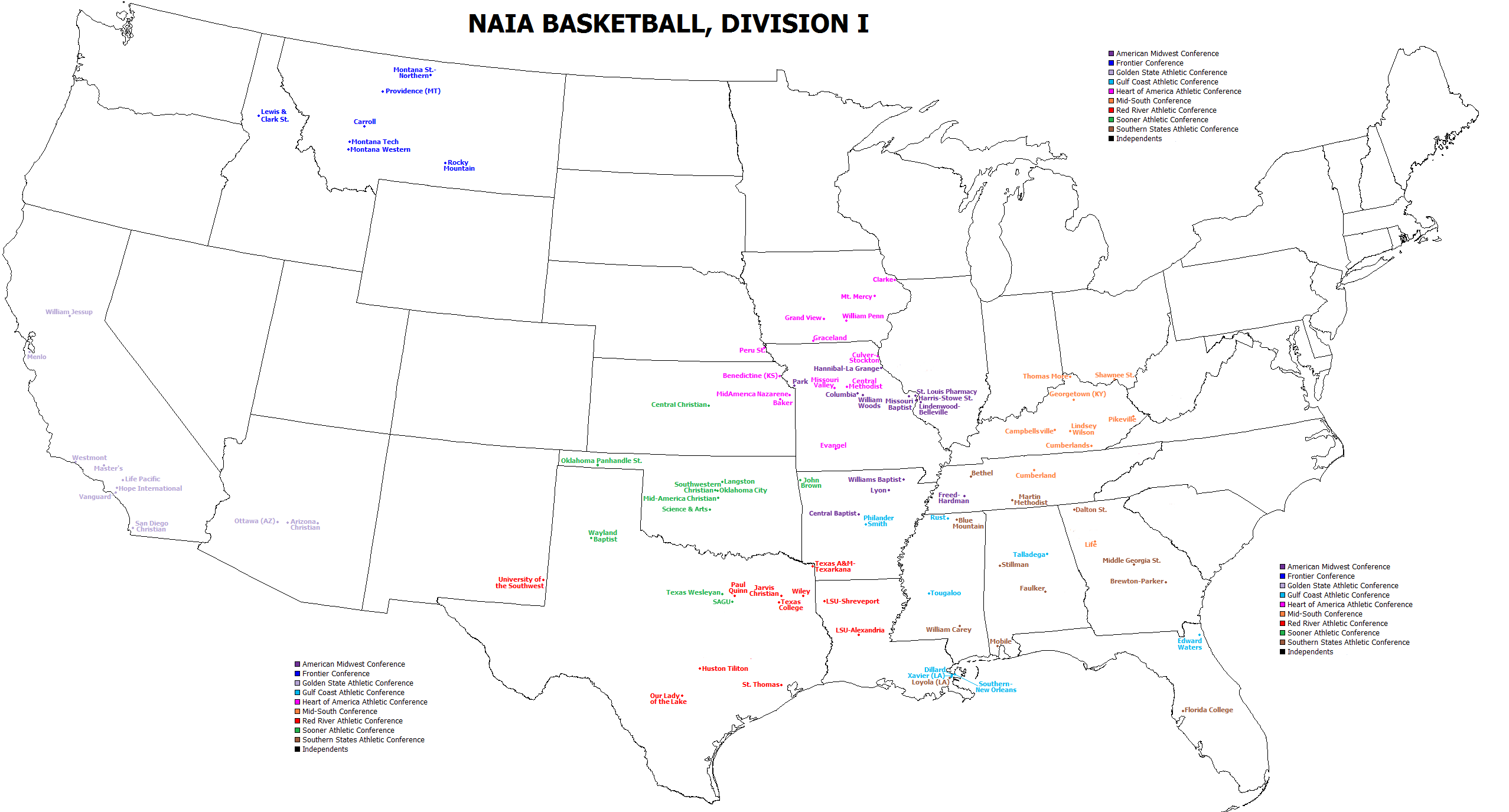
A map of all NAIA Division I basketball teams.

The NAIA also sponsors men and women's college-level basketball. The NAIA Men's Basketball National Championship has been held annually since 1937 (with the exception of 1944 and 2020), when it was established by James Naismith to crown a national champion for smaller colleges and universities. Unlike the NCAA Tournament, the NAIA Tournament features only 32 teams, and the entire tournament is contested in one week instead of three weekends. Since 2002 the NAIA National Tournament has been played in Municipal Auditorium in Kansas City, Missouri. (in 1994–2001 it was held in Tulsa, Oklahoma, and 1937–1999 it was held at Municipal then Kemper Arena in Kansas City). Media coverage has sporadically been provided by CBS, the Victory Sports Network, and various lesser-known media.

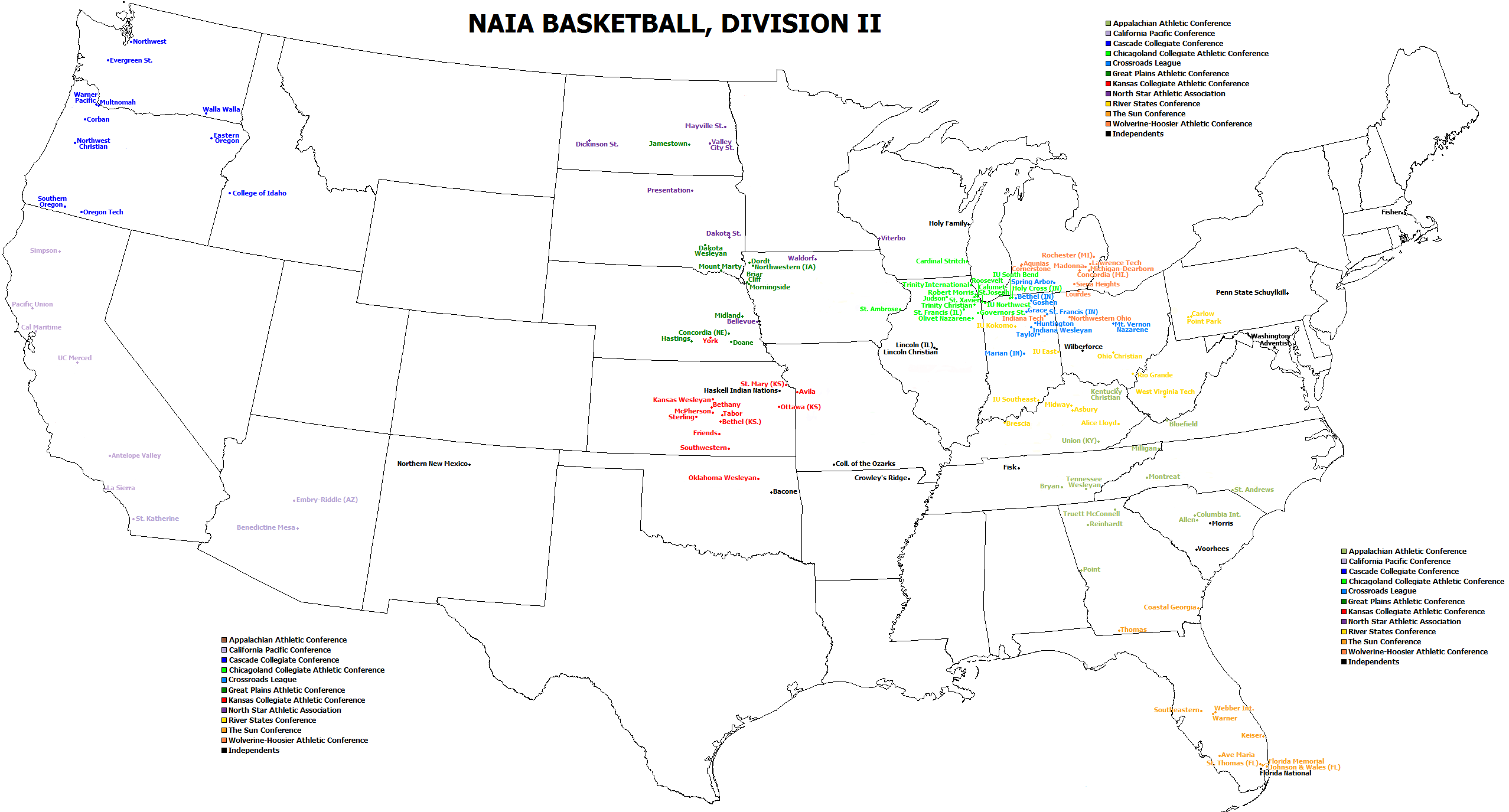
Map of NAIA Division II basketball teams.

From 1992 to 2020, the NAIA sponsored a Division II championship, similar to the NCAA Division I and II. There is also an NAIA Women's Basketball Championship, which was also split into Divisions I and II through the 2019–20 season. From 2020 to 2021, the NAIA will adopt a single-division format for basketball, with the men's and women's tournaments featuring 64 teams each. In both tournaments, the first two rounds will be held at 16 regional sites, with only the winner at each site advancing to the final tournament site.

The only school to have won national titles in both the NAIA and NCAA Division I is Louisville; the Cardinals have also won the NIT title. Southern Illinois has won NAIA and NIT titles. Central Missouri and Fort Hays State have won NAIA and NCAA Division II national titles. Indiana State has won an NAIA title and finished as the National Runner-Up in the NAIA (twice), in NCAA Division II (once) and NCAA Division I (once).

== Awards ==
- Men's college basketball awards
- Women's college basketball awards
- National Collegiate Basketball Hall of Fame
- Sporting News College Basketball Athlete of the Decade (2000–09)

== Records and lists ==
=== Men's ===
- List of teams with the most victories in NCAA Division I men's college basketball
- List of college men's basketball coaches with 600 wins
- NCAA Division I Men's Final Four appearances by school
- List of NCAA Division I Men's Final Four appearances by coach
- NCAA Division I Men's Final Four appearances by school
- NCAA Division I men's basketball tournament all-time team records
- NCAA Division I men's basketball tournament bids by school
- NCAA Division I men's basketball tournament bids by school and conference
- NCAA Division I men's basketball tournament records
- NAIA Men's Basketball Championships
- NIT all-time team records
- NIT bids by school and conference
- NIT championships and semifinal appearances
- NCAA Division I Men's basketball statistical leaders
- List of current NCAA Division I men's basketball coaches

=== Women's ===
- NCAA Division I Women's Tournament bids by school
- NAIA Women's Basketball Championships
- AIAW Women's Basketball Champions
- List of NCAA Division I women's basketball career scoring leaders

== See also ==
- NCAA Division I men's basketball alignment history
- Association for Intercollegiate Athletics for Women (AIAW)
- AIAW women's basketball tournament
- Black participation in college basketball
- Women's basketball#University
- College rivalries
- U Sports men's basketball, highest level at Canadian universities
- U Sports women's basketball, highest level at Canadian universities
- Canadian Collegiate Athletic Association (CCAA)
- College basketball in the Philippines
- University Basketball League Australia
