= Dave Pasiak =

Coaching career (HC unless noted)
- 1984–1988: Waterville High JV
- 1988–1989: Sauquoit Valley High
- 1989–1991: Colgate University (Asst.)
- 1991–1993: Herkimer County Community College
- 1993–1994: Brookfield High
- 1994–1998: Westmoreland High
- 1999–2000: Frankfort-Schuyler High
- 2000–2015: Onondaga Community College
- 2016–2017: Morrisville State College (Asst.)
- 2017-present: Vermont State University Lyndon

Head coaching record
- Overall: 314-340

Accomplishments and honors

Championships
- Mid-State Athletic Conference (2007)

Awards
- NJCAA Division III Region III Coach of the Year (2003); Mid-State Athletic Conference Coach of the Year (2002, 2003, 2008)

Records
- All-time wins leader at Onondaga Community College (264); Best single-season winning percentage as an NCAA Division III program at Vermont State University Lyndon (.500 in 2020-2021)

David Pasiak is currently the head men's basketball coach and sports information director at Vermont State University Lyndon. He was named to those positions in September, 2017. Previously he was the head men's basketball coach at Onondaga Community College from August 2000 through December, 2015. He had a career record of 264–198 in 15+ seasons at OCC and 283–236 overall in 17+ seasons at the NJCAA level. Pasiak is actively involved in Coaches vs. Cancer. In his seventh season as head coach at OCC, he earned his 150th victory at the NJCAA level and in the process became Onondaga's all-time winningest coach (OCC Athletics). He also served as Onondaga's interim athletic director from November 2009 to August 2011, and served as associate athletic director until leaving the college in 2015. He was named Mid-State Athletic Conference Coach of the Year in 2002, 2003 and 2008. He was the NJCAA Region III Division III Coach of the Year in 2003. Pasiak guided his 2006–2007 team to the school's first Mid-State Athletic Conference championship in 15 years.

== Coaching career ==
=== High school ===
Pasiak enrolled in Clarkson University in 1980, and was a member of the university's basketball team. He graduated in 1984 (OCC Athletics) and began his coaching career at his alma mater, Waterville High School, where he was the head coach of the boys junior varsity team. Soon thereafter he was hired as the varsity boys basketball coach at Sauquoit Valley High School.

=== College ===
After one season he had the opportunity to coach at the collegiate level and joined newly hired Jack Bruen's Colgate staff as an assistant. To this day Pasiak calls Bruen his favorite mentor. "I always said if I could be half the coach and a quarter of the man that he was then I'd be okay," said Pasiak in a 2007 interview.

Following a two-year stint at Colgate, Pasiak took his first head coaching job at the collegiate level in 1991. He was the head coach at Herkimer County Community College for two seasons. Herkimer had won the NJCAA Men's Division III Basketball Championship, the year prior to Pasiak's arrival, led by longtime Coach Jack Alofs who retired with a coaching record of over 500 wins.

Pasiak took over and returned only two players from the championship team, neither of whom would finish the season. In Pasiak's first season the Generals finished 6–21. The next year they improved to 13–17. However, another off-court incident, this one involving a player being severely beaten, led to Pasiak's departure from Herkimer.

Pasiak stated in a 2007 interview that the president of the college did not like the fact that Pasiak had gone to the hospital to visit said player and had accompanied the player to his court testimony. "The reason I didn't stay at Herkimer was a direct result of that aftermath. We could have won the national title and I wouldn't have been back at Herkimer. But if that happened again I'd do the same thing," said Pasiak.

=== Return to high school ===
After Herkimer, Pasiak returned to the high school level as varsity head coach of Brookfield High School in Upstate New York. He stayed for one season then took the varsity coaching position at Westmoreland High School. He stayed on as coach of the Bulldogs for four seasons, his longest tenure until he reached OCC.

Pasiak left coaching in the late 1990s to become athletic director at Frankfort-Schuyler High School. His absence from coaching would be short-lived. After one year he stepped in as acting varsity head coach when head coach Jim Babcock took a personal leave of absence.

=== Onondaga Community College ===
While serving as AD of Frankfort-Schuyler, Pasiak was approached by new Onondaga Community College athletic director Bob McKenney about the head coaching job at the college. Pasiak accepted the job just a few weeks prior to the start of the 2000–2001 school year. With no time to recruit, he inherited a team with only two returning players and minimal experience among the newcomers. After getting off to an 0–11 start, Pasiak guided the team to a remarkable turnaround, as they won 12 of their last 17 regular season games, finished third in the Mid-State Athletic Conference, and qualified for the conference playoffs for the first time in several seasons.

In 2001–02, after starting 1–8 against one of Region III's most demanding schedules, Pasiak guided the team to 16 wins in their final 19 regular season games. The Lazers finished the season 18–13, 11–3 in Mid-State Athletic Conference play, and qualified for post-season play, reaching the Mid-State Championship game, and the Region III Division III quarter-finals. The Lazers also achieved notoriety for their offensive outbursts, as they ended the season as the top scoring team in NJCAA Division III play. As a result, Coach Pasiak was recognized as the Mid-State Athletic Conference Coach of the Year.

In 2002–03, Pasiak guided the Lazers to a final record of 23–7, the second best in school history. Onondaga's regular season mark of 23–5 was the best ever at the school. The Lazers spent five weeks as an honorable mention selection in the NJCAA Division III national poll. They finished 12–2 in Mid-State play and qualified for the conference playoffs. Onondaga reached the Region III Division III quarterfinals and finished 8th nationally in scoring offense. For these accomplishments, Pasiak was named the Region III Coach of the Year, and was also named the Mid-State Athletic Conference Coach of the Year for the second consecutive year.

In 2003–04, under Pasiak's direction the Lazers finished with an overall record of 21–11, and a Mid-State record of 9–5. The Lazers qualified for the conference playoffs and for the Region III tournament. They reached the Mid-State Championship game, and won two post-season contests for the first time since 1994. Onondaga also received honorable mention in the NJCAA Division III national poll and finished 10th nationally in scoring offense.

In 2004–05, Pasiak directed Onondaga to an overall record of 17–13, and a Mid-State record of 7–7. The Lazers rebounded from an 0–4 start in conference play to qualify for the conference playoffs and for the Region III tournament. Onondaga also finished 9th nationally in scoring offense.

In 2005–06, Pasiak directed Onondaga to an overall record of 17–12, and a Mid-State record of 7–7. The Lazers finished the regular season by winning 7 of their last 8 games to qualify for the Region III tournament for the fifth straight year. Onondaga also finished 2nd nationally in scoring offense, the sixth consecutive year that they had finished in the top ten in that category.

In 2006–07, Onondaga won the Mid-State Athletic Conference Tournament for the first time since 1992, the year prior to the program's sole national championship. They were the host team for the tourney as they had won the regular season title with a record of 12–2. The Lazers also qualified for the Region III tournament for the sixth straight season, losing in the quarterfinals to Clinton Community College. OCC finished with a 23–8 record, earning Pasiak his third 20-win season in five years.

In 2007–08, Onondaga shared the Mid-State Athletic Conference Regular Season Championship with Broome Community College. Broome received the top seed in the MSAC Tournament and defeated Onondaga in the championship game, denying Onondaga's bid for back to back championships. Onondaga finished the season with a 22–9 record, falling to SUNY Cobleskill in the Region III quarter-finals. Pasiak was named the Mid-State Athletic Conference Coach of the Year for the 3rd time.

Onondaga qualified for post-season in both 2008–09 and 2009–2010. In 2009, the Lazers finished 14–16, reaching the MSAC semi-finals and the Region III quarterfinals. In 2010, Onondaga won 5 of its last 6 conference games to earn the #3 seed in the MSAC Tournament, where they fell to Broome Community College. Onondaga closed the 2009–2010 season with a 10–19 overall record.

In 2010–2011, Onondaga finished the season with an overall record of 20–10. The Lazers posted a 9–3 record in MSAC play, finishing second in the regular season standings and earning the #2 seed in the MSAC Tournament. Onondaga reached the MSAC semi-finals, where they fell to Broome Community College, and the NJCAA Region III quarter-finals, where they were defeated by Finger Lakes Community College.

Onondaga completed the 2011–2012 season with an overall record of 17–14, and a Mid-State Athletic Conference of 7–5. The Lazers reached the MSAC championship game, falling to Cayuga Community College. Onondaga was the #7 seed in the NJCAA Region III tournament, where their season was ended in the quarter-finals by SUNY Delhi, the eventual regional champion. The 2011–2012 team was the top scoring team in Region III, and ranked 7th nationally in scoring offense.

Onondaga continued its run of post-season appearances under Pasiak with appearances in both the MSAC quarterfinals and NJCAA Region III tournament in 2012–2013, the regional tournament in 2013–2014, and the MSAC semi-finals in 2014–2015. In each of those seasons Onondaga was the only MSAC team to defeat the eventual conference champion during that season.

In 15 full seasons as head coach at Onondaga, Pasiak guided the Lazers to postseason berths, either in the MSAC or NJCAA Region III tournaments, in each season (OCC Athletics). During his tenure, the Lazers have appeared in five MSAC championship games (2002, 2004, 2007, 2008, & 2012).

Pasiak has also been named Mid-State Athletic Conference Coach of the Year three times, and was recognized as Region III Coach of the Year in 2003.

Pasiak was removed as OCC men's basketball coach as of December 22, 2015 amid "unspecified allegations of misconduct." A notice of claim filed by Pasiak against OCC in February, 2016, indicated that he was terminated for refusing to recruit based on race. Pasiak and OCC reached a settlement in the case in October 2017.

=== Morrisville State College ===
Pasiak accepted a position as the Assistant Director of the Collegiate Science and Technology Entry Program at Morrisville State College in August 2016. He also served as an Assistant Men's Basketball Coach for the Mustangs. Morrisville completed the 2016–2017 season with a 22–7 record, winning the North Eastern Athletic Conference championship and advancing to the NCAA Division III Tournament.

=== Vermont State University Lyndon (formerly Lyndon State College & Northern Vermont University-Lyndon) ===
Pasiak was named the Head Men's Basketball Coach and Sports Information Director at Lyndon State College in September 2017. (Lyndon State became Northern Vermont University-Lyndon in July 2018, and in turn became Vermont State University Lyndon in July 2023.) He succeeded Chris Dorsey, who left Lyndon in the summer of 2017 to become the Head Men's Basketball Coach at Centenary College of Louisiana. Pasiak won his 300th game as a college head coach in March 2021.

In the 2020-2021 season, which was abbreviated due to the COVID-19 pandemic, Pasiak led NVU-Lyndon to a 5-5 record, its best since the program rejoined the NCAA in 2008. In 2022, NVU-Lyndon qualified for the North Atlantic Conference playoffs for the first time since 2017. The Hornets defeated Maine Maritime Academy in the first round, before falling to eventual champion Husson University in the conference quarterfinals. Lyndon earned their second consecutive playoff berth in 2023, falling in the NAC quarterfinals to top seed University of Maine at Farmington.

=== Collegiate record ===
Record table
Season	Team	Overall	Conference	Standing	Postseason
Herkimer County Community College (Mountain Valley Conference) (1991–1993)
1991–1992	Herkimer	6–21			—
1992–1993	Herkimer	13–17			—
Herkimer:		19–38	N/A		
Onondaga Community College (Mid-State Athletic Conference) (2000–2015)
2000–2001	Onondaga	12–17	9–5	T3rd	MSAC Semifinal
2001–2002	Onondaga	18–13	11–3	2nd	MSAC Final, Regional Quarterfinal
2002–2003	Onondaga	23–7	12–2	2nd	MSAC Semifinal, Regional Quarterfinal
2003–2004	Onondaga	21–11	9–5	2nd	MSAC Final, Regional Quarterfinal
2004–2005	Onondaga	17–13	7–7	4th	MSAC Semifinal, Regional 1st Round
2005–2006	Onondaga	17–12	7–7	6th	Regional 1st Round
2006–2007	Onondaga	23–8	12–2	1st	MSAC Champion, Regional Quarterfinal
2007–2008	Onondaga	22–9	9–3	T1st	MSAC Final, Regional Quarterfinal
2008–2009	Onondaga	14–16	7–5	3rd	MSAC Semifinal, Regional Quarterfinal
2009–2010	Onondaga	10–19	6–6	T3rd	MSAC Semifinal
2010–2011	Onondaga	20–10	9–3	2nd	MSAC Semifinal, Regional Quarterfinal
2011–2012	Onondaga	17–14	7–5	T2nd	MSAC Final, Regional Quarterfinal
2012–2013	Onondaga	15–14	5–7	5th	MSAC Quarterfinal, Regional First Round
2013–2014	Onondaga	10–19	4–8	T5th	Regional First Round
2014–2015	Onondaga	16–13	8–4	4th	MSAC Semifinal
2015–2016	Onondaga	9–3			
Onondaga:		264–198	122–72		
Vermont State University Lyndon (North Atlantic Conference) (2017–present)
2017–2018	Lyndon State	2–24	2–16	10th	
2018–2019	NVU-Lyndon	4–21	2–12	T7th	
2019–2020	NVU-Lyndon	7–18	4–10	7th	
2020–2021	NVU-Lyndon	5–5			
2021–2022	NVU-Lyndon	7–18	3-9	5th East Division	NAC Quarterfinal
2022–2023	NVU-Lyndon	6-20	3-11	4th East Division	NAC Quarterfinal
Lyndon:		31-104	14-58		
Total:		311–340			
National champion Postseason invitational champion Conference regular season champion Conference regular season and conference tournament champion Division regular season champion Division regular season and conference tournament champion Conference tournament champion

== Personal ==
Pasiak is an advocate of “Coaches vs. Cancer” and participates in the annual "white sneaker day". He is also a past President of the Basketball Coaches Association of New York, and is a member of the National Association of Basketball Coaches. He is a 1984 graduate of Clarkson University and resides in Lyndonville, Vermont.

== Accomplishments ==
Some of Pasiak's notable accomplishments:

- Led Onondaga to the 2007 MSAC championship
- Led Onondaga to 13 MSAC tournament appearances, 5 MSAC championship appearances, and 12 NJCAA Region III tournament berths
- Three-time MSAC Coach of the Year (2002, 2003, 2008)
- 2003 NJCAA Region III Coach of the Year
- In 15 seasons at Onondaga, has compiled five 20-win seasons
- Led Lyndon to its best record as an NCAA Division III program in 2020-2021
