= Hudson Valley Intercollegiate Athletic Conference =

- Conference: USCAA
- Founded: 2004
- Commissioner: Vacant
- Sports fielded: 13; men's: 6; women's: 7
- No. of teams: 5
- Headquarters: New York City, New York
- Region: New York

The Hudson Valley Intercollegiate Athletic Conference (HVIAC) is a member conference of the United States Collegiate Athletic Association (USCAA). It consists of five small colleges in New York State. HVIAC's first championships were held in the 2004–05 season. Similar to NCAA Division III rules, HVIAC membership is open to four-year higher education institutions that offer no athletic financial aid.

== Member schools ==
=== Current members ===
| Institution | Location (Note: All cities are located within the State of New York.) | Founded | Affiliation | Enrollment | Nickname | Joined |
|---|---|---|---|---|---|---|
| Berkeley College | New York City | 1931 | For-profit | 8,900 | Knights | 2004? |
| Five Towns College | Dix Hills | 1972 | Nonsectarian | 750 | Sound | 2004? |
| State University of New York; College of Environmental Science and Forestry (SUNY ESF) | Syracuse | 1911 | Public | 2,227 | Mighty Oaks | 2004? |
| Davis College | Johnson City | 1900 | Baptist | 441 | Huskies | 2004? |
| Villa Maria College | Buffalo | 1960 | Catholic (C.S.S.F.) | 544 | Vikings | 2022 |

=== Former members ===
| Institution | Location (Note: All cities are located within the State of New York.) | Founded | Affiliation | Enrollment | Nickname | Joined | Left | Current conference |
|---|---|---|---|---|---|---|---|---|
| Albany College of Pharmacy and Health Sciences | Albany | 1881 | Nonsectarian | 1,384 | Panthers | 2004 | 2019 | Yankee (YSCC) |
| College of New Rochelle | New Rochelle | 1904 | Catholic (Ursulines) | N/A | Blue Angels | 2004 | 2019 | N/A (Note: CNR was merged into Mercy College in 2019.) |
| The Culinary Institute of America | Hyde Park | 1946 | Nonsectarian (Culinary) | 2,880 | Steels | 2004 | 2023 | |
| King's College | New York City | 1938 | Non-denominational | 400 | Lions | 2004 | 2023 | Closed 2025 |
| Pratt Institute | Brooklyn | 1877 | Nonsectarian | 4,829 | Cannoneers | 2004 | 2018 | Atlantic East (Note: Currently an NCAA Division III athletic conference.) |
| St. Joseph's University (Brooklyn Campus) (Note: St. Joseph's was a college during its stint as a member.) | Brooklyn | 1916 | Catholic (C.S.J.) | 1,261 | Bears | 2004 | 2015 | Skyline |
| Vaughn College | Flushing | 1932 | Nonsectarian (Space grant) | 1,812 | Warriors | 2004 | 2023 | USCAA Independent |
| Webb Institute | Glen Cove | 1889 | Nonsectarian | 90 | Webbies | 2004 | 2023 | USCAA Independent |

== Sports ==
Conference sports
| Sport | Men's | Women's |
|---|---|---|
| Basketball | ✓ | ✓ |
| Cross country | ✓ | ✓ |
| Soccer | ✓ | ✓ |
| Tennis | ✓ | ✓ |
| Volleyball | ✓ | ✓ |

== See also ==
- Mid Hudson Conference
- Penn State University Athletic Conference
- State University of New York Athletic Conference
- Yankee Small College Conference
