= Columbia–Greene Community College =

Public college in Hudson, New York, US

Columbia-Greene Community College
- Motto: Tomorrow, Today
- Type: Public community college
- Established: 1966; 60 years ago
- Parent institution: State University of New York
- President: Victoria Walsh
- Undergraduates: 1,581 (fall 2025)
- Location: Hudson, New York, U.S.
- Campus: Rural, 144 acres (58 ha)
- Colors: Green, orange, yellow
- Nickname: Twins
- Sporting affiliations: NJCAA, Region III
- Mascot: Rip van Winkle
- Website: www.columbiagreene.edu

Columbia–Greene Community College (Co-Greene or C-GCC) is a public community college in Hudson, New York. Founded in 1966, it is part of the State University of New York (SUNY) system and is locally sponsored by two rural counties, Columbia and Greene, which have a combined population of about 112,000. The college was originally in Athens, New York until its permanent relocation to the City of Hudson in 1974. It currently offers 32 associate degree programs and five undergraduate certificate programs. C-GCC is accredited by the Middle States Commission on Higher Education and enrolls approximately 1,578 students as of Fall 2018.

== History ==
Original location of Columbia-Greene Community College in the town of Athens

=== Early beginnings ===
In early 1966, the Columbia County Board of Supervisors together with the Greene County Legislature established a steering committee to determine the feasibility of jointly sponsoring a community college. By the end of the year, the SUNY Board of Trustees and the New York State Board of Regents granted initial funding and a charter to support the establishment of the college.

Columbia–Greene Community College officially opened its doors in September 1969 to a class of 350 full-time and part-time students under the leadership of the college's first president, Edward J. Owen. Two years later, C-GCC awarded 35 associate degrees to its first graduating class during a small ceremony at Catskill High School. For its first five years, the college operated out of an old schoolhouse in Athens, New York. The college received full accreditation status by the Middle States Commission on Higher Education in 1975.

=== Campus relocation and expansion ===
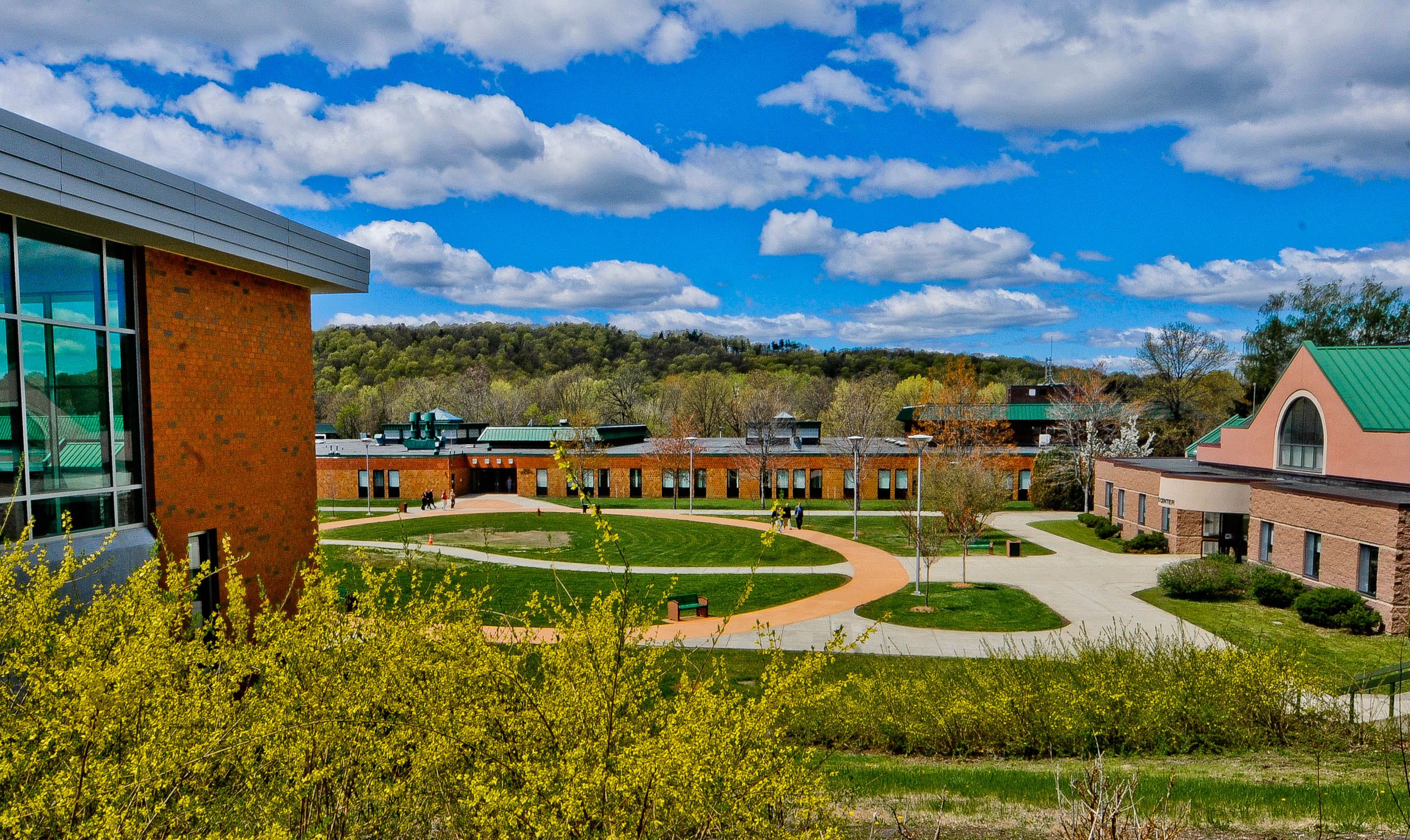
Current location of Columbia-Greene Community College in the town of Greenport

In 1974, the Columbia-Greene campus was permanently relocated to a 130,000 sq. ft. building, now referred to as the Main Building, in the Town of Greenport just outside the City of Hudson. In addition to expanded instructional spaces and administrative offices, the Main Building also included a two-story library, a gymnasium, fitness center, and a cafeteria.

In the spring of 1982, former President of the United States Gerald Ford was invited to the campus as the keynote speaker for a fundraising dinner hosted by the Columbia-Greene Community Foundation.

Columbia-Greene underwent its first expansion in June 1989 by adding three new buildings, including a new Technology Center which would house the expanding automotive technology program, an Arts Center which would contain the college's first performing arts theatre, as well as a Day Care Center which would provide child care support for attending students.

In 2018, Columbia–Greene Community College began its first expansion project in decades by adding the New Construction Technology Program building on its main campus.

== Academics ==
The college offers 38 academic degree and certificate programs under the Divisions of Arts & Humanities, Behavioral and Social Sciences, Math and Science, Nursing, and Technology.

== Athletics ==
C-GCC offers intercollegiate and intramural sports programs. It is a member of the National Junior College Athletic Association (NJCAA) Region III, and the Mountain Valley Athletic Conference where CGCC competes at the Division III level.

== Notable alumni ==
- Mickey Brantley, former Major League Baseball player
