= Villa Maria College =

Catholic college in Buffalo, New York, US

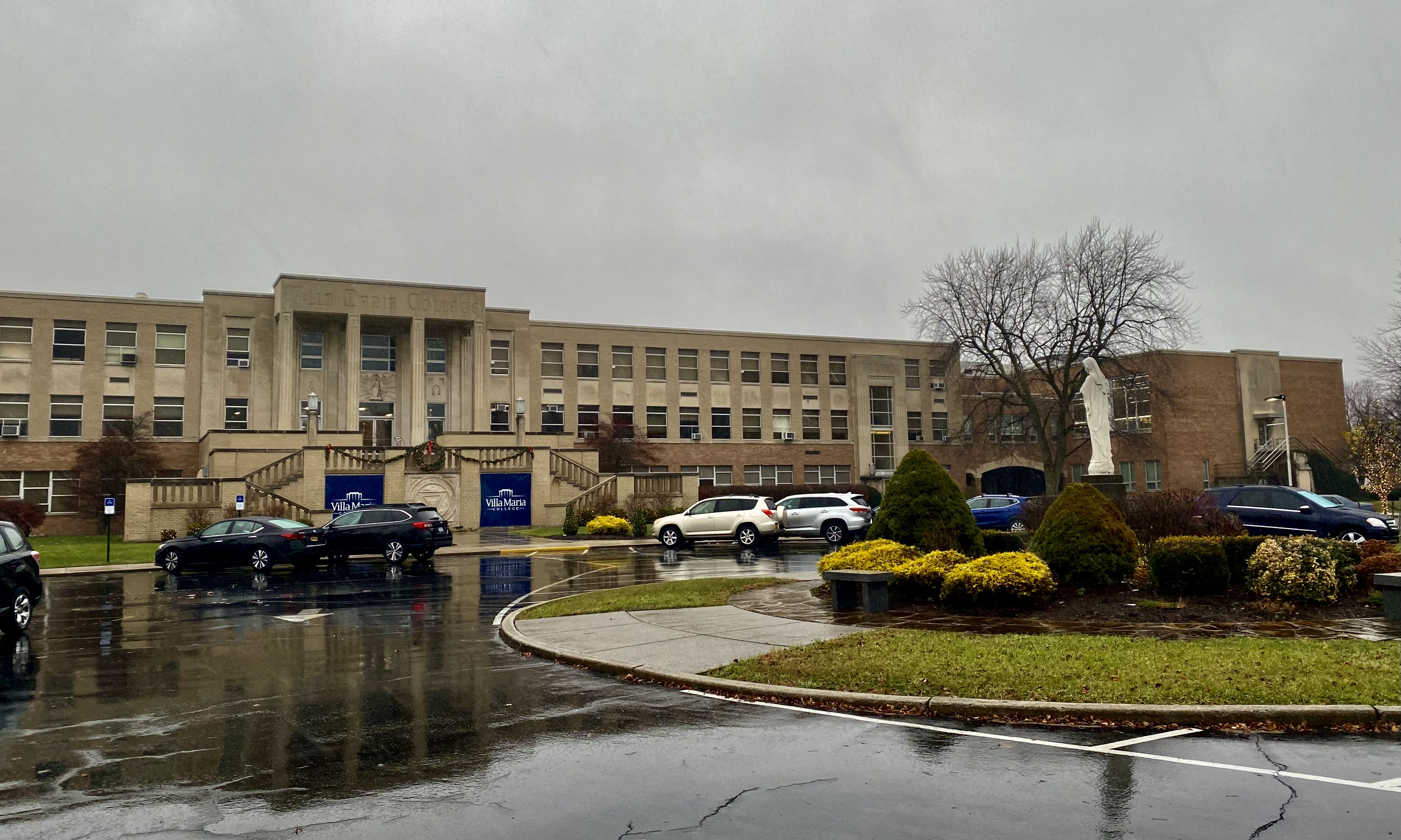
- Latin: Villae Mariae Buffalensis
- Motto: Where Talent Takes You
- Type: Private university
- Established: 1961; 65 years ago
- Religious affiliation: Roman Catholic (Felician Sisters)
- President: Matthew Giordano
- Academic staff: 37 FT/ 54 PT (2023)
- Students: 545
- Undergraduates: 545
- Location: Buffalo, New York, United States; 42.913408°N 78.797223°W
- Campus: Buffalo, New York
- Colors: Blue and white
- Nickname: Villa Vikings
- Sporting affiliations: USCAA
- Mascot: Viking
- Website: www.villa.edu

Villa Maria College is a private Catholic college in Buffalo, New York, United States. It was founded in 1961 by the Felician Sisters.

== History ==
The college was initially a teacher-training center for sisters in the education apostolate and was established as an affiliate of the Catholic University of America. In 1961, a provisional charter was secured from the Board of Regents of the State of New York to grant Associate in Arts and Associate in Applied Science degrees to women religious.

=== Paul William Beltz Family Art Gallery ===
The Paul William Beltz Family Art Gallery is located on the ground floor of the Main Building on campus. It gives students a professional space to display and share their work on campus. The gallery features exhibitions from students, faculty, as well as local and regional artists.

== Athletics ==
The Villa Maria athletic teams are called the Vikings. The college is a member of the United States Collegiate Athletic Association (USCAA), competing as an independent.

Villa Maria competes in three intercollegiate varsity sports: Men's sports include basketball and esports; while women's sports include basketball, esports and flag football.

The school's athletics department was abolished in 1994 and later reintroduced in 2015.
