= Jefferson Community College (New York) =

Community college in Watertown, New York, U.S.

- Motto: There's more here
- Type: Public community college
- Established: November 7, 1961; 64 years ago
- Parent institution: State University of New York
- President: Dr. Daniel J. Dupee, II
- Undergraduates: 2,344 (fall 2025)
- Location: Watertown, New York, United States; 43.98843°N 75.938959°W
- Campus: Suburban 90 acres (0.36 km^{2})
- Colors: Maroon and white
- Nickname: Cannoneers
- Sporting affiliations: National Junior College Athletic Association, Region III, Mid-State Athletic Conference
- Website: www.sunyjefferson.edu

Jefferson Community College (SUNY Jefferson) is a public community college in Watertown, New York. Established on November 7, 1961, Jefferson Community College was the area's first institution of higher education and remains the only college with a campus in a 50 miles (80 km) radius. It was initially accredited in 1969, and until 2025 was the only college in the State University of New York (SUNY) System with a zoo technology degree program.

== History ==
The college was established on November 7, 1961. Jefferson admitted 119 full and 221 part-time students to its first class in September 1963. A SUNY Small Business Development Center was opened on the campus in 1986. In June 2020 the college fired around twenty employees after a loss of over $5 million USD due to the COVID-19 pandemic. On January 31, 2022, the college revamped a computer room to turn it into an Esports lab.

== Campus ==
The college campus, located near Interstate Highway 81 on the western boundary of the City of Watertown, consists of ten permanent buildings, athletic fields, and ample parking for its commuter student body. Jefferson's first on-campus student housing, east hall, opened in the Fall 2014 semester for full-time students. The 294-bed residence hall features fully-furnished suite-style units designed to accommodate 6, 5 and 4 students. In March 2016, the college opened the brand new Collaborative Learning Center, named for the college's 3rd president, John W. Deans. The first floor contains academic support services for students including academic coaching, placement testing, transfer counseling, career planning and job placement, veterans services and the Strategies To Achieve Results (STAR) and EOP programs. The second floor is home to tutoring services, the college library and media center.

The campus consists of eight permanent buildings :

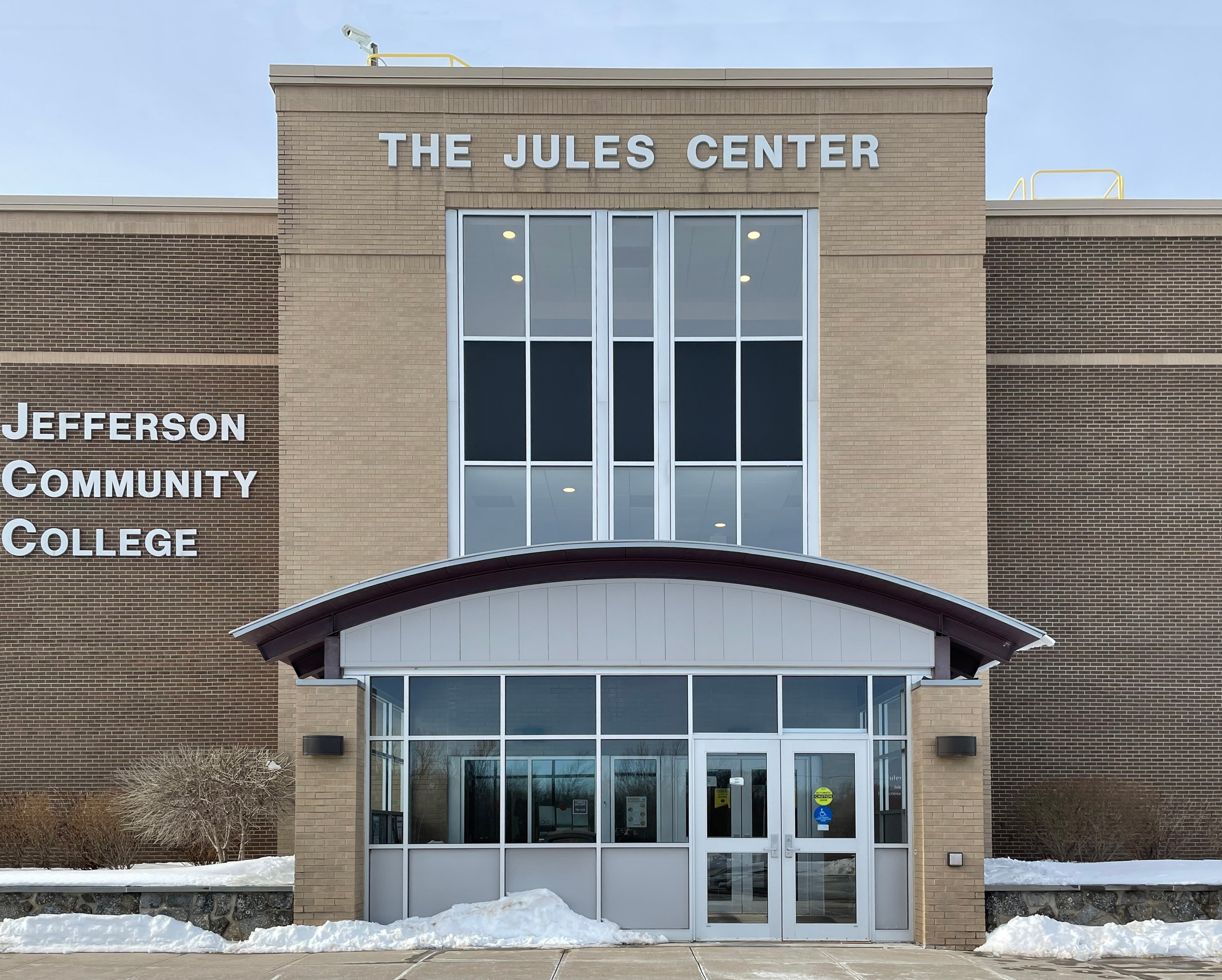
The Jules Center

- The Samuel Guthrie Building
- The John Foster Dulles Building
- The Gregor Building
- The James McVean College Center Building
- The Robert Lansing Administration Building
- The John T. Henderson Child Care Center
- The Jules R. Samann Instructional Resource Center (Often shortened to "The Jules Center")

There are five instructional computer classrooms and one computer resource center. Jefferson offers a baseball diamond, soccer/lacrosse fields, lighted tennis and basketball courts, and a walking/running trail.

== Academics ==
Jefferson offers 14 A.A.S. career curricula, 12 transfer A.A. or A.S. curricula and six certificate programs. Six of these programs are available entirely online. The college also offers degree programs from other colleges in the "Higher Education Program". This includes joint programs with State University of New York at Potsdam, Keuka College, Empire State University, Upstate Medical University, and Paul Smith's College. The cost of In-state tuition is US$5,664 and $10,176 for out of state tuition.

== Student life ==
There were 2,658 students in fall 2020, with 1,431 of them full-time and 1,227 of them part-time. In fall 2018, the ethnicity distribution of the college was 73% White, 9% Hispanic/Latino, 9% Black/African Americans 3% of two or more races, 1% Asian, 1% Indian, and 1% international student, with the gender distribution being 60% Female 40% Male. The college's first residence hall opened in 2014. It houses 294 students and includes two classrooms, a large group meeting room, a security desk, a technology nook and two large study/social lounges on the main floor. Study lounges are also on each floor in both wings.

=== Sports ===
Physical education is a requirement at the school. Sports teams include:

- Soccer (Men's/Women's)
- Basketball (Men's/Women's)
- Volleyball (Women's)
- Golf (Men's/Women's)
- Baseball (Men's)
- Softball (Women's)
- Lacrosse (Men's)
- Hockey (Men's) (AAU)

Clubs are often created to make up for some of the sports that are not teams, such as cheerleading and football. The Men's/Women's Basketball team and Women's Volleyball team play their home games at The McVean Center Gymnasium which has a capacity of 1,800.

=== Student clubs ===
In addition to the sports that Jefferson Community College provides, the college also has many clubs that students may join. JCC provides clubs for most sports such as :

- Far Out Club (Fitness and Recreation Outing Club)
- Cheerleading Club
- Dance Club
- Ping Pong Club
- Ski Club
- Phi Theta Kappa

Clubs that relate to degrees that are available at JCC include:

- Business Club
- Criminal Justice Club
- Early Childhood Club
- Emergency Medical Services (EMS Club)
- Human Services Club
