= Mid Hudson Conference =

- Association: NJCAA
- Founded: 1973; 53 years ago
- Sports fielded: 18; men's: 10; women's: 8
- No. of teams: 6
- Headquarters: New York, New York
- Region: New York – NJCAA Region 15
- Official website: mhcsports.org

Mid Hudson Conference (MHC) is a junior college conference in Region 15 of the National Junior College Athletic Association (NJCAA). The MHC was created to provide an association for two year colleges of the Mid-Hudson area. The conference was created to strengthen the work of member colleges in developing good sportsmanship and promote all forms of athletics for college students. Conference championships are held in most sports and individuals can be named to All-Conference and All-Academic teams.

== Member schools ==
=== Current members ===
Locations of current member schools

The Mid-Hudson currently has six full members, all are public schools:

Institution	Location (Note: All locations are within the State of New York.)	Founded	Affiliation	Enrollment	Nickname	Joined
Dutchess Community College (SUNY Dutchess)	Poughkeepsie	1957	Public (Note: Part of the State University of New York System.)	8,582	Falcons	?
Orange County Community College (SUNY Orange)	Middletown	1950	Public	6,617	Colts	?
Rockland Community College (SUNY Rockland)	Ramapo	1959	Public	6,859	Fighting Hawks	?
Sullivan County Community College (SUNY Sullivan)	Fallsburg	1962	Public	1,534	Generals	?
Ulster County Community College (SUNY Ulster)	Marbletown	1961	Public	3,554	Senators	?
Westchester Community College (SUNY Westchester)	Mount Pleasant	1946	Public	11,535	Vikings	?

=== Former members ===
The Mid-Hudson had one former full member, which was also a private school:

Institution	Location (Note: All locations are within the State of New York.)	Founded	Affiliation	Enrollment	Nickname	Joined	Left	Current conference
Monroe College	The Bronx	1933	For-profit	6,794	Mustangs	?	?	Independent (NJCAA Region XV)

== See also ==
- Hudson Valley Intercollegiate Athletic Conference
- City University of New York Athletic Conference, also in NJCAA Region 15
