= Mid-State Athletic Conference =

- Association: NJCAA
- Founded: 1970
- Sports fielded: 9; men's: 4; women's: 5
- Division: Region 3
- No. of teams: 8
- Region: New York

The Mid-State Athletic Conference (MSAC) is a junior college conference located within Region III of the National Junior College Athletic Association (NJCAA). The MSAC has 8 member schools, all located in Upstate New York. Conference championships are held in most sports and individuals can be named to All- ncca

== Member schools ==
=== Current members ===
The Mid-State currently has seven full members, all are public schools:

Institution	Location (Note: All locations are within the State New York.)	Founded	Affiliation	Enrollment	Nickname	Joined
Broome Community College (SUNY Broome)	Dickinson	1946	Public (Note: Part of the State University of New York (SUNY) System.)	5,386	Hornets	1987
Cayuga Community College (SUNY Cayuga)	Auburn	1953	Public	3,775	Spartans	1987
Corning Community College (SUNY Corning)	Corning	1957	Public	3,972	Red Barons	1990s
Finger Lakes Community College (SUNY Finger Lakes)	Canandaigua	1965	Public	5,944	Lakers	1987
Jefferson Community College (SUNY Jefferson)	Watertown	1961	Public	2,658	Cannoneers	1987
Onondaga Community College (SUNY Onondaga)	Syracuse	1961	Public	9,834	Lazers	1987
Tompkins Cortland Community College (SUNY Tompkins Cortland)	Dryden	1968	Public	2,373	Panthers	1987

=== Former members ===
The Mid-State had three former full members, all but one were public schools:

Institution	Location (Note: All locations are within the State New York.)	Founded	Affiliation	Enrollment	Nickname	Joined	Left	Current conference
Cazenovia College	Cazenovia	1824	Nonsectarian (Note: Formerly affiliated with the Methodist Church.)	800	Wildcats	1987		North Atlantic (NAC) (Note: Currently an NCAA Division III athletic conference.)
Columbia–Greene Community College (SUNY Columbia–Greene)	Hudson	1966	Public (Note: Part of the State University of New York (SUNY) System.)	1,578	Twins			Mountain Valley (MVCC) (NJCAA Region III)
State University of New York at Canton (SUNY Canton)	Canton	1906	Public	3,216	Kangaroos	1990s		North Atlantic (NAC)

== History ==
This conference began during the 1987–88 school year. Prior to this, a proposal was brought forward to the athletic directors of the original members (listed below) by Mr. Larry Hinkle, director of athletics at Tompkins Cortland CC. The concept was approved and each A.D. received approval from his/her college president. After collaboration with other conferences already formed within Region III, Mr. Hinkle drafted MSAC by-laws. After review and minor tweaking, the by-laws were approved and officers were elected. The result was that the Mid-State Athletic Basketball Conference was officially formed. As sports were added, it became the Mid-State Athletic Conference. The original members were:

- Broome Community College
- Cayuga Community College
- Cazenovia College
- Finger Lakes Community College
- Jefferson Community College
- Onondaga Community College
- Tompkins Cortland Community College

In the early 1990s, SUNY Canton was added as well as Corning Community College. Columbia-Greene Community College joined from the Mountain Valley Athletic Conference for the 2016-17 school year.

== See also ==
- Athletics in upstate New York
- Sports in Syracuse
