= 2023 Purdue Fort Wayne Mastodons baseball team =

American college baseball season

2023 Purdue Fort Wayne Mastodons baseball
- Conference: Horizon League
- Record: 10–38 (6–18 Horizon)
- Head coach: Doug Schreiber (4th season)
- Assistant coach: Justin Huff (3rd season)
- Hitting coach: Ken Jones (4th season)
- Pitching coach: Brent McNeil (4th season)
- Home stadium: Mastodon Field

2023 Horizon League baseball standings
	Conf.				Overall
Team	W		L	PCT	W		L	PCT
Wright State ‍†‍‡‍^{y}	22	–	8	.733	39	–	21	.650
Oakland ‍‍‍	18	–	12	.600	29	–	31	.483
Northern Kentucky ‍‍‍	17	–	13	.567	30	–	27	.526
Youngstown State ‍‍‍	13	–	16	.448	19	–	36	.345
Milwaukee ‍‍‍	11	–	18	.379	25	–	32	.439
Purdue Fort Wayne ‍‍‍	8	–	22	.267	13	–	43	.232
† – Conference champion ‡ – Tournament champion y – Invited to the NCAA Tournament; As of May 27, 2023; Rankings from D1Baseball

The 2023 Purdue Fort Wayne Mastodons baseball team is a baseball team that represents Purdue University Fort Wayne in the 2023 NCAA Division I baseball season. The Mastodons are members of the Horizon League and play their home games at Mastodon Field in Fort Wayne, Indiana. They are led by fourth-year head coach Doug Schreiber.

== Previous season ==
The Mastodons finished the 2022 NCAA Division I baseball season 18–36 overall (13–15 conference) and fourth place in the conference standings, qualifying for the 2022 Horizon League Baseball Tournament, where they were eliminated in the play-in round after going 0–1.

== Preseason Horizon poll ==
For the 2023 poll, Purdue Fort Wayne was projected to finish in sixth in the Conference.

Media poll
Predicted finish	Team	Votes (1st place)
1	Wright State	41 (5)
2	Oakland	29
3	Milwaukee	28
4	Youngstown State	24
5	Northern Kentucky	21 (1)
6	Purdue Fort Wayne	19

== Roster ==
2023 Purdue Fort Wayne Mastodons baseball team
Players
Coaches

#	Pos.	Name	B/T	Height	Weight	Year	Previous school	Home town
1	C	Jose Fernandez	R/R	5 ft 9 in (1.75 m)	185 lb (84 kg)	Fr	Belen Jesuit Preparatory School	Miami, Florida
2	C	Dylan Stewart	R/R	5 ft 10 in (1.78 m)	160 lb (73 kg)	RS Sr	Milford H. S.	Milford, Ohio
3	RHP	Owen Willard	R/R	6 ft 0 in (1.83 m)	185 lb (84 kg)	Fr	Eastside H. S.	Butler, Indiana
5		Jacob Walker	R/R	5 ft 9 in (1.75 m)	170 lb (77 kg)	So	Lake Land College	Lafayette, Indiana
6	INF	Cade Nelis	L/R	5 ft 10 in (1.78 m)	195 lb (88 kg)	Sr	Lincoln Trail College	Noblesville, Indiana
7	INF	Braedon Blackford	R/R	6 ft 0 in (1.83 m)	195 lb (88 kg)	RS Sr	Peoria Notre Dame H. S.	Peoria, Illinois
8		Eli Tencza	R/R	6 ft 1 in (1.85 m)	190 lb (86 kg)	Jr	Frontier Community College	Lexington, Kentucky
9		Jarrett Bickel	R/R	5 ft 10 in (1.78 m)	182 lb (83 kg)	Sr	Palm Beach State College	South Bend, Indiana
10	OF	Ben Higgins	R/R	5 ft 11 in (1.8 m)	190 lb (86 kg)	Sr	Carl Sandburg College	Macomb, Illinois
11	RHP	Bryce Martens	R/R	6 ft 0 in (1.83 m)	185 lb (84 kg)	So	John Adams H. S.	South Bend, Indiana
12	OF	Tyler Nelson	R/R	6 ft 0 in (1.83 m)	190 lb (86 kg)	Jr	Chesterton H. S.	Chesterton, Indiana
13	RHP	Rex Stills	R/R	6 ft 4 in (1.93 m)	200 lb (91 kg)	So	Wheeler H. S.	Valparaiso, Indiana
14	RHP	Blake Lemmon	R/R	6 ft 2 in (1.88 m)	180 lb (82 kg)	RS Fr	Martinsville H. S.	Martinsville, Indiana
15	RHP	Braxton Wilson	R/R	6 ft 2 in (1.88 m)	180 lb (82 kg)	So	Martinsville H. S.	Martinsville, Indiana
16	OF	Grant Thoroman	L/L	5 ft 11 in (1.8 m)	190 lb (86 kg)	Jr	Lincoln Land Community College	Girard, Illinois
17	LHP	Jacob Myer	L/L	6 ft 4 in (1.93 m)	220 lb (100 kg)	Sr	Iowa Lakes Community College	Milwaukee, Wisconsin
18	LHP	Justin Miller	L/L	5 ft 10 in (1.78 m)	175 lb (79 kg)	RS Sr	Homestead H. S.	Roanoke, Indiana
19	INF	Colton Shirley	L/R	6 ft 2 in (1.88 m)	190 lb (86 kg)	So	College of DuPage	Anderson, Indiana
20	RHP	J. D. Deany	R/R	6 ft 0 in (1.83 m)	190 lb (86 kg)	RS Sr	Illinois Central College	Mackinaw, Illinois
21		Luke Miles	S/R	6 ft 1 in (1.85 m)	205 lb (93 kg)	Sr	Franklin Community H. S.	Morgantown, Indiana
22	C	Cade Fitzpatrick	R/R	6 ft 1 in (1.85 m)	213 lb (97 kg)	Sr	Franklin Central H. S.	Indianapolis, Indiana
23	RHP	Michael Madura	R/R	6 ft 6 in (1.98 m)	200 lb (91 kg)	RS Sr	South Suburban College	Munster, Indiana
24		Enas Hayden	R/R	6 ft 3 in (1.91 m)	210 lb (95 kg)	So	Lawrence North H. S.	Indianapolis, Indiana
25	OF	Isaiah Hart	R/R	6 ft 1 in (1.85 m)	225 lb (102 kg)	Sr	Lakeland Community College	Lake Zurich, Illinois
26		Dalton Madsen	R/R	6 ft 3 in (1.91 m)	180 lb (82 kg)	Sr	Bryant & Stratton College	Janesville, Wisconsin
27	RHP	Kyle Maurer	R/R	6 ft 1 in (1.85 m)	190 lb (86 kg)	Sr	McHenry County College	Huntley, Illinois
28	RHP	Mac Ayres	R/R	6 ft 3 in (1.91 m)	195 lb (88 kg)	Jr	Scecina H. S.	Indianapolis, Indiana
29	C	Brooks Sailors	L/R	6 ft 1 in (1.85 m)	180 lb (82 kg)	Jr	Frontier H. S.	Brookston, Indiana
31		Karter Hann	L/L	6 ft 2 in (1.88 m)	210 lb (95 kg)	So	Harrison H. S.	West Lafayette, Indiana
32	RHP	Kevin Fee	R/R	6 ft 5 in (1.96 m)	220 lb (100 kg)	Jr	New Albany H. S.	New Albany, Ohio
34	RHP	Brody Fine	R/R	6 ft 4 in (1.93 m)	225 lb (102 kg)	Fr	McCutcheon H. S.	Lafayette, Indiana
35	RHP	Sam Garland	R/R	6 ft 0 in (1.83 m)	220 lb (100 kg)	So	Tecumseh H. S.	Newburgh, Indiana
36	RHP	Adam Hutchinson	R/R	6 ft 3 in (1.91 m)	215 lb (98 kg)	Jr	Lincoln Trail College	Greenville, Indiana
37	LHP	Jake Paymaster	L/L	6 ft 3 in (1.91 m)	215 lb (98 kg)	Jr	Triton College	New Lenox, Illinois
38	RHP	Brendan Reid	R/R	5 ft 11 in (1.8 m)	225 lb (102 kg)	RS Sr	Frontier Community College	Union, Kentucky
39	RHP	Charlie Hawk	R/R	6 ft 3 in (1.91 m)	192 lb (87 kg)	Fr	Lawrence Central H. S.	Indianapolis, Indiana
40	RHP	Colin Bauer	R/R	5 ft 11 in (1.8 m)	195 lb (88 kg)	RS Jr	Illinois Central College	Peoria, Illinois
41	LHP	Silas Israel	L/L	6 ft 3 in (1.91 m)	185 lb (84 kg)	Jr	Carl Sandburg College	Tremont, Illinois
42		Drew Dillon	L/L	6 ft 5 in (1.96 m)	200 lb (91 kg)	Jr	Olney Central College	Greenwood, Indiana

Head coach

Doug Schreiber

Assistant coach(es)

Hitting coach(es)

Ken Jones

Base coach(es)

Justin Huff

Pitching coach(es)

Brent McNeil

Legend

- (C) Team captain
- (S) Suspended
- (I) Ineligible
- Injured
- Current redshirt

Roster
Last update: February 15, 2021

== Schedule ==
2023 Purdue Fort Wayne Mastodons baseball game log
Regular season
February (1–7)

#	Date	Rank	Opponent	Site/stadium	Score	Win	Loss	Save	Attendance	Overall record	Horizon record
1	February 17		at Alabama State	Wheeler–Watkins Baseball Complex • Montgomery, Alabama	0–13	Melendez (1–0)	Deany (0–1)	None	457	0–1	–
2	February 18		at Alabama State	Wheeler–Watkins Baseball Complex • Montgomery, Alabama	4–3	Reid (1–0)	Quiles (0–1)	Miller (1)	65	1–1	–
3	February 18		at Alabama State	Wheeler–Watkins Baseball Complex • Montgomery, Alabama	4–18	Mendez (1–0)	Stills (0–1)	None	70	1–2	–
4	February 19		at Alabama State	Wheeler–Watkins Baseball Complex • Montgomery, Alabama	11–13	Se. Colon (1–0)	Bauer (0–1)	Sh. Colon (1)	85	1–3	–
5	February 24		at Bethune–Cookman	Jackie Robinson Ballpark • Daytona Beach, Florida	8–13	Perez (1–1)	Fine (0–1)	None	122	1–4	–
6	February 25		at Bethune–Cookman	Jackie Robinson Ballpark • Daytona Beach, Florida	5–9	Santos (1–0)	Myer (0–1)	York (1)	133	1–5	–
7	February 25		at Bethune–Cookman	Jackie Robinson Ballpark • Daytona Beach, Florida	4–7	Michaud (1–0)	Stills (0–2)	Gonzalez (1)	161	1–6	–
8	February 26		at Bethune–Cookman	Jackie Robinson Ballpark • Daytona Beach, Florida	0–10	Gaviria (1–0)	Ayres (0–1)	None	101	1–7	

March (6–12)

#	Date	Rank	Opponent	Site/stadium	Score	Win	Loss	Save	Attendance	Overall record	Horizon record
9	March 3		at #2 Wake Forest	David F. Couch Ballpark • Winston-Salem, North Carolina	0–11	Lowder (3–0)	Hayden (0–1)	None	358	1–8	–
10	March 4		vs Cornell	David F. Couch Ballpark • Winston-Salem, North Carolina	6–3	Deany (1–1)	Hamill (0–2)	Fine (1)	167	2–8	–
11	March 4		vs Ball State	David F. Couch Ballpark • Winston-Salem, North Carolina	0–11	Johnson (2–1)	Stills (0–3)	None	253	2–9	–
12	March 5		vs Ball State	David F. Couch Ballpark • Winston-Salem, North Carolina	9–13	Weatherly (1–1)	Reid (1–1)	None	167	2–10	–
13	March 8		at Indiana	Bart Kaufman Field • Bloomington, Indiana	1–15	Bothwell (2–1)	Bauer (0–1)	None	1,118	2–11	–
14	March 10		vs Austin Peay	Charles H. Braun Stadium • Evansville, Indiana	0–9	Holt (2–0)	Deany (1–2)	None	137	2–12	–
15	March 10		at Austin Peay	Charles H. Braun Stadium • Evansville, Indiana	5–6	Robinson (1–1)	Stills (0–4)	Pollard (1)	137	2–13	–
16	March 11		at Austin Peay	Charles H. Braun Stadium • Evansville, Indiana	5–3	Fee (1–0)	Crawford (0–1)	None	157	3–13	–
17	March 11		at Austin Peay	Charles H. Braun Stadium • Evansville, Indiana	2–4	Kush (1–1)	Fine (0–3)	Magrans (1)	157	3–14	–
–	March 14		at Ball State	Ball Diamond • Muncie, Indiana	Game cancelled						
18	March 17		at Wright State	Nischwitz Stadium • Fairborn, Ohio	12–10	Martens (1–0)	Valentine (0–1)	Ayres	178	4–14	1–0
19	March 18		at Wright State	Nischwitz Stadium • Fairborn, Ohio	2–6	Gongora (2–1)	Hayden (0–2)	Theis (1)	187	4–15	1–1
20	March 19		at Wright State	Nischwitz Stadium • Fairborn, Ohio	4–13	Gallagher (1–0)	Myer (0–2)	None	289	4–16	1–2
21	March 21		at Bowling Green	Steller Field • Bowling Green, Ohio	6–8	Penrod (4–0)	Fee (1–1)	Recker (2)	203	4–17	1–2
22	March 24		Northern Kentucky	Mastodon Field • Fort Wayne, Indiana	6–5	Ayres (1–1)	Brock (3–1)	Deany (1)	134	5–17	2–2
23	March 26		Northern Kentucky	Mastodon Field • Fort Wayne, Indiana	9–5	Deany (2–2)	Mulhern (0–1)	None	219	6–17	3–2
24	March 26		Northern Kentucky	Mastodon Field • Fort Wayne, Indiana	1–10	Echeman (2–1)	Willard (0–1)	None	189	6–18	3–3
25	March 28		Bowling Green	Mastodon Field • Fort Wayne, Indiana	4–7	Ramos (1–1)	Fee (1–2)	Turner (1)	120	6–19	3–4
26	March 31		at Youngstown State	Eastwood Field • Niles, Ohio	12–9	Deany (3–2)	Perry (3–2)	Miller (2)	103	7–19	4–3

April (3–16)

#	Date	Rank	Opponent	Site/stadium	Score	Win	Loss	Save	Attendance	Overall record	Horizon record
28	April 1		at Youngstown State	Eastwood Field • Niles, Ohio	14–15	Misik (1–2)	Reid (1–2)	None	102	7–20	4–4
29	April 2		at Youngstown State	Eastwood Field • Niles, Ohio	9–3	Fine (1–3)	Misik (1–3)	None	124	8–20	5–4
30	April 4		Toledo	Mastodon Field • Fort Wayne, Indiana	8–9	McAninch (1–0)	Martens (1–1)	None	172	8–21	5–4
31	April 6		at Oakland	Oakland Baseball Field • Rochester, Michigan	9–14	Fekete (1–1)	Martens (1–2)	Decker (1)	121	8–22	5–5
32	April 7		at Oakland	Oakland Baseball Field • Rochester, Michigan	2–7	Pidek (1–1)	Willard (0–2)	Stants (2)	143	8–23	5–6
33	April 8		at Oakland	Oakland Baseball Field • Rochester, Michigan	6–7	Densmore (3–3)	Myer (0–3)	Decker (2)	129	8–24	5–7
34	April 11		at Valparaiso	Emory G. Bauer Field • Valparaiso, Indiana	3–9	Krier (1–0)	Stills (0–5)	None	123	8–25	5–7
35	April 12		at Dayton	Woerner Field • Dayton, Ohio	3–8	Claybourne (1–0)	Enas (0–3)	None	107	8–26	5–7
36	April 14		Milwaukee	Mastodon Field • Fort Wayne, Indiana	7–4	Ayres (2–1)	Frey (4–4)	Miller (3)	188	9–26	6–7
37	April 15		Milwaukee	Mastodon Field • Fort Wayne, Indiana	6–7	Hansel (5–1)	Myer (0–4)	DeYoung (7)	265	9–2	6–8
38	April 15		Milwaukee	Mastodon Field • Fort Wayne, Indiana	8–15	Turnquist (3–2)	Willard (0–3)	None	221	9–28	6–9
39	April 19		at Michigan State	Drayton McLane Baseball Stadium at John H. Kobs Field • East Lansing, Michigan	3–2	Reid (2–2)	Berghorst (1–1)	Miller (4)	503	10–28	6–9
40	April 21		Wright State	Mastodon Field • Fort Wayne, Indiana	4–6	Theis (3–3)	Fee (1–3)	Luikart (5)	145	10–29	6–10
41	April 22		Wright State	Wildcat Baseball Field • Marion, Indiana	6–17	Shirk (3–4)	Fine (1–4)	None	78	10–30	6–11
42	April 23		Wright State	Mastodon Field • Fort Wayne, Indiana	5–11	Stofel (2–3)	Willard (0–4)	Laisure (1)	101	10–31	6–12
43	April 26		Dayton	Mastodon Field • Fort Wayne, Indiana	10–11	Claybourne (2–0)	Reid (2–3)	None	118	10–32	6–12
44	April 28		at Northern Kentucky	Bill Aker Baseball Complex • Highland Heights, Kentucky	8–13	Werrmann (6–1)	Ayres (2–2)	None	89	10–33	6–13
45	April 29		at Northern Kentucky	Bill Aker Baseball Complex • Highland Heights, Kentucky	15–23	Lopez (2–2)	Fee (1–4)	None	212	10–34	6–14
46	April 30		at Northern Kentucky	Bill Aker Baseball Complex • Highland Heights, Kentucky	12–18	Massie (1–2)	Fee (1–5)	None	234	10–35	6–15

May (0–3)

#	Date	Rank	Opponent	Site/stadium	Score	Win	Loss	Save	Attendance	Overall record	Horizon record
47	May 5		Youngstown State	Mastodon Field • Fort Wayne, Indiana	4–9	Perry (5–4)	Ayres (2–3)	None	102	10–36	6–16
48	May 6		Youngstown State	Mastodon Field • Fort Wayne, Indiana	3–12	Gebhardt (1–3)	Fine (1–5)	Perez (1)	128	10–37	6–17
49	May 7		Youngstown State	Mastodon Field • Fort Wayne, Indiana	10–14	Cam Marshalwitz (2–2)	Myer (0–5)	None	142	10–38	6–18
50	May 12		Oakland	Mastodon Field • Fort Wayne, Indiana	–	–	–	–	–	–	–
51	May 13		Oakland	Mastodon Field • Fort Wayne, Indiana	–	–	–	–	–	–	–
52	May 14		Oakland	Mastodon Field • Fort Wayne, Indiana	–	–	–	–	–	–	–
53	May 16		at Toledo	Scott Park Baseball Complex • Toledo, Ohio	–	–	–	–	–	–	–
54	May 18		at Milwaukee	Franklin Field • Franklin, Wisconsin	–	–	–	–	–	–	–
55	May 19		at Milwaukee	Franklin Field • Franklin, Wisconsin	–	–	–	–	–	–	–
56	May 20		at Milwaukee	Franklin Field • Franklin, Wisconsin	–	–	–	–	–	–	–

== Awards ==
=== Horizon League Players of the Week ===
Weekly Awards
Player	Award	Date Awarded	Ref.
Braedon Blackford	Batter of the Week	March 8, 2023	
Ben Higgins	Batter of the Week	April 4, 2023	
