= 2022 Purdue Fort Wayne Mastodons baseball team =

American college baseball season

2022 Purdue Fort Wayne Mastodons baseball
- Conference: Horizon League
- Record: 18–36 (13–15 Horizon)
- Head coach: (3rd season)
- Assistant coach: Justin Huff (2nd season)
- Hitting coach: Ken Jones (3rd season)
- Pitching coach: Brent McNeil (3rd season)
- Home stadium: Mastodon Field

2022 Horizon League baseball standings
	Conf.				Overall
Team	W		L	PCT	W		L	PCT
Wright State ‍†‍‡‍^{y}	20	–	9	.690	30	–	25	.545
Oakland ‍‍‍	18	–	11	.621	31	–	27	.534
UIC ‍‍‍	14	–	11	.560	22	–	25	.468
Purdue Fort Wayne ‍‍‍	13	–	15	.464	18	–	36	.333
Youngstown State ‍‍‍	12	–	16	.429	21	–	36	.368
Northern Kentucky ‍‍‍	11	–	17	.393	19	–	35	.352
Milwaukee ‍‍‍	9	–	17	.346	20	–	29	.408
† – Conference champion ‡ – Tournament champion y – Invited to the NCAA tournament Rankings from D1Baseball

The 2022 Purdue Fort Wayne Mastodons baseball team was a baseball team that represented Purdue University Fort Wayne in the 2022 NCAA Division I baseball season. The Mastodons were members of the Horizon League and played their home games at Mastodon Field in Fort Wayne, Indiana. They were led by third-year head coach Doug Schreiber.

== Previous season ==
In their first season in the Horizon League, the Mastodons finished the 2022 NCAA Division I baseball season 11–35 overall (8–28 conference) and seventh place in the conference standings, as the season was limited to only 40 games, and an increase of conference games from 30 to 36 due to the COVID-19 pandemic.

== Roster ==
2022 Purdue Fort Wayne Mastodons baseball team
Players
Coaches

#	Pos.	Name	B/T	Height	Weight	Year	Previous school	Home town
1	OF	Garrett Maish	R/R	5 ft 7 in (1.7 m)	170 lb (77 kg)	So	McCutcheon H. S.	Lafayette, Indiana
2	C	Dylan Stewart	R/R	5 ft 10 in (1.78 m)	160 lb (73 kg)	Sr	Milford H. S.	Milford, Ohio
3	INF	Braedon Blackford	R/R	6 ft 0 in (1.83 m)	195 lb (88 kg)	RS Sr	Peoria Notre Dame H. S.	Peoria, Illinois
5	INF	Jack Lang	R/R	6 ft 0 in (1.83 m)	185 lb (84 kg)	RS Sr	Hamilton Southeastern H. S.	Fishers, Indiana
6	INF	Cade Nelis	L/R	5 ft 10 in (1.78 m)	195 lb (88 kg)	Jr	Lincoln Trail College	Noblesville, Indiana
7		Alex Evenson	L/L	6 ft 1 in (1.85 m)	175 lb (79 kg)	RS Sr	Century College	Minnetonka, Minnesota
8	RHP	Sam Assaf	R/R	6 ft 0 in (1.83 m)	170 lb (77 kg)	So	Powers Catholic H. S.	Flushing, Michigan
9		Jarrett Bickel	R/R	5 ft 10 in (1.78 m)	180 lb (82 kg)	Jr	Palm Beach State College	South Bend, Indiana
10	OF	Ben Higgins	R/R	5 ft 11 in (1.8 m)	190 lb (86 kg)	Jr	Carl Sandburg College	Macomb, Illinois
11	RHP	Bryce Martens	R/R	6 ft 0 in (1.83 m)	180 lb (82 kg)	Fr	John Adams H. S.	South Bend, Indiana
12	INF	Brian Erbe	R/R	6 ft 1 in (1.85 m)	185 lb (84 kg)	RS So	Oakwood H. S.	Dayton, Ohio
13	RHP	Rex Stills	R/R	6 ft 4 in (1.93 m)	190 lb (86 kg)	Fr	Wheeler H. S.	Valparaiso, Indiana
14	RHP	Brian Skelton	R/R	6 ft 2 in (1.88 m)	205 lb (93 kg)	RS Sr	Westfield H. S.	Westfield, Indiana
15	RHP	Braxton Wilson	R/R	6 ft 2 in (1.88 m)	175 lb (79 kg)	Fr	Martinsville H. S.	Martinsville, Indiana
16		Garett Lake	L/L	6 ft 0 in (1.83 m)	200 lb (91 kg)	RS Sr	Pima Community College	Henderson, Nevada
17	LHP	Jacob Myer	L/L	6 ft 4 in (1.93 m)	190 lb (86 kg)	Jr	Iowa Lakes Community College	Milwaukee, Wisconsin
18	LHP	Justin Miller	L/L	5 ft 9 in (1.75 m)	180 lb (82 kg)	Sr	Homestead H. S.	Roanoke, Indiana
19	RHP	Gerald Pintarich	R/R	6 ft 1 in (1.85 m)	195 lb (88 kg)	Jr	Cuyahoga Community College	St. Clairsville, Ohio
20	RHP	J. D. Deany	R/R	6 ft 0 in (1.83 m)	185 lb (84 kg)	Sr	Illinois Central College	Mackinaw, Illinois
21		Luke Miles	S/R	6 ft 1 in (1.85 m)	195 lb (88 kg)	Jr	Franklin Community H. S.	Morgantown, Indiana
22	C	Cade Fitzpatrick	R/R	6 ft 1 in (1.85 m)	210 lb (95 kg)	Jr	Franklin Central H. S.	Indianapolis, Indiana
23	RHP	Michael Madura	R/R	6 ft 6 in (1.98 m)	190 lb (86 kg)	RS Sr	South Suburban College	Munster, Indiana
24		Enas Hayden	R/R	6 ft 3 in (1.91 m)	210 lb (95 kg)	Fr	Lawrence North H. S.	Indianapolis, Indiana
25	OF	Isaiah Hart	R/R	6 ft 1 in (1.85 m)	210 lb (95 kg)	So	Lakeland Community College	Lake Zurich, Illinois
26		Dalton Madsen	R/R	6 ft 2 in (1.88 m)	195 lb (88 kg)	Jr	Bryant & Stratton College	Janesville, Wisconsin
27	RHP	Kyle Maurer	R/R	6 ft 0 in (1.83 m)	210 lb (95 kg)	Fr	McHenry County College	Huntley, Illinois
28	C	J. D. Garman	S/R	6 ft 2 in (1.88 m)	210 lb (95 kg)	Fr	Powers Catholic H. S.	Davison, Michigan
29	C	Brooks Sailors	L/R	5 ft 11 in (1.8 m)	160 lb (73 kg)	So	Westfield H. S.	Westfield, Indiana
31		Karter Hann	L/L	6 ft 2 in (1.88 m)	205 lb (93 kg)	Fr	Harrison H. S.	West Lafayette, Indiana
32	RHP	Kevin Fee	R/R	6 ft 5 in (1.96 m)	215 lb (98 kg)	So	New Albany H. S.	New Albany, Ohio
34		Peyton Williams	R/R	5 ft 10 in (1.78 m)	180 lb (82 kg)	Jr	Kankakee Community College	Lafayette, Indiana
35	RHP	Sam Garland	R/R	6 ft 0 in (1.83 m)	220 lb (100 kg)	Fr	Tecumseh H. S.	Newburgh, Indiana
36		Ryan Robison	L/L	6 ft 3 in (1.91 m)	250 lb (113 kg)	Jr	Vincennes University	New Albany, Indiana
38	RHP	Brendan Reid	R/R	5 ft 11 in (1.8 m)	200 lb (91 kg)	Sr	Frontier Community College	Union, Kentucky
40	RHP	Mitchell Spencer	R/R	5 ft 10 in (1.78 m)	185 lb (84 kg)	RS So	Defiance H. S.	Defiance, Ohio

Head coach

Doug Schreiber

Assistant coach(es)

Hitting coach(es)

Ken Jones

Pitching coach(es)

Brent McNeil

Legend

- (C) Team captain
- (S) Suspended
- (I) Ineligible
- Injured
- Current redshirt

Roster
Last update: February 15, 2021

== Schedule ==
2022 Purdue Fort Wayne Mastodons baseball game log
Regular season
February (0–8)

#	Date	Opponent	Site/stadium	Score	Win	Loss	Save	Attendance	Overall record	Horizon record
1	February 18	at Georgia State	Georgia State Baseball Complex • Atlanta, Georgia	2–13	Treadway (1–0)	J. Miller (0–1)	Lutz (1)	372	0–1	–
2	February 19	at Georgia State	Georgia State Baseball Complex • Atlanta, Georgia	2–12	Dawson (1–0)	Deany (0–1)	None	395	0–2	–
3	February 19	at Georgia State	Georgia State Baseball Complex • Atlanta, Georgia	5–6	Clark (1–0)	Myer (0–1)	None	395	0–3	–
4	February 20	at Georgia State	Georgia State Baseball Complex • Atlanta, Georgia	7–8	Reddick (1–0)	Martens (0–1)	Jones (1)	385	0–4	–
5	February 25	at California Baptist	James W. Totman Stadium • Riverside, California	2–4	Culpepper (2–0)	Miller (0–2)	Finnel (1)	372	0–5	–
6	February 26	at California Baptist	James W. Totman Stadium • Riverside, California	5–23	Necochea (1–0)	Wilson (0–1)	None	336	0–6	–
7	February 26	at California Baptist	James W. Totman Stadium • Riverside, California	3–5	Villalobos (1–0)	Myer (0–2)	None	334	0–7	–
8	February 27	at California Baptist	James W. Totman Stadium • Riverside, California	1–11	Silvas (2–0)	Martens (0–2)	None	289	0–8	–

March (3–11)

#	Date	Opponent	Site/stadium	Score	Win	Loss	Save	Attendance	Overall record	Horizon record
9	March 4	at Tennessee Tech	Bush Stadium at Averitt Express Baseball Complex • Cookeville, Tennessee	4–13	Calitri (2–0)	Miller (0–3)	None	257	0–9	–
10	March 5	at Tennessee Tech	Bush Stadium at Averitt Express Baseball Complex • Cookeville, Tennessee	1–7	Gannaway (1–0)	Spencer (0–1)	Sylvester (1)	301	0–10	–
11	March 6	at Tennessee Tech	Bush Stadium at Averitt Express Baseball Complex • Cookeville, Tennessee	7–15	Taylor (1–0)	Myer (0–3)	None	359	0–11	–
12	March 9	at Indiana	Bart Kaufman Field • Bloomington, Indiana	2–12	Walker (1–0)	Stills (0–1)	None	1,437	0–12	–
13	March 11	at Saint Louis	Billiken Sports Center • St. Louis, Missouri	2–5	Hutt (1–1)	Martens (0–3)	Weber (1)	68	0–13	–
14	March 13	at Saint Louis	Billiken Sports Center • St. Louis, Missouri	4–1	Spencer (1–1)	Harris (1–3)	Myer (1)	114	1–13	–
15	March 13	at Saint Louis	Billiken Sports Center • St. Louis, Missouri	2–5	Schmitt (3–1)	Miller (0–4)	Pferrer (2)	89	1–14	–
16	March 16	Dayton	Mastodon Field • Fort Wayne, Indiana	4–8	Majick (2–0)	Myer (0–4)	None	195	1–15	–
17	March 18	Youngstown State	Mastodon Field • Fort Wayne, Indiana	0–4	Snyder (1–3)	Stills (0–2)	None	174	1–16	0–1
18	March 20	Youngstown State	Defiance High School • Defiance, Ohio	8–7	Wilson (1–1)	Marshalwitz (1–1)	None	125	2–16	1–1
19	March 20	Youngstown State	Defiance High School • Defiance, Ohio	6–12	Brosky (2–2)	Miller (0–5)	None	155	2–17	1–2
–	March 23	at Michigan State	Drayton McLane Baseball Stadium at John H. Kobs Field • East Lansing, Michigan	Game postponed						
21	March 25	at Oakland	Oakland Baseball Field • Rochester, Michigan	10–2	Stills (1–2)	Sagedahl (1–4)	Myer (1)	–	3–17	2–2
22	March 25	at Oakland	Oakland Baseball Field • Rochester, Michigan	2–10	Hagen (2–1)	Martens (0–4)	None	–	3–18	2–3
23	March 26	at Oakland	Oakland Baseball Field • Rochester, Michigan	9–10	Paugh (1–1)	Miller (0–6)	None	45	3–19	2–4
24	March 29	at Valparaiso	Emory G. Bauer Field • Valparaiso, Indiana	11–3	Deany (1–1)	Lockwood (0–2)	None	38	4–19	2–4

April (8–10)

#	Date	Opponent	Site/stadium	Score	Win	Loss	Save	Attendance	Overall record	Horizon record
25	April 1	Wright State	Mastodon Field • Fort Wayne, Indiana	3–5	Shirk (2–4)	Fee (0–1)	Luikart (3)	158	4–20	2–5
26	April 2	Wright State	Mastodon Field • Fort Wayne, Indiana	11–17	Simpson (2–0)	Spencer (1–2)	Haught (1)	201	4–21	2–6
27	April 3	Wright State	Mastodon Field • Fort Wayne, Indiana	3–12	Theis (2–0)	Miller (0–7)	None	212	4–22	2–7
28	April 6	at Michigan	Ray Fisher Stadium • Ann Arbor, Michigan	6–3	Myer (1–4)	Cleveland (1–2)	Miller (1)	579	5–22	2–7
29	April 9	at Milwaukee	Franklin Field • Franklin, Wisconsin	5–4	Spencer (2–2)	Frey (3–2)	Miller (2)	447	6–22	3–7
30	April 9	at Milwaukee	Franklin Field • Franklin, Wisconsin	7–0	Myer (2–4)	Blubaugh (3–2)	None	447	7–22	4–7
31	April 10	at Milwaukee	Franklin Field • Franklin, Wisconsin	7–6	Skelton (1–0)	Edwards (0–2)	Wilson (1)	416	8–22	5–7
–	April 12	at Purdue	Alexander Field • West Lafayette, Indiana	Game postponed						
32	April 14	at Northern Kentucky	Bill Aker Baseball Complex • Highland Heights, Kentucky	9–5	Deany (2–1)	Gerl (2–5)	None	112	9–22	6–7
33	April 15	at Northern Kentucky	Bill Aker Baseball Complex • Highland Heights, Kentucky	4–5	Lonsbury (3–0)	Robison (0–1)	None	154	9–23	6–8
34	April 16	at Northern Kentucky	Bill Aker Baseball Complex • Highland Heights, Kentucky	10–5	Skelton (2–0)	Echeman (1–6)	None	213	10–23	7–8
35	April 20	at No. 18 Notre Dame	Frank Eck Stadium • Notre Dame, Indiana	2–12	Simon (1–0)	Madura (0–1)	None	208	10–24	7–8
36	April 22	Northern Kentucky	Mastodon Field • Fort Wayne, Indiana	4–2	Deany (3–1)	Klingenbeck (2–2)	Miller (3)	121	11–24	8–8
37	April 22	Northern Kentucky	Mastodon Field • Fort Wayne, Indiana	4–3	Skelton (3–0)	Lonsbury (3–2)	None	121	12–24	9–8
38	April 24	Oakland	Mastodon Field • Fort Wayne, Indiana	6–8	Kujawa (1–1)	Wilson (1–2)	Stelling (2)	144	12–25	9–9
39	April 24	Oakland	Mastodon Field • Fort Wayne, Indiana	7–9	Paugn (4–1)	Miller (0–8)	None	120	12–26	9–10
40	April 27	at Michigan State	Drayton McLane Baseball Stadium at John H. Kobs Field • East Lansing, Michigan	4–7	Arbaugh (1–0)	Hayden (0–1)	Bischoff (9)	235	12–27	9–10
41	April 29	UIC	Mastodon Field • Fort Wayne, Indiana	3–7	Peterson (4–3)	Deany (3–2)	None	148	12–28	9–11
42	April 30	UIC	Mastodon Field • Fort Wayne, Indiana	2–4	Ingram (3–4)	Myer (2–5)	Shears (7)	122	12–29	9–13

May (6–6)

#	Date	Opponent	Site/stadium	Score	Win	Loss	Save	Attendance	Overall record	Horizon record
43	May 1	UIC	Mastodon Field • Fort Wayne, Indiana	5–21	Lopez (5–3)	Spencer (2–3)	None	167	12–30	9–13
44	May 6	at Youngstown State	Eastwood Field • Niles, Ohio	Game canceled						
45	May 6	at Youngstown State	Eastwood Field • Niles, Ohio	Game canceled						
46	May 8	at UIC	Les Miller Field at Curtis Granderson Stadium • Chicago, Illinois	3–2	Deany (4–2)	Lopez (5–4)	None	211	13–30	10–13
47	May 8	at UIC	Les Miller Field at Curtis Granderson Stadium • Chicago, Illinois	3–11	Zahora (2–2)	Spencer (3–3)	None	187	13–31	10–14
48	May 10	at Dayton	Woerner Field • Dayton, Ohio	5–8	Maue (1–1)	Robison (0–2)	Meyer (1)	57	13–32	10–14
49	May 13	Milwaukee	Mastodon Field • Fort Wayne, Indiana	2–1	Skelton (4–0)	Frey (4–5)	None	188	14–32	11–14
50	May 13	Milwaukee	Mastodon Field • Fort Wayne, Indiana	14–4	Miller (1–8)	DeYoung (0–2)	None	189	15–32	12–14
51	May 14	at Wright State	Nischwitz Stadium • Dayton, Ohio	5–4	Deany (5–2)	Shirk (5–5)	Skelton (1)	314	16–32	13–14
52	May 14	at Wright State	Nischwitz Stadium • Dayton, Ohio	3–17	Gongora (4–1)	Myer (2–6)	None	341	16–33	13–15
53	May 17	Butler	Mastodon Field • Fort Wayne, Indiana	4–2	Wilson (2–2)	MacCauley (3–4)	Stills (1)	197	17–33	13–15
54	May 20	at Akron	Skeeles Field • Akron, Ohio	6–5	Stills (2–2)	Heydinger (2–10)	Miller (4)	175	18–33	13–15
55	May 20	at Akron	Skeeles Field • Akron, Ohio	6–7	Dietrich (3–1)	Madura (0–2)	None	175	18–34	13–15
56	May 21	at Akron	Skeeles Field • Akron, Ohio	0–11	Steinbaugh (2–3)	Spencer (2–5)	None	215	18–35	13–15

Postseason
HL Tournament (0–1)

#	Date	Opponent	Site/stadium	Score	Win	Loss	Save	Attendance	Overall record	Horizon record
57	May 25	vs Youngstown State	Nischwitz Stadium • Dayton, Ohio	0–11	Brosky (6–7)	Deany (5–3)	None	122	18–36	0–1

== Awards ==
=== Horizon League Players of the Week ===
Weekly Awards
Player	Award	Date Awarded	Ref.
Jacob Myer	Pitcher of the Week	April 12, 2022	

=== Conference awards ===
Awards
Player	Award	Date Awarded	Ref.
Cade Fitzpatrick	Second team All-Horizon League	May 24, 2022	
Jack Lang	Second team All-Horizon League	May 24, 2022	
Rex Stills	Freshman team All-Horizon League	May 24, 2022	
