= 2022 Youngstown State Penguins baseball team =

Youngstown State University baseball team

2022 Youngstown State Penguins baseball
- Conference: Horizon League
- Record: 21–36 (12–16 Horizon)
- Head coach: Dan Bertolini (6th season)
- Assistant coach: Jake Marinelli (1st season)
- Hitting coach: Eric Bunnell (4th season)
- Pitching coach: Shane Davis (4th season)
- Home stadium: Eastwood Field

2022 Horizon League baseball standings
	Conf.				Overall
Team	W		L	PCT	W		L	PCT
Wright State ‍†‍‡‍^{y}	20	–	9	.690	30	–	25	.545
Oakland ‍‍‍	18	–	11	.621	31	–	27	.534
UIC ‍‍‍	14	–	11	.560	22	–	25	.468
Purdue Fort Wayne ‍‍‍	13	–	15	.464	18	–	36	.333
Youngstown State ‍‍‍	12	–	16	.429	21	–	36	.368
Northern Kentucky ‍‍‍	11	–	17	.393	19	–	35	.352
Milwaukee ‍‍‍	9	–	17	.346	20	–	29	.408
† – Conference champion ‡ – Tournament champion y – Invited to the NCAA tournament Rankings from D1Baseball

The 2022 Youngstown State Penguins baseball team was a baseball team that represented Youngstown State University in the 2022 NCAA Division I baseball season. The Penguins were members of the Horizon League and played their home games at Eastwood Field in Niles, Ohio. They were led by sixth-year head coach Dan Bertolini.

== Previous season ==
The Penguins finished the 2021 NCAA Division I baseball season 32–24 overall (24–16 conference) and third place in the conference standings. It was their first winning season since 2005, and their first thirty win season since 1995.

== Roster ==
2022 Youngstown State Penguins baseball team
Players
Coaches

#	Pos.	Name	B/T	Height	Weight	Year	Previous school	Home town
1	OF	Lucas Nasonti	R/R	5 ft 10 in (1.78 m)	180 lb (82 kg)	Sr	Champion H. S.	Warren, Ohio
2	INF	Eli Brown	R/R	5 ft 6 in (1.68 m)	155 lb (70 kg)	Fr	Bowling Green H. S.	Bowling Green, Ohio
3	C	Jack Johnson	S/R	5 ft 9 in (1.75 m)	180 lb (82 kg)	Fr	Katy H. S.	Katy, Texas
4	INF	Steven D'Eusanio	R/R	6 ft 0 in (1.83 m)	210 lb (95 kg)	Sr	South H. S.	Willoughby, Ohio
5	OF	Dominick Bucko	S/R	6 ft 0 in (1.83 m)	205 lb (93 kg)	Sr	Cuyahoga Community College	Saxonburg, Pennsylvania
7	C	Ian Francis	R/R	6 ft 1 in (1.85 m)	185 lb (84 kg)	Fr	Cardinal Mooney H. S.	Poland, Ohio
8	RHP	Brandon Mikos	R/R	6 ft 4 in (1.93 m)	190 lb (86 kg)	Fr	South Range H. S.	Canfield, Ohio
9	RHP	Jon Snyder	R/R	6 ft 5 in (1.96 m)	190 lb (86 kg)	RS Sr	Springboro H. S.	Springboro, Ohio
10	INF	Trey Law	L/R	5 ft 11 in (1.8 m)	165 lb (75 kg)	RS So	Cedar Cliff H. S.	Camp Hill, Pennsylvania
11	OF	Andre Good	L/R	5 ft 9 in (1.75 m)	175 lb (79 kg)	So	Steel Valley H. S.	Munhall, Pennsylvania
12	INF	Seth Lucero	L/R	6 ft 2 in (1.88 m)	185 lb (84 kg)	So	Dawson Community College	Arvada, Colorado
13		Chase Franken	L/R	5 ft 9 in (1.75 m)	175 lb (79 kg)	RS Fr	Columbiana H. S.	Salem, Ohio
14	LHP	Danny Zimmerman	L/L	6 ft 0 in (1.83 m)	210 lb (95 kg)	Jr	Wabash Valley College	Frankfort, Illinois
15	RHP	Mitchell Seymour	R/R	6 ft 0 in (1.83 m)	175 lb (79 kg)	Fr	Springfield Local H. S.	New Springfield, Ohio
16	RHP	Casey Marshalwitz	L/R	6 ft 1 in (1.85 m)	175 lb (79 kg)	Jr	Hampton H. S.	Gibsonia, Pennsylvania
17	RHP	Lane Rhodes	R/R	6 ft 3 in (1.91 m)	195 lb (88 kg)	Fr	Salem H. S.	Salem, Ohio
18	RHP	Eric Luebcke	R/R	6 ft 1 in (1.85 m)	170 lb (77 kg)	RS So	Monsignor McClancy Memorial H. S.	Astoria, New York
19	C	Dylan Swarmer	R/R	5 ft 11 in (1.8 m)	195 lb (88 kg)	Sr	Knoch H. S.	Saxonburg, Pennsylvania
20	RHP	A. J. Clegg	R/R	6 ft 1 in (1.85 m)	195 lb (88 kg)	So	Toronto H. S.	Toronto, Ohio
21	OF	Turner Grau	L/R	6 ft 4 in (1.93 m)	180 lb (82 kg)	Jr	Avonworth H. S.	Pittsburgh, Pennsylvania
22	RHP	Brandon Matthews	R/R	6 ft 3 in (1.91 m)	170 lb (77 kg)	Sr	Punxsutawney H. S.	Punxsutawney, Pennsylvania
23	INF	Braeden O'Shaughnessy	R/R	6 ft 3 in (1.91 m)	180 lb (82 kg)	Jr	Poland Seminary H. S.	Poland, Ohio
24	RHP	Will Shaffer	R/R	6 ft 3 in (1.91 m)	210 lb (95 kg)	RS Fr	Laurel H. S.	New Castle, Pennsylvania
25	INF	Padraig O'Shaughnessy	L/L	5 ft 10 in (1.78 m)	205 lb (93 kg)	RS Sr	Mercyhurst North East	Poland, Ohio
26	RHP	Nick Perez	R/R	5 ft 11 in (1.8 m)	155 lb (70 kg)	So	St. Francis Preparatory School	Bayside, New York
27	LHP	Nathan Ball	L/L	6 ft 3 in (1.91 m)	190 lb (86 kg)	Jr	Perrysburg H. S.	Perrysburg, Ohio
28	RHP	Matt Brosky	R/R	5 ft 10 in (1.78 m)	190 lb (86 kg)	Jr	Strongsville H. S.	Strongsville, Ohio
29	INF	Jake Ellowitz	R/R	5 ft 9 in (1.75 m)	180 lb (82 kg)	RS Sr	Mohawk Valley Community College	Atlantic Beach, New York
30	LHP	Daniel Morehead	L/L	6 ft 1 in (1.85 m)	180 lb (82 kg)	RS Fr	Cardinal Newman H. S.	Santa Rosa, California
32	RHP	Chad Cole	R/R	6 ft 3 in (1.91 m)	215 lb (98 kg)	Sr	Norwin H. S.	North Huntingdon, Pennsylvania
33		Travis Perry	R/R	6 ft 7 in (2.01 m)	240 lb (109 kg)	Sr	Rocky Grove H. S.	Oil City, Pennsylvania
34	LHP	Kenny Misik	L/L	5 ft 11 in (1.8 m)	205 lb (93 kg)	RS So	Austintown Fitch H. S.	Austintown, Ohio
35	OF	Austin Earl	R/R	5 ft 11 in (1.8 m)	210 lb (95 kg)	Sr	Archbishop Murphy H. S.	Everett, Washington
36	OF	Pete Panko	R/R	6 ft 0 in (1.83 m)	200 lb (91 kg)	Sr	Jesuit College Preparatory School of Dallas	Allen, Texas
37	RHP	Zach Stayduhar	R/R	6 ft 4 in (1.93 m)	165 lb (75 kg)	Fr	West Allegheny H. S.	Coraopolis, Pennsylvania
38	C	John Ritter	R/R	6 ft 2 in (1.88 m)	210 lb (95 kg)	Sr	Springfield Local H. S.	New Middletown, Ohio
40		Jake Brazzano	R/R	5 ft 10 in (1.78 m)	165 lb (75 kg)	Fr	IMG Academy	Blairstown, New Jersey
41		Andrew Russell	L/R	6 ft 1 in (1.85 m)	190 lb (86 kg)	Jr	Champion H. S.	Champion, Ohio
42	RHP	Alex Cordona	R/R	5 ft 8 in (1.73 m)	175 lb (79 kg)	RS Jr	Mercyhurst North East	Boardman, Ohio
44	INF	Vince D'Eusanio	L/R	6 ft 2 in (1.88 m)	220 lb (100 kg)	Fr	South H. S.	Willoughby, Ohio

Head coach

6 Dan Bertolini

Assistant coach(es)

Jake Marinelli

Hitting coach(es)

Eric Bunnell

Pitching coach(es)

Shane Davis

Legend

- (C) Team captain
- (S) Suspended
- (I) Ineligible
- Injured
- Current redshirt

Roster

== Schedule ==
2022 Youngstown State Penguins baseball game log
Regular season
February (2–5)

#	Date	Opponent	Site/stadium	Score	Win	Loss	Save	Attendance	Overall record	Horizon record
1	February 18	at Bethune–Cookman	Radiology Associates Field at Jackie Robinson Ballpark • Daytona Beach, Florida	1–3	Lipthratt (1–0)	Snyder (0–1)	Vazquez (1)	312	0–1	–
2	February 19	at Bethune–Cookman	Radiology Associates Field at Jackie Robinson Ballpark • Daytona Beach, Florida	7–6	Perez (1–0)	Santos (0–1)	Ball (1)	218	1–1	–
3	February 20	at Bethune–Cookman	Radiology Associates Field at Jackie Robinson Ballpark • Daytona Beach, Florida	10–9	Brosky (1–0)	Gonzalez (0–1)	Ball (2)	295	2–1	–
4	February 25	at Belmont	E. S. Rose Park • Nashville, Tennessee	1–3	South (1–0)	Snyder (0–2)	Brennan (2)	117	2–2	–
5	February 26	at Belmont	E. S. Rose Park • Nashville, Tennessee	0–4	Perry (0–1)	Bean (2–0)	None	120	2–3	–
6	February 26	at Belmont	E. S. Rose Park • Nashville, Tennessee	2–5	Baratta (2–0)	Coles (0–1)	Brennan (3)	120	2–4	–
7	February 27	at Belmont	E. S. Rose Park • Nashville, Tennessee	0–2	Jenkins (1–0)	Brosky (1–1)	Brennan (4)	130	2–5	–

March (7–10)

#	Date	Opponent	Site/stadium	Score	Win	Loss	Save	Attendance	Overall record	Horizon record
8	March 4	at Texas–Rio Grande Valley	UTRGV Baseball Stadium • Edinburg, Texas	4–6	Stevens (2–0)	Snyder (0–3)	Gerik Jr. (1)	1,591	2–6	–
9	March 5	at Texas–Rio Grande Valley	UTRGV Baseball Stadium • Edinburg, Texas	4–8	Davis (2–0)	Ball (0–1)	None	1,318	2–7	–
10	March 5	at Texas–Rio Grande Valley	UTRGV Baseball Stadium • Edinburg, Texas	8–11	Rosenbaum (1–0)	Perez (0–1)	Balderrama Jr. (1)	1,318	2–8	–
11	March 6	at Texas–Rio Grande Valley	UTRGV Baseball Stadium • Edinburg, Texas	3–2	Marshalwitz (1–0)	Aldaz (0–1)	Ball (3)	847	3–8	–
12	March 11	at New Orleans	Maestri Field at Privateer Park • New Orleans, Louisiana	6–5	Milkos (1–0)	Seroski (1–1)	Ball (4)	145	4–8	–
13	March 12	at New Orleans	Maestri Field at Privateer Park • New Orleans, Louisiana	7–8	Gauthe (1–0)	Ball (0–2)	None	244	4–9	–
14	March 12	at New Orleans	Maestri Field at Privateer Park • New Orleans, Louisiana	3–2	Perry (1–1)	Mitchell (0–1)	Perez (1)	658	5–9	–
15	March 13	at New Orleans	Maestri Field at Privateer Park • New Orleans, Louisiana	0–1	Williams (3–0)	Brosky (1–2)	None	475	5–10	–
16	March 16	at Pittsburgh	Petersen Sports Complex • Pittsburgh, Pennsylvania	5–2	Mikos (2–0)	Miller (0–1)	None	240	6–10	–
17	March 18	at Purdue Fort Wayne	Mastodon Field • Fort Wayne, Indiana	4–0	Snyder (1–3)	Stills (0–2)	None	174	7–10	1–0
18	March 20	vs Purdue Fort Wayne	Defiance High School • Defiance, Ohio	7–8	Wilson (1–1)	Marshalwitz (1–1)	None	125	7–11	1–1
19	March 20	vs Purdue Fort Wayne	Defiance High School • Defiance, Ohio	12–6	Brosky (2–2)	Miller (0–5)	None	155	8–11	2–1
20	March 22	at Penn State	Medlar Field • University Park, Pennsylvania	2–1	Cardona (1–0)	Mellott (1–2)	Ball (5)	338	9–11	2–1
21	March 24	at West Virginia	Monongalia County Ballpark • Granville, West Virginia	4–6	Bravo (1–0)	Rhodes (0–1)	Braithwaite (1)	1,379	9–12	2–1
22	March 25	at West Virginia	Monongalia County Ballpark • Granville, West Virginia	3–9	Hampton (4–1)	Coles (0–2)	None	1,030	9–13	2–1
23	March 25	at West Virginia	Monongalia County Ballpark • Granville, West Virginia	2–13	Watters (2–1)	Brosky (2–3)	None	1,066	9–14	2–1
24	March 30	at Michigan State	Drayton McLane Baseball Stadium at John H. Kobs Field • East Lansing, Michigan	5–12	Carson (2–0)	Perez (1–2)	None	155	9–15	2–1

April (3–12)

#	Date	Opponent	Site/stadium	Score	Win	Loss	Save	Attendance	Overall record	Horizon record
25	April 1	at Oakland	Oakland Baseball Field • Rochester, Michigan	6–11	Hagen (3–1)	Snyder (1–4)	None	115	9–16	2–2
26	April 2	at Oakland	Oakland Baseball Field • Rochester, Michigan	4–2	Cole (1–2)	Decker (2–2)	None	127	10–16	3–2
27	April 3	at Oakland	Oakland Baseball Field • Rochester, Michigan	1–14	Densmore (2–0)	Brosky (2–4)	None	145	10–17	3–3
28	April 5	at Ohio State	Bill Davis Stadium • Columbus, Ohio	4–5	Johnson (1–2)	Ball (0–3)	None	490	10–18	3–3
29	April 6	Pittsburgh	Eastwood Field • Niles, Ohio	1–9	Devereux (3–0)	Perez (1–3)	None	165	10–19	3–3
30	April 8	Northern Kentucky	Eastwood Field • Niles, Ohio	0–9	Bohlen (1–0)	Snyder (1–5)	Gerl (1)	157	10–20	3–4
31	April 9	Northern Kentucky	Eastwood Field • Niles, Ohio	3–15	Klingenbeck (2–4)	Mikos (2–1)	Longsbury (3)	153	10–21	3–5
32	April 10	Northern Kentucky	Eastwood Field • Niles, Ohio	7–9	Echeman (1–5)	Brosky (2–5)	Mulhern (1)	193	10–22	3–6
33	April 12	Niagara	Eastwood Field • Niles, Ohio	3–5	Krawiec (1–0)	Cardona (1–1)	Cameron (1)	170	10–23	3–6
34	April 14	Milwaukee	Eastwood Field • Niles, Ohio	4–2	Coles (2–2)	Frey (3–3)	Ball (7)	211	11–23	4–6
35	April 15	Milwaukee	Eastwood Field • Niles, Ohio	13–17	Kaufmann (1–0)	Marshalwitz (1–2)	None	195	11–24	4–7
36	April 16	Milwaukee	Eastwood Field • Niles, Ohio	15–4	Brosky (3–5)	Gilhaus (1–3)	None	210	12–24	5–7
–	April 19	at Kent State	Schoonover Stadium • Kent, Ohio	Game cancelled						
37	April 22	Oakland	Eastwood Field • Niles, Ohio	2–1	Brosky (4–4)	Decker (3–4)	None	213	13–24	6–7
38	April 22	Oakland	Eastwood Field • Niles, Ohio	2–1	Perry (2–1)	Densmore (3–2)	None	213	14–24	7–7
39	April 24	at Milwaukee	Franklin Field • Franklin, Wisconsin	11–2	Coles (3–2)	Schulfer (2–2)	None	423	15–24	8–7
40	April 24	at Milwaukee	Franklin Field • Franklin, Wisconsin	4–17	Turnquist (1–0)	Rhodes (0–2)	None	423	15–25	8–8
41	April 26	at Niagara	Bobo Field • Lewiston, New York	1–3	Laird (1–2)	Perez (1–3)	Erwin (2)	112	15–26	8–8
42	April 29	at Wright State	Nischwitz Stadium • Dayton, Ohio	3–4	Shirk (5–4)	Brosky (4–6)	Luikart (5)	137	15–27	8–9
43	April 30	at Wright State	Nischwitz Stadium • Dayton, Ohio	3–10	Gongora (3–1)	Perry (2–2)	None	318	15–28	8–10

May (4–6)

#	Date	Opponent	Site/stadium	Score	Win	Loss	Save	Attendance	Overall record	Horizon record
44	May 1	at Wright State	Nischwitz Stadium • Dayton, Ohio	3–10	Theis (4–0)	Coles (3–3)	None	231	15–30	8–11
–	May 3	at Michigan	Ray Fisher Stadium • Ann Arbor, Michigan	Game cancelled						
–	May 6	Purdue Fort Wayne	Eastwood Field • Niles, Ohio	Game cancelled						
–	May 6	Purdue Fort Wayne	Eastwood Field • Niles, Ohio	Game cancelled						
45	May 8	Wright State	Eastwood Field • Niles, Ohio	1–3	Theis (5–0)	Brosky (4–7)	Luikart (6)	311	15–30	8–12
46	May 8	Wright State	Eastwood Field • Niles, Ohio	6–9	Haught (3–1)	Coles (3–4)	Nonte	311	15–31	8–13
47	May 13	at UIC	Les Miller Field at Curtis Granderson Stadium • Chicago, Illinois	8–3	Brosky (5–7)	Peterson (4–5)	None	249	16–31	9–13
48	May 13	at UIC	Les Miller Field at Curtis Granderson Stadium • Chicago, Illinois	3–7	Ingram (4–4)	Rhodes (0–3)	None	298	16–32	9–14
49	May 15	at Northern Kentucky	Bill Aker Baseball Complex • Highland Heights, Kentucky	5–3	Coles (4–4)	Gerl (3–6)	Ball (9)	117	17–32	10–14
50	May 15	at Northern Kentucky	Bill Aker Baseball Complex • Highland Heights, Kentucky	0–8	Klingenbeck (3–6)	Perry (2–3)	None	98	17–33	10–15
51	May 19	UIC	Eastwood Field • Niles, Ohio	6–4	Ball (1–3)	Zack (2–2)	None	201	18–33	11–15
52	May 20	UIC	Eastwood Field • Niles, Ohio	10–6	Perry (3–3)	Morris (1–2)	Coles (1)	3,583	19–33	12–15
53	May 21	UIC	Eastwood Field • Niles, Ohio	6–18	Torres (2–2)	Rhodes (0–4)	None	214	19–34	12–16

Postseason
Horizon Tournament (2–2)

#	Date	Opponent	Site/stadium	Score	Win	Loss	Save	Attendance	Overall record	Horizon record
54	May 25	vs Purdue Fort Wayne	Nischwitz Stadium • Dayton, Ohio	6–0	Brosky (6–7)	Deany (5–3)	None	122	20–34	1–0
55	May 26	vs Oakland	Nischwitz Stadium • Dayton, Ohio	0–2	Kujawa (4–1)	Coles (4–5)	Decker (3)	173	20–35	1–1
56	May 26	vs Northern Kentucky	Nischwitz Stadium • Dayton, Ohio	11–7	Perry (4–3)	Echeman (2–9)	None	187	21–35	2–1
57	May 27	vs Oakland	Nischwitz Stadium • Dayton, Ohio	2–4	Densmore (5–3)	Ball (1–4)	Decker (4)	156	21–36	2–2

== Awards ==
=== Horizon League Players of the Week ===
Weekly Awards
Player	Award	Date Awarded	Ref.
Seth Lucero	Player of the Week	March 22, 2022	
Jon Snyder	Co-Pitcher of the Week	March 22, 2022	

=== Conference awards ===
Awards
Player	Award	Date Awarded	Ref.
Braeden O’Shaughnessy	First team All-Horizon League	May 24, 2022	
Matt Brosky	First team All-Horizon League	May 24, 2022	
