= 2023 Youngstown State Penguins baseball team =

Baseball team that represents Youngstown State University

2023 Youngstown State Penguins baseball
- Conference: Horizon League
- Record: 19–36 (13–16 Horizon)
- Head coach: Dan Bertolini (7th season)
- Assistant coach: Collin Floyd (1st season)
- Hitting coach: Eric Bunnell (5th season)
- Pitching coach: Shane Davis (5th season)
- Home stadium: Eastwood Field

2023 Horizon League baseball standings
	Conf.				Overall
Team	W		L	PCT	W		L	PCT
Wright State ‍†‍‡‍^{y}	22	–	8	.733	39	–	21	.650
Oakland ‍‍‍	18	–	12	.600	29	–	31	.483
Northern Kentucky ‍‍‍	17	–	13	.567	30	–	27	.526
Youngstown State ‍‍‍	13	–	16	.448	19	–	36	.345
Milwaukee ‍‍‍	11	–	18	.379	25	–	32	.439
Purdue Fort Wayne ‍‍‍	8	–	22	.267	13	–	43	.232
† – Conference champion ‡ – Tournament champion y – Invited to the NCAA Tournament; As of May 27, 2023; Rankings from D1Baseball

The 2023 Youngstown State Penguins baseball team was a baseball team that represented Youngstown State University in the 2023 NCAA Division I baseball season. The Penguins were members of the Horizon League and played their home games at Eastwood Field in Niles, Ohio. They were led by seventh-year head coach Dan Bertolini.

== Previous season ==
The Penguins finished the 2022 NCAA Division I baseball season 21–36 overall (12–16 conference) and fifth place in the conference standings, qualifying for the 2022 Horizon League Baseball Tournament, where they were eliminated in the semi-finals after going 2–2.

== Preseason ==
Following the season, Jake Marinelli left to take the head baseball coaching position with Keuka College. On August 4, 2022, Marinelli was replaced by former Penguin's pitcher, Collin Floyd.

== Preseason Horizon poll ==
For the 2023 poll, Youngstown State was projected to finish in fourth in the Conference.

Media poll
Predicted finish	Team	Votes (1st place)
1	Wright State	41 (5)
2	Oakland	29
3	Milwaukee	28
4	Youngstown State	24
5	Northern Kentucky	21 (1)
6	Purdue Fort Wayne	19

== Roster ==
2023 Youngstown State Penguins baseball team
Players
Coaches

#	Pos.	Name	B/T	Height	Weight	Year	Previous school	Home town
1	INF	Trey Law	L/R	6 ft 0 in (1.83 m)	180 lb (82 kg)	RS Jr	Cedar Cliff H. S.	Camp Hill, Pennsylvania
2	INF	Eli Brown	R/R	5 ft 6 in (1.68 m)	170 lb (77 kg)	So	Bowling Green H. S.	Bowling Green, Ohio
3	C	Jack Johnson	S/R	5 ft 7 in (1.7 m)	170 lb (77 kg)	RS Fr	Katy H. S.	Katy, Texas
4	INF	Steven D'Eusanio	R/R	6 ft 0 in (1.83 m)	210 lb (95 kg)	RS Sr	South H. S.	Willoughby, Ohio
5	INF	Matt Thompson	R/R	6 ft 2 in (1.88 m)	190 lb (86 kg)	Fr	Wadsworth H. S.	Wadsworth, Ohio
7	C	Ian Francis	R/R	6 ft 1 in (1.85 m)	195 lb (88 kg)	So	Cardinal Mooney H. S.	Poland, Ohio
8	RHP	Brandon Mikos	R/R	6 ft 4 in (1.93 m)	190 lb (86 kg)	So	South Range H. S.	Canfield, Ohio
9	RHP	Tyler Barni	R/R	6 ft 6 in (1.98 m)	235 lb (107 kg)	Fr	Walsh Jesuit H. S.	Twinsburg, Ohio
10	INF	Joe Suarez	R/R	5 ft 8 in (1.73 m)	175 lb (79 kg)	So	Harford Community College	Falls Church, Virginia
11	OF	Andre Good	L/R	5 ft 9 in (1.75 m)	180 lb (82 kg)	Sr	Steel Valley H. S.	Munhall, Pennsylvania
12	INF	Seth Lucero	L/R	6 ft 2 in (1.88 m)	185 lb (84 kg)	Jr	Dawson Community College	Arvada, Colorado
13	UTL	Chase Franken	L/R	5 ft 9 in (1.75 m)	175 lb (79 kg)	RS So	Columbiana H. S.	Salem, Ohio
15	RHP	Mitchell Seymour	R/R	6 ft 0 in (1.83 m)	175 lb (79 kg)	RS Fr	Springfield Local H. S.	New Springfield, Ohio
16	RHP	Casey Marshalwitz	L/R	6 ft 2 in (1.88 m)	200 lb (91 kg)	Sr	Hampton H. S.	Gibsonia, Pennsylvania
17	RHP	Lane Rhodes	R/R	6 ft 3 in (1.91 m)	195 lb (88 kg)	So	Salem H. S.	Salem, Ohio
18	C	Carter Kocik	R/R	6 ft 0 in (1.83 m)	190 lb (86 kg)	Fr	Black River H. S.	West Salem, Ohio
19	C	Eddie Saucedo	L/R	6 ft 0 in (1.83 m)	200 lb (91 kg)	Jr	Madison Area Technical College	Oregon, Wisconsin
20	UTL	Aidan Dunlap	R/R	5 ft 11 in (1.8 m)	175 lb (79 kg)	Fr	Hempfield Area H. S.	Irwin, Pennsylvania
21	OF	Turner Grau	L/R	6 ft 4 in (1.93 m)	195 lb (88 kg)	Sr	Avonworth H. S.	Pittsburgh, Pennsylvania
22	RHP	Zach Stayduhar	R/R	6 ft 4 in (1.93 m)	165 lb (75 kg)	RS Fr	West Allegheny H. S.	Coraopolis, Pennsylvania
23	INF	Braeden O'Shaughnessy	R/R	6 ft 3 in (1.91 m)	180 lb (82 kg)	Sr	Poland Seminary H. S.	Poland, Ohio
24	RHP	Will Shaffer	R/R	6 ft 3 in (1.91 m)	215 lb (98 kg)	RS So	Laurel H. S.	New Castle, Pennsylvania
25	INF	Padraig O'Shaughnessy	L/L	5 ft 10 in (1.78 m)	205 lb (93 kg)	RS Sr	Mercyhurst North East	Poland, Ohio
26	RHP	Nick Perez	R/R	5 ft 11 in (1.8 m)	185 lb (84 kg)	Jr	St. Francis Preparatory School	Bayside, New York
27	RHP	Aidan English	R/R	6 ft 6 in (1.98 m)	195 lb (88 kg)	Fr	South Range H. S.	North Lima, Ohio
28	OF	Jason Triveri	L/L	6 ft 3 in (1.91 m)	220 lb (100 kg)	Fr	Boardman H. S.	Boardman, Ohio
29	UTL	Trey Pancake	R/R	5 ft 9 in (1.75 m)	165 lb (75 kg)	So	South Range H. S.	Negley, Ohio
30	INF	Clay Wiesen	R/R	5 ft 9 in (1.75 m)	170 lb (77 kg)	Fr	Hickory H. S.	Hermitage, Pennsylvania
31	RHP	Patrick Gumto	R/R	6 ft 3 in (1.91 m)	215 lb (98 kg)	RS Sr	Shaler Area H. S.	Allison Park, Pennsylvania
33	UTL	Travis Perry	R/R	6 ft 7 in (2.01 m)	240 lb (109 kg)	RS Sr	Rocky Grove H. S.	Oil City, Pennsylvania
34	LHP	Kenny Misik	L/L	5 ft 11 in (1.8 m)	205 lb (93 kg)	RS Jr	Austintown Fitch H. S.	Austintown, Ohio
35	LHP	Braden Gebhardt	L/L	6 ft 2 in (1.88 m)	220 lb (100 kg)	Fr	Howland H. S.	Howland, Ohio
37	OF	R. J. Sherwood	R/R	6 ft 1 in (1.85 m)	190 lb (86 kg)	Jr	Kellogg Community College	Canton, Michigan
40	RHP	Brandin Anderson	R/R	6 ft 0 in (1.83 m)	215 lb (98 kg)	Fr	Central Catholic H. S.	Weedville, Pennsylvania
41	LHP	Cam Marshalwitz	L/L	6 ft 1 in (1.85 m)	180 lb (82 kg)	Fr	Hampton H. S.	Gibsonia, Pennsylvania
44	INF	Vince D'Eusanio	L/R	6 ft 2 in (1.88 m)	220 lb (100 kg)	RS Fr	South H. S.	Willoughby, Ohio

Head coach

6 Dan Bertolini

Assistant coach(es)

Collin Floyd

Hitting coach(es)

Eric Bunnell

Pitching coach(es)

Shane Davis

Legend

- (C) Team captain
- (S) Suspended
- (I) Ineligible
- Injured
- Current redshirt

Roster

== Schedule ==
2023 Youngstown State Penguins baseball game log
Regular season
February (1–7)

#	Date	Rank	Opponent	Site/stadium	Score	Win	Loss	Save	Attendance	Overall record	Horizon record
1	February 17		vs Illinois	David F. Couch Ballpark • Winston-Salem, North Carolina	6–9	Constertina (1–0)	Shaffer (0–1)	Vera (1)	164	0–1	–
2	February 17		at #5 Wake Forest	David F. Couch Ballpark • Winston-Salem, North Carolina	3–9	Keener (1–0)	Mikos (0–1)	None	1,004	0–2	–
3	February 18		vs Illinois	David F. Couch Ballpark • Winston-Salem, North Carolina	5–10	Wenninger (1–0)	Perez (0–1)	None	172	0–3	–
4	February 19		at #5 Wake Forest	David F. Couch Ballpark • Winston-Salem, North Carolina	3–18	Massey (1–0)	Shaffer (0–2)	None	307	0–4	–
5	February 24		at Memphis	FedExPark • Memphis, Tennessee	6–2	Perry (1–0)	Fowler (0–1)	Gumto (1)	244	1–4	–
6	February 25		at Memphis	FedExPark • Memphis, Tennessee	9–13	Warren (2–0)	Perez (0–2)	None	212	1–5	–
7	February 25		at Memphis	FedExPark • Memphis, Tennessee	1–3	Durham (1–0)	Mikos (0–2)	Kendrick (1)	267	1–6	–
8	February 26		at Memphis	FedExPark • Memphis, Tennessee	5–6	Kendrick (1–0)	Gumto (0–1)	None	296	1–7	–

March (4–12)

#	Date	Rank	Opponent	Site/stadium	Score	Win	Loss	Save	Attendance	Overall record	Horizon record
9	March 3		at Baylor	Baylor Ballpark • Waco, Texas	7–5	Anderson (1–0)	Stasio (1–2)	Cas. Marshalwitz (1)	1,916	2–7	–
10	March 4		at Baylor	Baylor Ballpark • Waco, Texas	5–12	Petrowski (1–0)	Misik (0–1)	None	2,045	2–8	–
11	March 4		at Baylor	Baylor Ballpark • Waco, Texas	7–5	English (1–0)	Oliver (1–1)	None	2,045	3–8	–
12	March 5		at Baylor	Baylor Ballpark • Waco, Texas	7–9	Calder (1–0)	Gebhardt (0–1)	Golomb (1)	1,709	3–9	–
13	March 7		at Kent State	Schoonover Stadium • Kent, Ohio	1–22	Longwell (1–0)	Anderson (1–1)	None	221	3–10	–
14	March 10		at Kansas State	Tointon Family Stadium • Manhattan, Kansas	4–20	Boerema (2–0)	Perry (1–1)	None	1,183	3–11	–
15	March 11		at Kansas State	Tointon Family Stadium • Manhattan, Kansas	6–9	Hartis (2–0)	Pancake (0–1)	Neighbors (1)	1,212	3–12	–
16	March 12		at Kansas State	Tointon Family Stadium • Manhattan, Kansas	2–16	Buss (1–0)	English (1–1)	None	1,268	3–13	–
17	March 16		Oakland	Eastwood Field • Niles, Ohio	18–3	Perry (2–1)	Konitzer (1–1)	None	315	4–13	1–0
18	March 17		Oakland	Eastwood Field • Niles, Ohio	10–13	Decker (3–1)	Misik (0–2)	None	205	4–14	1–1
19	March 17		Oakland	Eastwood Field • Niles, Ohio	2–5	Densmore (1–2)	English (1–2)	None	205	4–15	1–2
20	March 22		at Bowling Green	Steller Field • Bowling Green, Ohio	6–18	Turner (1–0)	Anderson (1–2)	None	112	4–16	–
21	March 24		at Milwaukee	Franklin Field • Franklin, Wisconsin	2–1	Perry (3–1)	Frey (2–3)	Gebhardt (1)	198	5–16	2–2
22	March 24		at Milwaukee	Franklin Field • Franklin, Wisconsin	2–9	Hansel (4–1)	Perez (0–3)	None	198	5–17	2–3
23	March 26		at Milwaukee	Franklin Field • Franklin, Wisconsin	Game cancelled						
24	March 28		at Toledo	Scott Park Baseball Complex • Toledo, Ohio	2–7	Shunck (1–1)	English (1–3)	None	105	5–18	2–3
25	March 31		Purdue Fort Wayne	Eastwood Field • Niles, Ohio	9–12	Deany (3–2)	Perry (3–2)	Miller (2)	103	5–19	2–4

April (6–13)

#	Date	Rank	Opponent	Site/stadium	Score	Win	Loss	Save	Attendance	Overall record	Horizon record
26	April 1		Purdue Fort Wayne	Eastwood Field • Niles, Ohio	15–14	Misik (1–2)	Reid (1–2)	None	102	6–19	3–4
27	April 2		Purdue Fort Wayne	Eastwood Field • Niles, Ohio	3–9	Fine (1–3)	Misik (1–3)	None	124	6–20	3–5
28	April 4		Pittsburgh	Eastwood Field • Niles, Ohio	7–13	Candelario (2–0)	Stayduhar (0–1)	None	300	6–21	3–5
29	April 6		Northern Kentucky	Eastwood Field • Niles, Ohio	5–13	Brock (4–2)	Perry (3–3)	Lopez (1)	130	6–22	3–6
30	April 7		Northern Kentucky	Eastwood Field • Niles, Ohio	0–11	Gerl (3–3)	Cam Marshalwitz (0–1)	None	258	6–23	3–7
31	April 8		Northern Kentucky	Eastwood Field • Niles, Ohio	5–11	Echeman (3–1)	English (1–4)	None	211	6–24	3–8
32	April 10		at Pittsburgh	Charles L. Cost Field • Pittsburgh, Pennsylvania	9–4	Gumto (1–1)	Baustista (0–2)	None	272	7–24	3–8
33	April 11		Toledo	Eastwood Field • Niles, Ohio	9–18	Music (3–2)	Perez (0–4)	None	202	7–25	3–8
34	April 14		at Wright State	Nischwitz Stadium • Fairborn, Ohio	6–11	Gongora (5–1)	Gebhardt (0–2)	None	432	7–26	3–9
35	April 15		at Wright State	Nischwitz Stadium • Fairborn, Ohio	3–4	Theis (2–3)	Misik (1–4)	None	212	7–27	3–10
36	April 16		at Wright State	Nischwitz Stadium • Fairborn, Ohio	6–10	Haught (3–1)	English (1–5)	None	242	7–28	3–11
37	April 18		at Penn State	Medlar Field • University Park, Pennsylvania	8–10	Steele (1–0)	Shaffer (0–3)	None	1,034	7–29	3–11
–	April 19		Kent State	Eastwood Field • Niles, Ohio	Game cancelled						
38	April 20		at Oakland	Oakland Baseball Field • Rochester, Michigan	3–5	Stelling (2–4)	Gebhardt (0–3)	None	122	7–30	3–12
39	April 20		at Oakland	Oakland Baseball Field • Rochester, Michigan	4–9	Fekete (2–2)	Cam Marshalwitz (0–2)	Decker (3)	12	7–31	3–13
40	April 21		at Oakland	Oakland Baseball Field • Rochester, Michigan	9–14	Densmore (4–4)	Perry (3–4)	Decker (4)	128	7–32	3–14
41	April 25		Akron	Eastwood Field • Niles, Ohio	8–5	Cam Marshalwitz (1–2)	Beall (0–2)	Cas. Marshalwitz (2)	215	8–32	3–14
42	April 29		Milwaukee	Eastwood Field • Niles, Ohio	8–6	Gumto (2–1)	Frey (4–5)	Cas. Marshalwitz (3)	280	9–32	4–14
43	April 29		Milwaukee	Eastwood Field • Niles, Ohio	11–2	Perry (4–4)	Hansel (5–2)	None	280	10–32	5–14
44	April 30		Milwaukee	Eastwood Field • Niles, Ohio	12–11	Misik (2–4)	Neu (1–4)	Cas. Marshalwitz (4)	365	11–32	6–14

May (7–3)

#	Date	Rank	Opponent	Site/stadium	Score	Win	Loss	Save	Attendance	Overall record	Horizon record
45	May 5		at Purdue Fort Wayne	Mastodon Field • Fort Wayne, Indiana	9–4	Perry (5–4)	Ayres (2–3)	None	102	12–32	7–14
46	May 6		at Purdue Fort Wayne	Mastodon Field • Fort Wayne, Indiana	12–3	Gebhardt (1–3)	Fine (1–5)	Perez (1)	128	13–32	8–14
47	May 7		at Purdue Fort Wayne	Mastodon Field • Fort Wayne, Indiana	14–10	Cam Marshalwitz (2–2)	Myer (0–5)	None	142	14–32	9–14
48	May 9		Bowling Green	Eastwood Field • Niles, Ohio	5–1	Misik (3–4)	Newman (1–2)	None	208	15–32	9–14
49	May 12		at Northern Kentucky	Bill Aker Baseball Complex • Highland Heights, Kentucky	7–10	Brock (5–3)	Perry (5–5)	Devenport (3)	143	15–33	9–15
50	May 13		at Northern Kentucky	Bill Aker Baseball Complex • Highland Heights, Kentucky	12–4	Gebhardt (2–3)	Gerl (4–4)	None	214	16–33	10–15
51	May 14		at Northern Kentucky	Bill Aker Baseball Complex • Highland Heights, Kentucky	17–13	Perez (1–4)	Echeman (5–2)	None	312	17–33	11–15
52	May 16		at Akron	Canal Park • Akron, Ohio	4–13	Roth (2–7)	Misik (3–5)	None	500	17–34	11–15
53	May 18		Wright State	Eastwood Field • Niles, Ohio	1–8	Gongora (9–1)	Perry (5–6)	None	324	17–35	11–16
54	May 19		Wright State	Eastwood Field • Niles, Ohio	8–7	Gebhardt (3–3)	Shirk (5–5)	Cas. Marshalwitz (5)	4,157	18–35	12–16
55	May 20		Wright State	Eastwood Field • Niles, Ohio	9–8	Cam Marshalwitz (3–2)	Stofel (4–5)	Cas. Marshalwitz (6)	337	19–35	13–16

== Awards ==
=== Horizon League Players of the Week ===
Weekly Awards
Player	Award	Date Awarded	Ref.
Trey Law	Co-Batter of the Week	February 28, 2023	
Travis Perry	Co-Pitcher of the Week	February 28, 2023	
Braeden O’Shaughnessy	Batter of the Week	May 9, 2023	
