= 2024 Horizon League baseball tournament =

- Teams: 6
- Format: Double-elimination
- Finals site: Nischwitz Stadium; Fairborn, Ohio
- Champions: Northern Kentucky (1st title)
- Winning coach: Dizzy Peyton (1st title)
- MVP: Treyvin Moss (Northern Kentucky)

2024 Horizon League baseball standings
	Conf.				Overall
Team	W		L	PCT	W		L	PCT
Wright State ‍†‍‍	20	–	10	.667	32	–	24	.571
Northern Kentucky ‍‍‡‍^{y}	19	–	11	.633	35	–	22	.614
Oakland ‍‍‍	18	–	12	.600	31	–	27	.534
Milwaukee ‍‍‍	13	–	17	.433	19	–	36	.345
Purdue Fort Wayne ‍‍‍	11	–	19	.367	19	–	37	.339
Youngstown State ‍‍‍	9	–	21	.300	16	–	44	.267
† – Conference champion ‡ – Tournament champion y – Invited to the NCAA Tournament; As of May 25, 2024; Rankings from D1Baseball

The 2024 Horizon League baseball tournament was held from May 22 through 25. All six of the league's teams met in the double-elimination tournament held at Nischwitz Stadium in Fairborn, Ohio, home field of Wright State, which was the regular season champion. Northern Kentucky won the tournament for the first time and earned the conference's automatic bid to the 2024 NCAA Division I baseball tournament.

== Seeding and format ==
The league's teams were seeded one through six based on winning percentage, using conference games only. The bottom four seeds participated in a play-in round, with winners advancing to a double-elimination tournament also including the top two seeds.

Team	W	L	Pct	GB	Seed
Wright State	20	10	.667	—	1
Northern Kentucky	19	11	.633	1	2
Oakland	18	12	.600	2	3
Milwaukee	13	17	.433	7	4
Purdue Fort Wayne	11	19	.367	9	5
Youngstown State	9	21	.300	11	6

== Bracket ==
Upper round 1	Upper round 2	Upper final	Final
1	Wright State	12
3	Oakland	10	6	Youngstown State	2
6	Youngstown State	13	1	Wright State	6
2	Northern Kentucky	10
2	Northern Kentucky	5
4	Milwaukee	5	4	Milwaukee	3
5	Purdue Fort Wayne	4
2	Northern Kentucky	23
6	Youngstown State	5
Lower round 1	Lower round 2	Lower round 3	Lower final
1	Wright State	3
4	Milwaukee	2	6	Youngstown State	6
6	Youngstown State	12	6	Youngstown State	3
3	Oakland	8	5	Purdue Fort Wayne	10
5	Purdue Fort Wayne	14

== All-Tournament Team ==
The following players were named to the All-Tournament Team.

Pos	Player	School
P	Clay Brock	Northern Kentucky
P	Tanner Gillis	Northern Kentucky
P	Nick Perez	Youngstown State
C	Ian Francis	Youngstown State
1B	RJ Sherwood	Youngstown State
2B	Gus Gregory	Wright State
3B	Zach Lane	Milwaukee
SS	Trey Law	Youngstown State
OF	Logen Devenport	Northern Kentucky
OF	Treyvin Moss	Northern Kentucky
OF	Tyler Shaneyfelt	Northern Kentucky
DH	Julian Greenwell	Wright State

=== Most Valuable Player ===
Treyvin Moss was named Most Valuable Player. Moss was an outfielder for Northern Kentucky.
