= Wabash Valley College =

Community college in Mount Carmel, Illinois, U.S.

Coordinates: 38°25′40.4″N 87°46′44.6″W

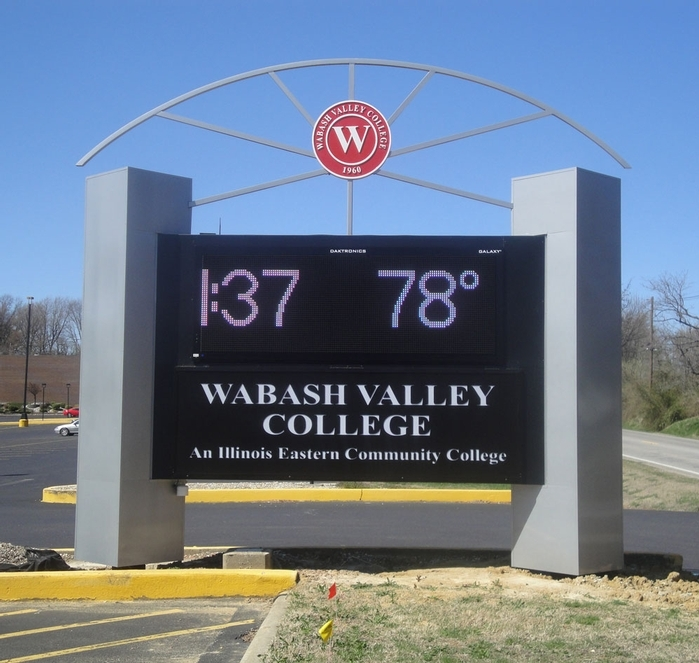
- Main Campus Sign
- Type: Public community college
- Established: 1960
- President: Dr. Matt Fowler
- Undergraduates: 926 (Fall 2022)
- Location: Mount Carmel, Illinois, United States
- Colors: Black and Red
- Nickname: Warriors
- Sporting affiliations: NJCAA Division I Great Rivers Athletic Conference
- Website: www.iecc.edu/wvc
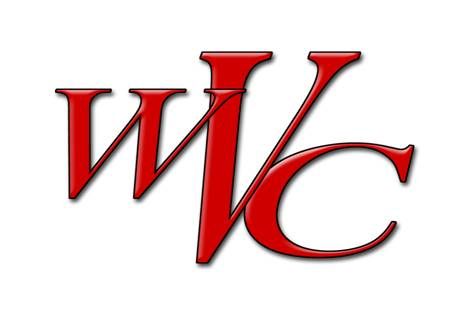

Wabash Valley College (WVC) is a public community college in Mount Carmel, Illinois. It is part of the Illinois Eastern Community College (IECC) district.

== History ==
Wabash Valley College was founded independently in 1960 by the local community school district. In 1969, it joined with Olney Central College to create a two college district, a relationship that was expanded in May of that year with the addition of Lincoln Trail College. In October 1969, a $5.9 million bond issue was approved to finance the construction of permanent campuses for each of the three colleges. In 1978, IECC became a four college district with the addition of Frontier Community College.

== Media ==
Students in the Radio/TV & Digital Media Program operate a college radio station at 89.1 MHz, WVJC The Bash that reaches as far east as Perry County, Indiana and as far west as Clinton County, Illinois and plays alternative music. The station is also streamed online. In addition to alternative rock, the station is also home to Wabash Valley College Warrior sports play by play coverage. WVJC has RDS.

The program also operates a local cable TV channel - News Channel 15 which can be seen on the Sparklight cable TV system in 8 counties in southeastern Illinois including Edwards, Hamilton, Jasper, Lawrence, Richland, Wabash, Wayne, and White counties. Programming on News Channel 15 includes local high school and college sporting events, local events, and a local newscast which airs weeknights at 5:30, 6:00, 6:30, 10, and 10:30 p.m. The station also covers breaking news and severe weather. The channel is also available through the Cablecast Screenweave channel on Roku and Apple TV smart devices.

== Athletics ==
Wabash Valley College's athletic teams compete in the top division of the National Junior College Athletic Association in the Great Rivers Athletic Conference.

=== Baseball ===
The Warriors are perennially a national powerhouse, grabbing a reputation as one of the best junior college programs in the country. At "The Bash", the players are greatly encouraged to give back to their community in more ways than winning baseball games. The baseball program has had players "adopt-a-highway", "walk for diabetes", read to elementary classrooms, rake leaves for the elderly and all-around help with the Wabash Valley College and its campus whenever labor is needed. Other community services the Wabash Valley College Baseball program has offered and continues to offer its support by volunteer help given to the local Wabash Valley YMCA. The baseball players referee children's flag football games, soccer games, and basketball games. The idea behind this type of volunteer work is that the local YMCA will not need to spend a large amount of its funds on referee fees and can use that money for other more important or improvement projects that can help the YMCA be more effective and better equipped to give children the opportunities to be more active and build character. In 2022 the Warriors finished 4th at the JUCO World Series in Grand Junction, Co. The Warriors returned the following year in 2023 and finished 2nd in the JUCO World Series.

=== Men's basketball ===
The men's basketball team at Wabash Valley College has known a number of success throughout the years. The team throughout its history has had a number of prolific coaches, including: Mark Coomes, Jay Harrington, Jay Spoonhour (under whom the men won a national championship) and Dan Sparks, who was inducted into the National Junior College Athletic Association basketball hall of fame. They have won 12 Great Rivers Athletic Conference championships and 14 Region XXIV championships, and an NCJAA National Championship.
