= 2023 Horizon League baseball tournament =

- Teams: 6
- Format: Double-elimination
- Finals site: Nischwitz Stadium; Fairborn, Ohio
- Champions: Wright State (10th title)
- Winning coach: Alex Sogard (3rd title)
- MVP: Andrew Patrick (Wright State)

2023 Horizon League baseball standings
	Conf.				Overall
Team	W		L	PCT	W		L	PCT
Wright State ‍†‍‡‍^{y}	22	–	8	.733	39	–	21	.650
Oakland ‍‍‍	18	–	12	.600	29	–	31	.483
Northern Kentucky ‍‍‍	17	–	13	.567	30	–	27	.526
Youngstown State ‍‍‍	13	–	16	.448	19	–	36	.345
Milwaukee ‍‍‍	11	–	18	.379	25	–	32	.439
Purdue Fort Wayne ‍‍‍	8	–	22	.267	13	–	43	.232
† – Conference champion ‡ – Tournament champion y – Invited to the NCAA Tournament; As of May 27, 2023; Rankings from D1Baseball

The 2023 Horizon League baseball tournament was held from May 24 through 27. All six of the league's teams met in the double-elimination tournament held at Nischwitz Stadium in Fairborn, Ohio, home field of Wright State, which was the regular season champion. Wright State won the tournament for the tenth time and earned the conference's automatic bid to the 2023 NCAA Division I baseball tournament.

== Seeding and format ==
The league's teams were seeded one through six based on winning percentage, using conference games only. The bottom four seeds participated in a play-in round, with winners advancing to a double-elimination tournament also including the top two seeds.

Team	W	L	Pct	GB	Seed
Wright State	22	8	.733	—	1
Oakland	18	12	.600	4	2
Northern Kentucky	17	13	.567	5	3
Youngstown State	13	16	.448	8.5	4
Milwaukee	11	18	.379	10.5	5
Purdue Fort Wayne	8	22	.267	12	6

== Bracket ==
=== Play-In Round ===
Team	R
#5 Milwaukee	12
#4 Youngstown State	3

Team	R
#6 Purdue Fort Wayne	3
#3 Northern Kentucky	6

=== Double-Elimination Rounds ===
First round
1	Wright State	6
5	Milwaukee	3
3	Northern Kentucky	8
2	Oakland	13
Lower round 1
5	Milwaukee	10^{10}
3	Northern Kentucky	8

Semi-finals
1	Wright State	5
2	Oakland	6^{10}
Lower final
1	Wright State	2
5	Milwaukee	1

Finals
2	Oakland	8	0
1	Wright State	9	14

== All-Tournament Team ==
The following players were named to the All-Tournament Team.

Player	School
Ian Cleary	Oakland
Marcus Cline	Milwaukee
Mark Connelly	Milwaukee
Julian Greenwell	Wright State
Tristan Haught	Wright State
Brandon Heidal	Oakland
Colton Kucera	Northern Kentucky
Jay Luikart	Wright State
Brandon Nigh	Oakland
Andrew Patrick	Wright State
Adam Schneider	Northern Kentucky
Luke Stofel	Wright State

=== Most Valuable Player ===
Andrew Patrick was named Most Valuable Player. Moss was an outfielder for Wright State.
