= IECC =

IECC may refer to:

- Illinois Eastern Community Colleges
- Integrated Electronic Control Centre, British railway signalling control system
- International Energy Conservation Code
- International E-mail Chess Club
