= Thomas More Stadium =

American sports venue

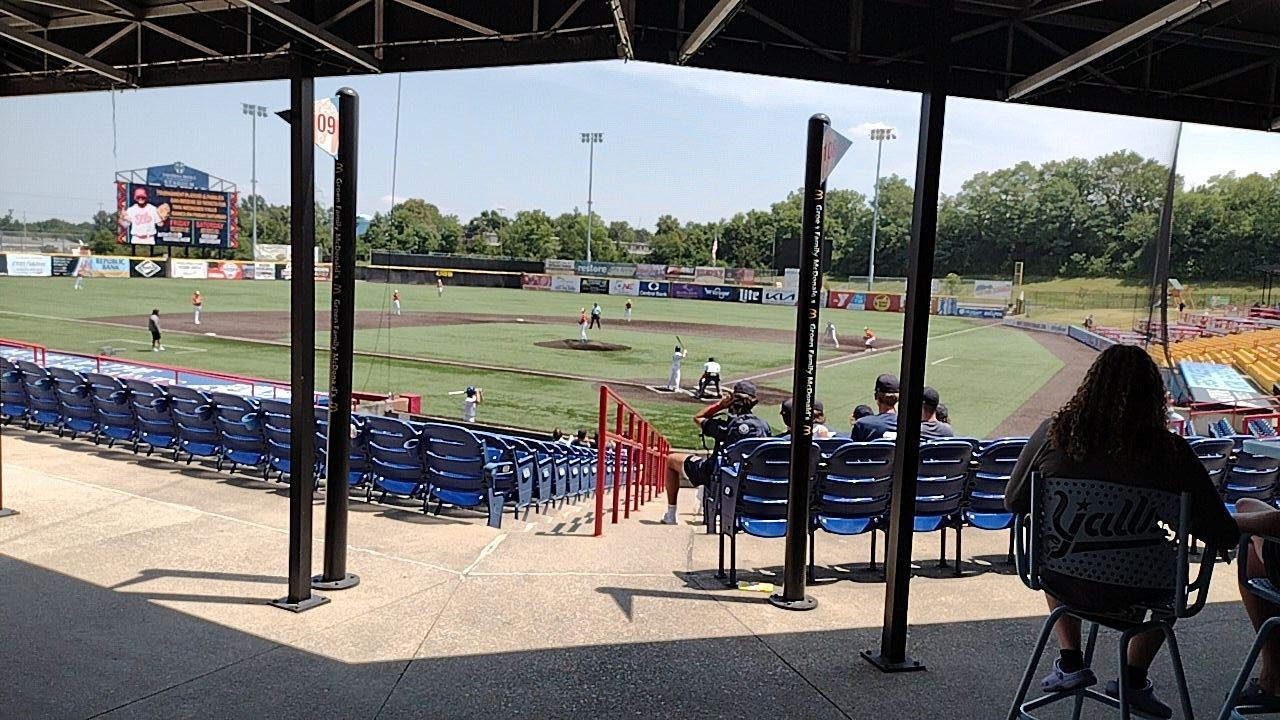
- Thomas More Stadium in 2023

- Location within Kentucky Location within the United States
- Interactive map of Thomas More Stadium
- Former names: Champion Window Field (2004–2012); UC Health Stadium (2013–2020); Y'alls Ballpark (2021)
- Address: 7950 Freedom Way; Florence, KY 41042
- Coordinates: 38.982156°N 84.638479°W
- Capacity: 4,500
- Surface: artificial turf

Construction
- Opened: 2004

Tenants
- Florence Y'alls (NAPB), 2004–present Mount St. Joseph Lions (NCAA), 2020–2024; Thomas More Saints (NCAA), 2023–present Northern Kentucky Norse (NCAA), 2006–2008

Thomas More Stadium is a stadium in Florence, Kentucky. It is primarily used for baseball and is the home field of the Florence Y'alls of the National Association of Professional Baseball, an independent baseball league. It originally opened in 2004 as Champion Window Field and holds 4,500 people.

On November 27, 2012, the then-named Florence Freedom announced that UC Health, the healthcare system of the University of Cincinnati, had signed a 10-year naming rights deal, giving the ballpark its UC Health Stadium name. In May 2021, it was reported that the team was looking for a new naming rights partner after UC Health dropped its sponsorship, and that the team would be using the name Y'alls Ballpark for their home field. In March 2022, the Y'alls announced that Thomas More University had acquired the naming rights, and that the university's baseball team would play at Thomas More Stadium starting in 2023.

== History ==
=== 2004 ownership scandal ===
In July 2004, shortly after the opening of Champion Window Field, contractors began filing liens against the Florence Freedom, accusing the team of not paying for work done on the stadium. Eventually, 33 liens totaling $4.7 million were filed. In August, Fifth Third Bank sued team part-owner Chuck Hildebrant for failing to repay multiple loans taken out to finance the stadium construction. As part of the lawsuit, it was revealed that Hildebrant had used 204 acres (0.83 km^{2}) of land that he did not own as collateral for the loans, and that he had given the bank a forged document as proof of ownership. Hildebrant was later the subject of a federal white collar crime investigation and sentenced to prison in October 2005. The team was sold in November 2004 to a new ownership group led by Clint Brown, who was not associated with Hildebrant's ownership group.

=== Other uses ===
From 2006 to 2008, the Northern Kentucky Norse baseball team, then of NCAA Division II, moved from on-campus Bill Aker Baseball Complex to play its home schedule at Champion Window Field. Thomas More Stadium is currently home to the Mount St. Joseph University Lions.

Events and tenants
Preceded by Bosse Field	Host of the FL All-Star Game; Champion Window Field; 2007	Succeeded by Wuerfel Park
