= Tsamma melon =

Tsamma melon, or simply tsamma, may refer to:

- Citron melon
- Namib tsamma
- Watermelon
  - Tsamma juice, a brand of fresh watermelon juice
