= WVJC =

FM alternative rock station in Illinois, U.S.

- Mount Carmel, Illinois; United States
- Broadcast area: Evansville, Indiana
- Frequency: 89.1 MHz
- Branding: 89.1 the Bash

Programming
- Format: Alternative

Ownership
- Owner: Illinois Eastern Community Colleges

Technical information
- Licensing authority: FCC
- Facility ID: 28305
- Class: B
- ERP: 50,000 watts
- HAAT: 101.0 meters
- Transmitter coordinates: 38°26′29.00″N 87°45′26.00″W

Links
- Public license information: Public file; LMS
- Webcast: Listen Live
- Website: www.bashradio.com

WVJC (89.1 FM) "89.1 The Bash" is a radio station broadcasting an alternative format. Licensed to Mount Carmel, Illinois, United States, the station serves the Evansville, Indiana tri-state region. The station is currently owned by Illinois Eastern Community Colleges. Students in the Radio/TV and Digital Media program at Wabash Valley College staff the station.
