= Dizzy Peyton =

American college baseball coach

Current position
- Title: Head coach
- Team: Northern Kentucky
- Conference: Horizon League
- Record: 115–111 (.509)

Biographical details
- Education: Northern Kentucky University

Playing career
- 2003: Northern Kentucky
- Position: Pitcher

Coaching career (HC unless noted)
- 2005–2021: Northern Kentucky (Assistant)
- 2022–present: Northern Kentucky

Head coaching record
- Overall: 115–111 (.509)
- Tournaments: 5–4 (Horizon); 0–2 (NCAA)

Accomplishments and honors

Championships
- Horizon tournament (2024)

Awards
- Horizon League Coach of the Year (2024)

Dizzy Peyton is an American college baseball coach, head coach of the NCAA Division I Horizon League's Northern Kentucky Norse. He was an assistant coach at Northern Kentucky from 2005 to 2021. Prior to coaching, Peyton played 1 season of college baseball at Northern Kentucky in 2003.

== Coaching career ==
On June 8, 2021, Northern Kentucky announced that long-time assistant coach Dizzy Peyton had been named head coach of the Northern Kentucky Norse baseball team upon the retirement of Todd Asalon.

== Head coaching record ==
Record table
Season	Team	Overall	Conference	Standing	Postseason
Northern Kentucky Norse (Horizon League) (2022–present)
2022	Northern Kentucky	19–35	11–17	6th	Horizon League Tournament
2023	Northern Kentucky	30–27	17–13	3rd	Horizon League Tournament
2024	Northern Kentucky	35–24	19–11	2nd	NCAA Regional
2025	Northern Kentucky	31–25	18–12	2nd	Horizon League Tournament
Northern Kentucky:		115–111 (.509)	65–53 (.551)		
Total:		115–111 (.509)			
National champion Postseason invitational champion Conference regular season champion Conference regular season and conference tournament champion Division regular season champion Division regular season and conference tournament champion Conference tournament champion
