= Colin Kaline =

American baseball player and coach

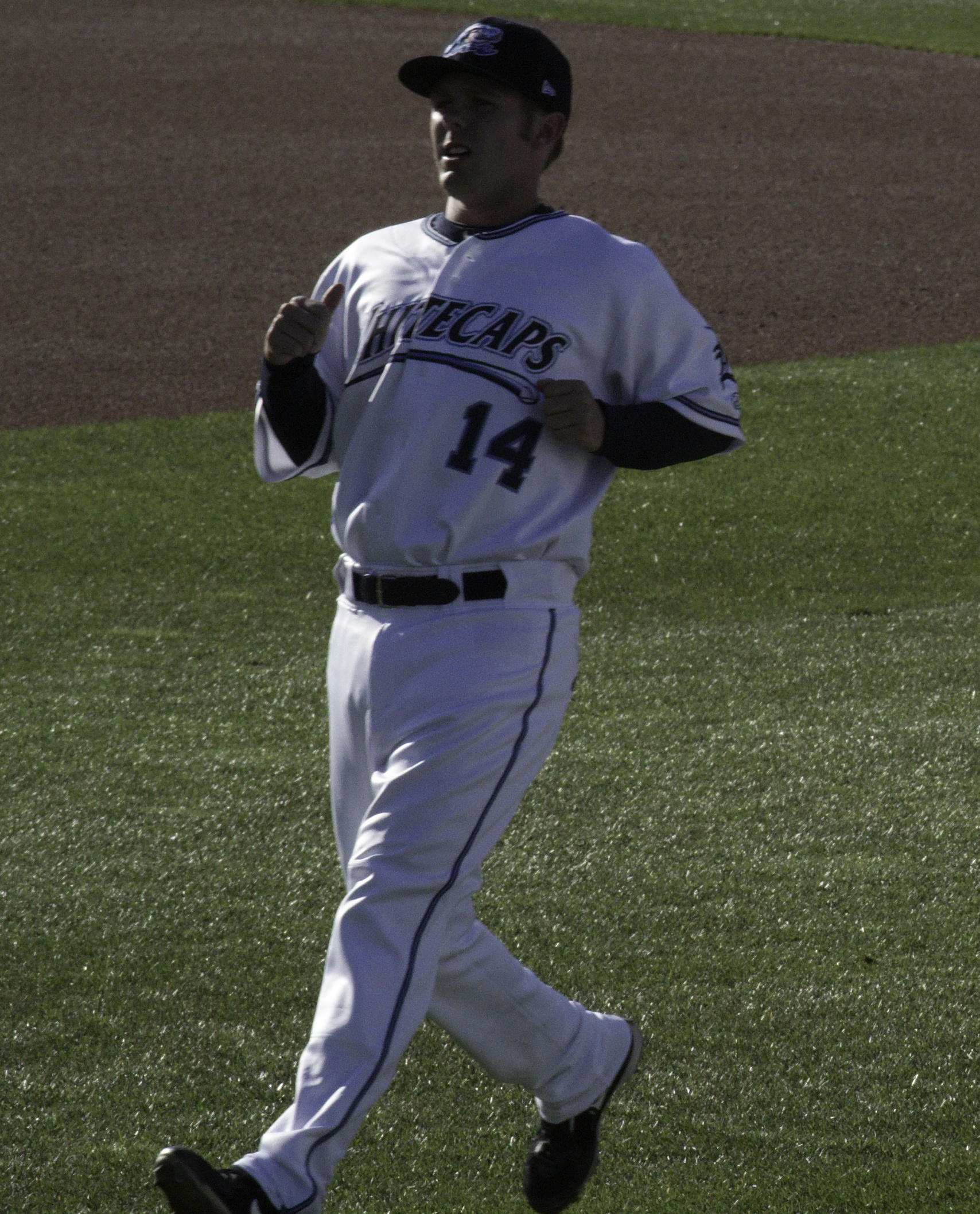
- Kaline playing for the West Michigan Whitecaps in 2012

Biographical details
- Born: April 26, 1989 (age 36); Detroit, Michigan

Playing career
- 2008–2011: Florida Southern
- 2011: Connecticut Tigers
- 2012: West Michigan Whitecaps
- Position(s): Second baseman, Third baseman

Coaching career (HC unless noted)
- 2013: Gulf Coast League Tigers (asst.)
- 2014–2016: Florida Southern (asst.)
- 2017–2019: Oakland (Co-HC)
- 2020: Oakland

Head coaching record
- Overall: 45–119
- Tournaments: Horizon: 2–4; NCAA: 0–0

Colin Michael Kaline (born April 26, 1989) is an American baseball coach and former second baseman and third baseman. He played college baseball at Florida Southern for coaches Pete Meyer and Jim Tyrrell from 2008 to 2011 before playing in Minor League Baseball (MiLB) for 2 seasons from 2011 to 2012. He then served as the head coach of Oakland Golden Grizzlies (2017–2020).

== Playing career ==
Kaline attended Birmingham Groves High School in Beverly Hills, Michigan. Kaline played for the school's varsity baseball team all four years. The Detroit Tigers selected Kaline in the 25th round of the 2007 Major League Baseball draft. He did not sign, and enrolled at the Florida Southern College, to play college baseball for the Florida Southern Moccasins baseball team.

As a freshman at Florida Southern in 2008, Kaline had a .250 batting average, hit 3 doubles and a .313 SLG.

As a sophomore in 2009, Kaline batted .227 with a .349 SLG, 1 home run, and 24 RBIs.

In the 2010 season as a junior, Kaline scored 45 runs and hit 5 doubles.

Kaline as a senior in 2011, he record 41 hits, 1 home run and had 17 RBIs.

Kaline was then drafted in the 26th round of the 2011 Major League Baseball draft by the Detroit Tigers. Kaline would play two seasons for the Connecticut Tigers and the West Michigan Whitecaps before retiring from playing.

== Coaching career ==
Kaline returned to his alma mater in 2014 where he coached for three seasons as an assistant. With John Musachio being fired, Kaline and Jacke Healey were named co-head coaches of the Oakland Golden Grizzlies baseball program on July 12, 2016.

Kaline was asked to continue solo in June 2019 until he resigned for health reasons in March 2020.

== Head coaching record ==
Statistics overview
Season	Team	Overall	Conference	Standing	Postseason
Oakland Golden Grizzlies (Horizon League) (2017–2020)
2017	Oakland	17–40	11–19	5th	Horizon League Tournament
2018	Oakland	15–32	12–14	4th	Horizon League Tournament
2019	Oakland	11–37	9–18	5th	Horizon League Tournament
2020	Oakland	2–10	0–0		Season canceled due to COVID-19
Oakland:		45–119	32–51		
Total:		45–119			
National champion Postseason invitational champion Conference regular season champion Conference regular season and conference tournament champion Division regular season champion Division regular season and conference tournament champion Conference tournament champion

== Personal life ==
Kaline is the grandson of baseball Hall of Famer Al Kaline, who played for the Detroit Tigers. Kaline's father, Michael, played college baseball at Miami University.

Kaline married Stephanie Eller on October 26, 2013. Their first child, a daughter named Kennedy, was born in the fall of 2018.
