= Jacke Healey =

American college baseball coach (born 1988)

Biographical details
- Born: June 26, 1988 (age 37); Trenton, New Jersey

Playing career
- 2007–2008: Potomac State
- 2009–2010: Youngstown State
- 2010–2011: Tri-City ValleyCats
- Position(s): Shortstop

Coaching career (HC unless noted)
- 2012: Factoryville (PA) Lackawanna Trail (asst.)
- 2013: Pittsburgh (vol. asst.)
- 2014–2016: Oakland (asst.)
- 2017–2019: Oakland (Co-HC)

Head coaching record
- Overall: 43–109
- Tournaments: Horizon: 2–4; NCAA: 0–0

Accomplishments and honors

Awards
- 2× First Team All-Horizon League (2009, 2010)

Jacke Healey (born June 26, 1988) is an American college baseball coach and former shortstop. Healey was the Co-head baseball coach at the Oakland University from 2017 to 2019 with Colin Kaline.

== Playing career ==
Healey attended Lackawanna Trail High School in Factoryville, Pennsylvania. Healey played for the school's varsity baseball team all four years. Healey then enrolled at the Potomac State College of West Virginia University, to play college baseball for the Potomac State Catamounts baseball team.

As a freshman at Potomac State in 2007, Healey and the Catamounts were defeated by Spartanburg Methodist College to go to the JUCO World Series. Healey had a .294 batting average, hit 4 doubles and a .529 SLG.

As a sophomore in 2008, Healey batted .456 with a .823 SLG, 11 home runs, and 48 RBIs. Healey was named one of 9 winners of the Rawlings Big Stick award. He was also named a Second Team All-National Junior College Athletic Association All-American.

In the 2009 season as a junior, Healey hit 8 home runs and 17 doubles. He was named First Team All-Horizon League as well as the Horizon League All-Newcomer team.

Healey had his best season as a senior in 2010, leading the team in hits (83), home runs (12) and RBIs (59). He was named First Team All-Horizon League.

Healey was then drafted in the 26th round of the 2010 Major League Baseball draft by the Houston Astros. Healey would play two seasons for the Tri-City ValleyCats before retiring from playing.

== Coaching career ==
Healey returned to Lackawanna Trail as an assistant coach in 2012, and was hired by the Pittsburgh Panthers baseball program as a volunteer assistant on September 14, 2012. The Panthers set a school record with 42 wins with Healey on staff. On September 10, 2013, Healey joined the Oakland Golden Grizzlies baseball program as a full-time assistant. With John Musachio being fired, Healey and Colin Kaline were named co-head coaches of the Oakland program on July 12, 2016. Healey was relieved of his duties as co-head coach in June, 2019. Kaline continued as the team's head coach.

== Head coaching record ==
Statistics overview
Season	Team	Overall	Conference	Standing	Postseason
Oakland Golden Grizzlies (Horizon League) (2017–2019)
2017	Oakland	17–40	11–19	5th	Horizon League Tournament
2018	Oakland	15–32	12–14	4th	Horizon League Tournament
2019	Oakland	11–37	9–18	5th	Horizon League Tournament
Oakland:		43–109	32–51		
Total:		43–109			
National champion Postseason invitational champion Conference regular season champion Conference regular season and conference tournament champion Division regular season champion Division regular season and conference tournament champion Conference tournament champion
