= Sarah Frey =

American farmer and entrepreneur

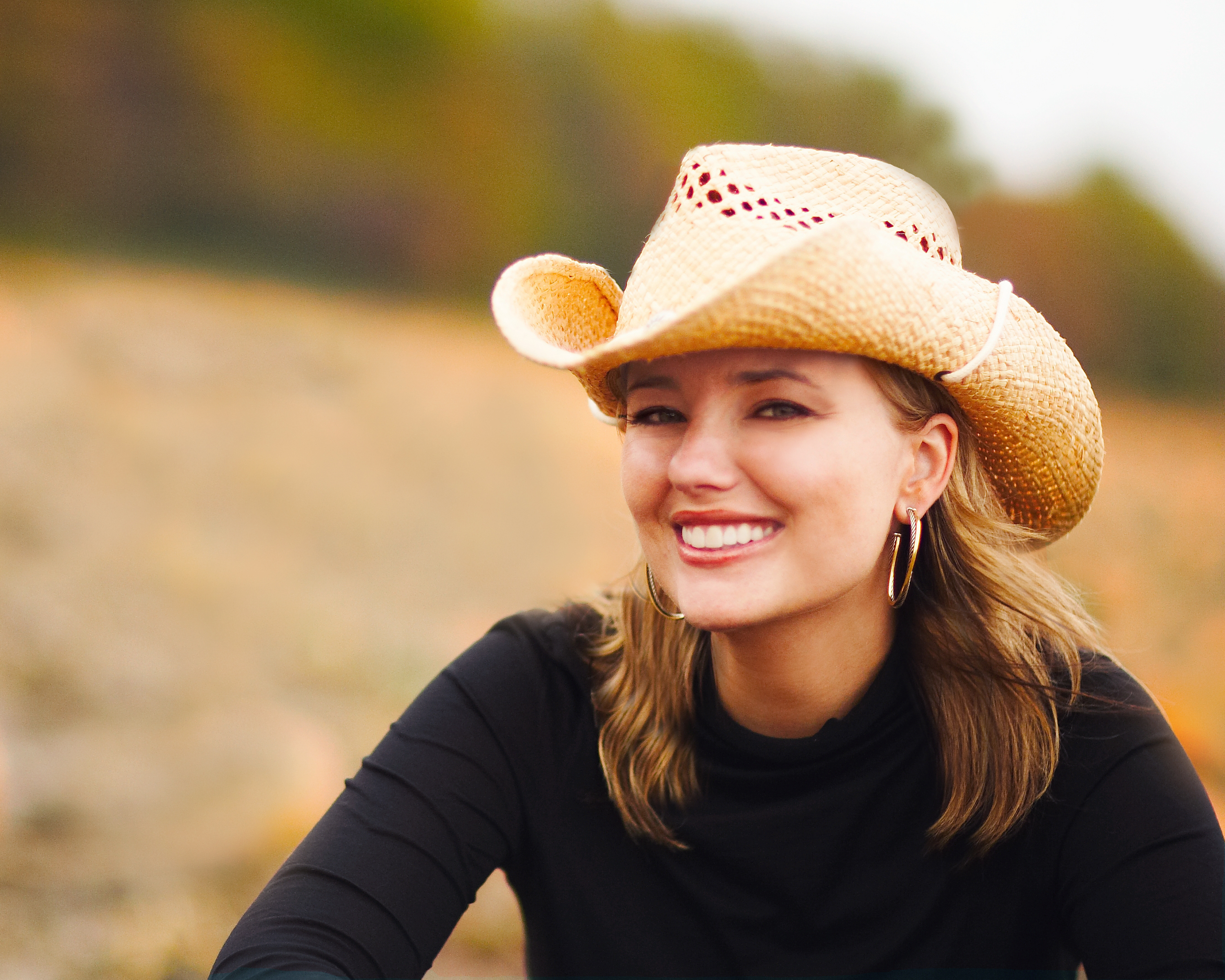
- Sarah Frey in 2006
- Born: July 24, 1976 (age 50); United States
- Occupations: Farmer, entrepreneur
- Title: CEO of Frey Farms
- Term: 1992–present

Sarah Frey (born July 24, 1976) is an American farmer and entrepreneur. She is the CEO and owner of Frey Farms, which she founded at age sixteen.

== Early life and education ==
Frey was born July 24, 1976, to Harold and Elizabeth Frey. Both had been previously married. Her father was a steelworker and a farmer and for a time part owner of the Dixie Feed franchise in St. Louis, but her parents fled to Tennessee to escape what Frey calls "a perfect storm" of bad decision-making by her father, who staged an accident to make it look as if he'd died. The couple's first child, a girl, was killed as a toddler in a farm accident; the couple left Tennessee for Illinois shortly thereafter. Frey has four older full brothers, thirteen half-siblings from her father's first marriage, and two from her mother's first marriage; counting her half siblings she is the youngest of 21.

The family's original 80-acre farm, which they called the Hill, is five miles from Orchardville and thirty miles from Mount Vernon in southern Illinois. The family's home did not have indoor plumbing until Frey was five years old. It was heated by a woodstove. The family survived mostly on food raised on the farm or hunted and fished for, sometimes resorting to poaching. Frey wrote in her memoir, The Growing Season, that "I never remember going to bed without eating anything, but sometimes our meals were just a bowl of mush."

In her memoir she describes learning to drive by the age of five, writing, "There were vehicles everywhere with the keys in the ignition. Starting when I was four or five, whenever my parents took the truck into town and left me alone at the farm, I'd hop into their old two-door Mercury Grand Marquis. I would hot-lap around the farm, driving in circles".

In her memoir Frey wrote that at age seven she was sexually abused by a farmhand, and when she told her father, he told her mother to keep a closer eye on Frey. She wrote that only after she'd discovered a peephole the farmhand had drilled between her bedroom and his and showed it to her mother did her parents send him away.

Her mother had a "melon route", purchasing melons from neighboring farms and delivering them to local grocery stores, which Frey helped with from the time she was 8.

At 15, she moved out of her parents' house.

Frey attended Frontier Community College while also attending high school.

== Career ==
At 16, she borrowed $10,000 to buy a used truck and took over distribution of the melon route, quickly increasing the farm's client list from 12 to 150.

Her parents' financial situation had become dire. Her parents, who had falsely presented themselves as married for thirty years, were separating. The farm was being foreclosed on. In her youth, Frey had wanted to follow her brothers off the farm and move to a city, but following the threat of the farm's repossession, she decided to help save it. She purchased the farm outright at age 18. At the time it was in two parcels, the original 80 acres and another parcel of 20. She decided to use the land to grow pumpkins, a fall crop that would be ready for harvest after the melon season ended and thereby extend her earnings period. She worked at the local Walmart distribution center business in 1997, while still in high school.

The pumpkin business model was successful and Frey has been described as "the Pumpkin Queen of America". She grows more pumpkins than any other farmer in the United States. In 2016, Frey sold around five million pumpkins. Most of her pumpkin crop is not suitable for eating, but is very popular for Halloween lantern carving. The family business now owns about 15,000 acres (6,100 ha) of farms, spanning Florida, Georgia, Missouri, Arkansas, Illinois, Indiana, and West Virginia. Although pumpkins are the most popular produce, the business also farms watermelons, cantaloupes, sweet corn, and hard squash. In 2018, Frey Farms launched Sarah's Homegrown. Sarah's Homegrown is focused on agua frescas and fresh produce. Frey Farms is a Certified Women Owned Business.

She created Tsamma Watermelon Juice as a way to use the "ugly fruit" that would otherwise be discarded or tilled back into the fields. Frey's business negotiations with Walmart have been featured in a Harvard Business School study.

Sarah Frey serves on the United Fresh Government Relations Council and the National Watermelon Promotion Board. She is also a member of the Illinois Agriculture Coalition committee. Frey is currently on the steering committee for the IBIC.

Her second book, The Growing Season (2020), was reviewed by Publishers Weekly and the Boston Globe, The New York Times, Kirkus Reviews and The Library Journal.

== Politics ==
Politico reported during the 2024 Presidential Transition of the incoming Second Trump Administration, Frey was suggested as a potential candidate for Secretary of Agriculture to President Trump by his daughter Ivanka Trump.

In 2019, Frey was recruited by congressional Republicans looking for a female candidate to replace Republican Representative John Shimkus after he announced his retirement, but she decided not to run.

== Reception ==
The Boston Globe called her "a woman with a potent sense of self and an unmatched ability for inventing and selling herself in a business world often skeptical of or hostile to women, especially those without pedigree or connections."

== Published works ==
- For the Love of Pumpkins: A Visual Guide to Fall Decorating with Pumpkins and Ornamentals (2007) ISBN 978-0979534201
- The Growing Season: How I Built a New Life--and Saved an American Farm (2020) ISBN 9780593129401

== Awards and recognition ==
- PMA "Eight Women Leaders You Should Know"
- 2015 Jan Fleming Award
- Frey Farms won the United States Advocate of the Year Award in 2015
- 2020 Women in Produce Award

== Personal life ==
Frey is divorced with two sons.
