= 2022 Horizon League baseball tournament =

- Teams: 6
- Format: Double-elimination
- Finals site: Nischwitz Stadium; Fairborn, Ohio
- Champions: Wright State (9th title)
- Winning coach: Alex Sogard (3rd title)
- MVP: Zane Harris (Wright State Raiders)

2022 Horizon League baseball standings
	Conf.				Overall
Team	W		L	PCT	W		L	PCT
Wright State ‍†‍‡‍^{y}	20	–	9	.690	30	–	25	.545
Oakland ‍‍‍	18	–	11	.621	31	–	27	.534
UIC ‍‍‍	14	–	11	.560	22	–	25	.468
Purdue Fort Wayne ‍‍‍	13	–	15	.464	18	–	36	.333
Youngstown State ‍‍‍	12	–	16	.429	21	–	36	.368
Northern Kentucky ‍‍‍	11	–	17	.393	19	–	35	.352
Milwaukee ‍‍‍	9	–	17	.346	20	–	29	.408
† – Conference champion ‡ – Tournament champion y – Invited to the NCAA tournament Rankings from D1Baseball

The 2022 Horizon League baseball tournament was held from May 25 through 28. The top six of the league's seven teams met in the double-elimination tournament held at Nischwitz Stadium in Fairborn, Ohio, home field of Wright State. The winner of the tournament earned the conference's automatic bid to the 2022 NCAA Division I baseball tournament.

== Seeding and format ==
The league's teams were seeded one through six based on winning percentage, using conference games only. The bottom four seeds participated in a play-in round, with winners advancing to a double-elimination tournament also including the top two seeds.

Team	W	L	Pct	GB	Seed
Wright State	20	9	.690	—	1
Oakland	18	11	.621	2	2
UIC	14	11	.560	4	3
Purdue Fort Wayne	13	15	.464	6.5	4
Youngstown State	12	16	.429	7.5	5
Northern Kentucky	11	17	.393	8.5	6
Milwaukee	9	17	.346	9.5	—

== Bracket ==
=== Play-In Round ===
Team	R
#6 Northern Kentucky	3
#3 UIC	2

Team	R
#5 Youngstown State	6
#4 Purdue Fort Wayne	0

=== Double-Elimination Rounds ===
First round
1	Wright State	18
6	Northern Kentucky	4
2	Oakland	2
5	Youngstown State	0
Lower round 1
6	Northern Kentucky	7
5	Youngstown State	11

Semi-finals
1	Wright State	14
2	Oakland	3
Lower final
2	Oakland	4
5	Youngstown State	2

Finals
1	Wright State	24
2	Oakland	0

== Schedule ==
Game	Time*	Matchup^{#}	Score
Wednesday, May 25
1	12:00pm	No. 4 Purdue Fort Wayne vs No. 5 Youngstown State	0-6
2	4:00pm	No. 3 UIC vs No. 6 Northern Kentucky	2-3
Thursday, May 26
3	10:00am	No. 1 Wright State vs No. 6 Northern Kentucky	18-4
4	2:00pm	No. 2 Oakland vs No. 5 Youngstown State	2-0
Friday, May 27
5	12:00pm	Loser Game 3 No. 6 Northern Kentucky vs Loser Game 4 No. 5 Youngstown State Elimination Game	7-11
6	4:00pm	Winner Game 3 No. 1 Wright State vs Winner Game 4 No. 2 Oakland	14-3
7	8:00pm	Winner Game 5 No. 5 Youngstown State vs Loser Game 6 No. 2 Oakland Elimination Game	2-4
Saturday, May 28
8	12:00pm	Winner Game 6 No. 1 Wright State vs Winner Game 7 No. 2 Oakland	24-0
9	4:00pm	Winner Game 8 vs Loser Game 8 If Necessary	
*Game times in EDT. # – Rankings denote tournament seed.

== All-Tournament Team ==
The following players were named to the All-Tournament Team.

Player	School
Gehrig Anglin	Wright State
Zane Harris	Wright State
Jay Luikart	Wright State
Andrew Patrick	Wright State
Justin Reimer	Wright State
Sammy Sass	Wright State
Alec Sayre	Wright State
Quinton Kujawa	Oakland
Cam Post	Oakland
Matt Brosky	Youngstown State
Ryan Glass	Northern Kentucky
