= Tsamma juice =

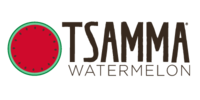

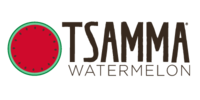
- Tsamma juice logo
- Type: Fruit juice
- Inception: 2014
- Manufacturer: Frey Farms
- Available: Available
- Website: tsammajuice.com

Tsamma juice (/ˈsɑːmə/ SAH-mə) is a brand of watermelon juice, produced by Frey Farms since 2014. The juice is also available ready-mixed with coconut water or blueberry juice.

The brand is named after Tsamma, a local name for a type of watermelon found in sub-Saharan Africa, said to be "the Mother of all watermelon varieties"; however, the juice is farmed from watermelons grown in the Midwest and Southern United States. The production farms cover a total of 7,000 acres (2,800 ha) of watermelons, and also house a major national supplier of pumpkins.

== History ==
The juice was first produced by company founder Sarah Frey, aged 16, following a traditional family recipe. She established a full-time business after graduating from high school, realizing there was no commercial distributor of watermelon juice, and was shipping to 150 stores by the end of the first year of production. Frey has suggested that the juice could be a suitable replacement for coconut water.
