= Todd Asalon =

American baseball coach

Playing career
- 1980–1983: Northern Kentucky
- Position(s): Catcher

Coaching career (HC unless noted)
- 1991–1994: Northern Kentucky (asst.)
- 1995–2000: Thomas More College
- 2001–2021: Northern Kentucky

Head coaching record
- Overall: 564–581–1
- Tournaments: Horizon: 2–6; NCAA: 0–0

Accomplishments and honors

Awards
- 4× GLVC Coach of the Year (2002, 2006, 2009, 2010)

Todd Asalon is an American former baseball coach and catcher. He played college baseball at Northern Kentucky for coach Bill Aker from 1980 to 1983. He served as the head coach of the Thomas More Saints (1995–2000) and the Northern Kentucky Norse (2001–2021).

== Coaching career ==
Asalon became a college coach in 1991 as an assistant for the Northern Kentucky Norse baseball program.

In 1995, Asalon became the head coach of Thomas More College.

After becoming the head coach of the Norse in 2001, Asalon won his first Great Lakes Valley Conference (GLVC) Coach of the Year Award in 2002. Asalon repeated as GLVC Coach of the Year in 2006. Asalon achieved his third GLVC Coach of the Year in 2009. Asalon was awarded his 4th GLVC Coach of the Year in 2010.

In 2013, the Norse moved to NCAA Division I as members of the Atlantic Sun Conference.

Just before the start of the 2021 season, Asalong announced that he would be retiring from coaching at the conclusion of the season.

== Head coaching record ==
Statistics overview
Season	Team	Overall	Conference	Standing	Postseason
Northern Kentucky Norse (Great Lakes Valley Conference) (2001–2012)
2001	Northern Kentucky	38–21	13–14	3rd (North)	
2002	Northern Kentucky	37–24	21–8	1st	NCAA Regional
2003	Northern Kentucky	28–24	15–15	T-5th	
2004	Northern Kentucky	37–25	26–14	2nd	NCAA Regional
2005	Northern Kentucky	31–26	22–14	3rd	
2006	Northern Kentucky	42–20–1	36–11–1	1st	NCAA Regional
2007	Northern Kentucky	27–26	22–16	7th	
2008	Northern Kentucky	37–22	21–10	3rd (East)	NCAA Regional
2009	Northern Kentucky	41–22	20–12	2nd (East)	NCAA Regional
2010	Northern Kentucky	43–17	24–3	1st (East)	NCAA Regional
2011	Northern Kentucky	36–21	21–13	2nd (East)	NCAA Regional
2012	Northern Kentucky	36–22	25–11	2nd (East)	NCAA Regional
Northern Kentucky Norse (Atlantic Sun Conference) (2013–2015)
2013	Northern Kentucky	8–47	3–24	10th	Ineligible
2014	Northern Kentucky	14–37	6–21	10th	Ineligible
2015	Northern Kentucky	17–34	5–16	7th	Ineligible
Northern Kentucky Norse (Horizon League) (2016–2021)
2016	Northern Kentucky	20–34	9–21	6th	Horizon League Tournament
2017	Northern Kentucky	25–33	17–13	3rd	Horizon League Tournament
2018	Northern Kentucky	14–39	9–21	6th	Horizon League Tournament
2019	Northern Kentucky	15–40	12–17	4th	Horizon League Tournament
2020	Northern Kentucky	0–17	0–0		Season canceled due to COVID-19
2021	Northern Kentucky	17–31	14–25	5th	
Northern Kentucky:		564–581–1	341–299		
Total:		564–581–1			
National champion Postseason invitational champion Conference regular season champion Conference regular season and conference tournament champion Division regular season champion Division regular season and conference tournament champion Conference tournament champion
