= Illinois Eastern Community Colleges =

U.S. state community college district

The Illinois Eastern Community Colleges is a community college district headquartered in Olney, IL, with college campuses located in Olney, Fairfield, Robinson, and Mount Carmel.

== Description ==
Illinois Eastern Community Colleges District #529 (IECC) is located in a 3,000-square-mile (7,800 km^{2}) area of southeastern Illinois near the Illinois-Indiana border. The multi-college District includes Frontier Community College at Fairfield, Lincoln Trail College at Robinson, Olney Central College at Olney, and Wabash Valley College at Mt. Carmel.

Bordered on the east by the Wabash River, the District is located in a scenic section of the state, with wooded areas, golf courses, and recreational lakes scattered throughout the region. The District includes all or parts of 12 counties and has a total population of 111,000.

Because the college District is one of 39 tax-supported community college districts in the State of Illinois, the cost is very affordable. In addition, the District has purposely held the line on costs to assure that all students have equal access to higher education. (IECC's tuition rate is one of the lowest in the tri-state area.)

A diversified base of agriculture, healthcare, manufacturing, processing, and distributing provides employment for citizens throughout southeast Illinois in such industries as Automotive Technology Systems, Marathon Petroleum Refining, Champion Laboratories, Hella Electronics, North American Lighting, Wal-Mart Distribution Center, and various healthcare centers.

Each of the colleges is located in a small-town setting, with convenient access to larger cities in Illinois and Indiana. The colleges serve as centers for educational and cultural excellence, attracting not only recent high school graduates but also many adult students who are upgrading their skills, earning the first two years of a four-year degree, or participating in plays, concerts, and seminars.

The college District also includes a highly successful Workforce Education program which provides short-term training for some 10,000 employees each year at plant sites throughout the State of Illinois and in other states and countries as well.

== Colleges ==
- Wabash Valley College, Mount Carmel, Illinois
- Olney Central College, Olney, Illinois
- Lincoln Trail College, Robinson, Illinois
- Frontier Community College, Fairfield, Illinois
