= Olney Central College =

Community college in Olney, Illinois, U.S.

- Type: Public community college
- Established: 1963
- Parent institution: Illinois Eastern Community Colleges
- President: Chris A. Simpson
- Students: 869 (Fall 2022)
- Location: Olney, Illinois, U.S. 38°43′46.7″N 88°4′54.0″W
- Colors: Blue and white
- Nickname: Blue Knights
- Sporting affiliations: NJCAA Division I Great Rivers Athletic Conference
- Mascot: Blue Knight
- Website: www.iecc.edu/occ/

Olney Central College is a public community college in Olney, Illinois. It confers associate degrees and technical certificates and also offers online bachelor's degrees through its affiliation with Franklin University. Olney Central College is a member of the Illinois Eastern Community Colleges district.

== Athletics ==
Olney Central College features its own athletic program, referring to themselves as the Blue Knights and compete in the National Junior College Athletic Association. They compete under NJCAA Region 24, and the Blue Knights are members of the GRAC. The sports offered at Olney Central College are baseball, basketball(both men's and women's), and softball.

== Notable alumni ==
- Clint Barmes, professional baseball player
- Jerad Eickhoff, professional baseball player
