= Frontier Community College =

Community college in Fairfield, Illinois, U.S.

Coordinates: 38.3823°N 88.3921°W

- Type: Public, two-year Community College
- Established: 1976; 50 years ago
- President: Jay Edgren
- Students: 1,740 (Fall 2022)
- Location: Fairfield, Illinois, U.S.
- Campus: Rural
- Colors: Gold and black
- Nickname: Bobcats
- Sporting affiliations: NJCAA Division I
- Website: www.iecc.edu/fcc

Frontier Community College is a community college in Fairfield, Illinois. It confers two-year associate degrees and technical certificates and also offers online four-year degrees through its affiliation with Franklin University. Frontier Community College is one of four colleges in the Illinois Eastern Community Colleges #529 (IECC).

Originally named Illinois Eastern Community Colleges' Continuing Education Facilities in Fairfield, the college opened on September 6, 1974.

== History ==
On July 26, 1976, the concept of "Campus Beyond Walls" was established by the board of trustees for the Continuing Education Division. The concept was established in order to take education to the people of the 12 counties included in the Illinois Eastern Community Colleges. Classes were held in churches, schools, community buildings, etc.

The Foundation was formed by community citizens in 1977 and offer financial support with building needs, programs and scholarships.

Presidents of the college include:

- Richard L. Mason 1976–1996
- William Lex 1996–2000
- Michael Dreith 2001–2007
- Charles Novak 2007–2008 (Interim)
- Tim Taylor 2008–2014
- Jay Edgren 2014–present

== Athletics ==
Frontier has an athletic program. Their team is called the Bobcats, and they compete in the National Junior College Athletic Association in Region XXVI. The school offers three sports which are baseball, softball, and girls' volleyball.

== Notable alumni ==
- Sarah Frey, farmer and entrepreneur
