= Lincoln Trail College =

Community college in Robinson, Illinois, U.S.

Coordinates: 39°1′10.9″N 87°41′17.5″W

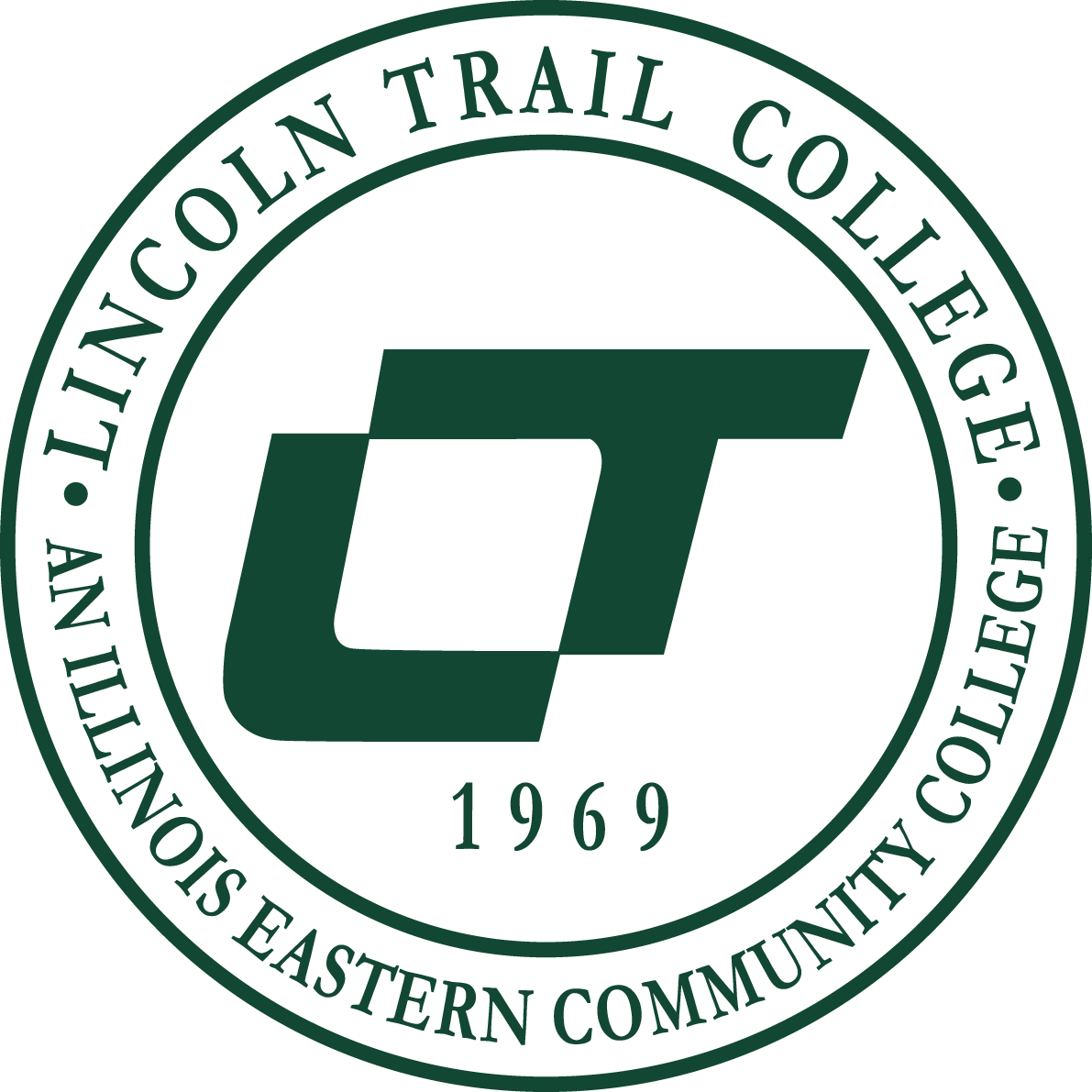
- Type: Community College
- Established: 1969
- Parent institution: Illinois Eastern Community Colleges
- President: Tona Ambrose
- Students: 636 (Fall 2022)
- Location: Robinson, Illinois, U.S.
- Colors: Green, white and orange
- Nickname: Statesmen
- Sporting affiliations: NJCAA; Great Rivers Athletic Conference
- Website: www.iecc.edu/ltc

Lincoln Trail College is a public community college in Robinson, Illinois. The college was founded in 1969 and is a member of the Illinois Eastern Community Colleges organization.

== Academics ==
The college offers career preparation programs and a two-year college transfer curriculum. The college is accredited by the Higher Learning Commission.

== Athletics ==
Intercollegiate team sports at Lincoln Trail College include baseball, basketball (men's and women's), golf, soccer, softball, and volleyball. Teams compete in the Great Rivers Athletic Conference in Region 24 of the National Junior College Athletic Association.
