= Bill Aker Baseball Complex =

Baseball park at Northern Kentucky University

- Location within Kentucky Location within the United States
- Interactive map of Bill Aker Baseball Complex
- Full name: Bill Aker (Brian Burkhart) Baseball Complex at Friendship Field
- Former names: Friendship Field
- Address: Johns Hill Road and Kenton Drive; Highland Heights, Kentucky; USA
- Coordinates: 39.028748°N 84.465385°W
- Owner: Northern Kentucky University
- Operator: Northern Kentucky University
- Capacity: 500
- Surface: Artificial turf
- Scoreboard: Electronic
- Field size: Left field: 330 ft (100 m); Left center: 365 ft (111 m); Center field: 395 ft (120 m); Right center: 365 ft (111 m); Right field: 330 ft (100 m)

Construction
- Renovated: 2013

Tenant
- Northern Kentucky Norse baseball (NCAA Division I Horizon) ?–2005, 2009–present

The Bill Aker Baseball Complex is a baseball venue located on the campus of Northern Kentucky University in Highland Heights, Kentucky, United States. It is the home field of the Northern Kentucky Norse baseball team, a member of the NCAA Division I Horizon League. The complex is named for Bill Aker, who was the head coach of Northern Kentucky baseball from 1971 to 2000. It has a capacity of 500 spectators.

== History ==
Prior to 2001, the venue was known as Friendship Field. In 2001, it was renamed the Bill Aker Baseball Complex at Friendship Field, in honor of former Northern Kentucky head coach Bill Aker. Aker had led the program from its 1971 inception to the end of the 2000 season and had an 807–572–1 overall record.

From 2006 to 2008, the Norse played home games at what was then named Champion Window Field in nearby Florence.

The facility underwent $500,000 renovations in spring 2013, immediately prior to Northern Kentucky's first season in Division I. The infield grass was replaced with artificial turf. A new outfield fence, foul poles, and drainage system were also added. Prior to the 2017 home opener the outfield, warning track and bullpens were also resurfaced with artificial turf, making the entire playing surface synthetic.

== See also ==
- List of NCAA Division I baseball venues
