= Oakland Golden Grizzlies baseball =

Oakland Golden Grizzlies
- 2026 Oakland Golden Grizzlies baseball team
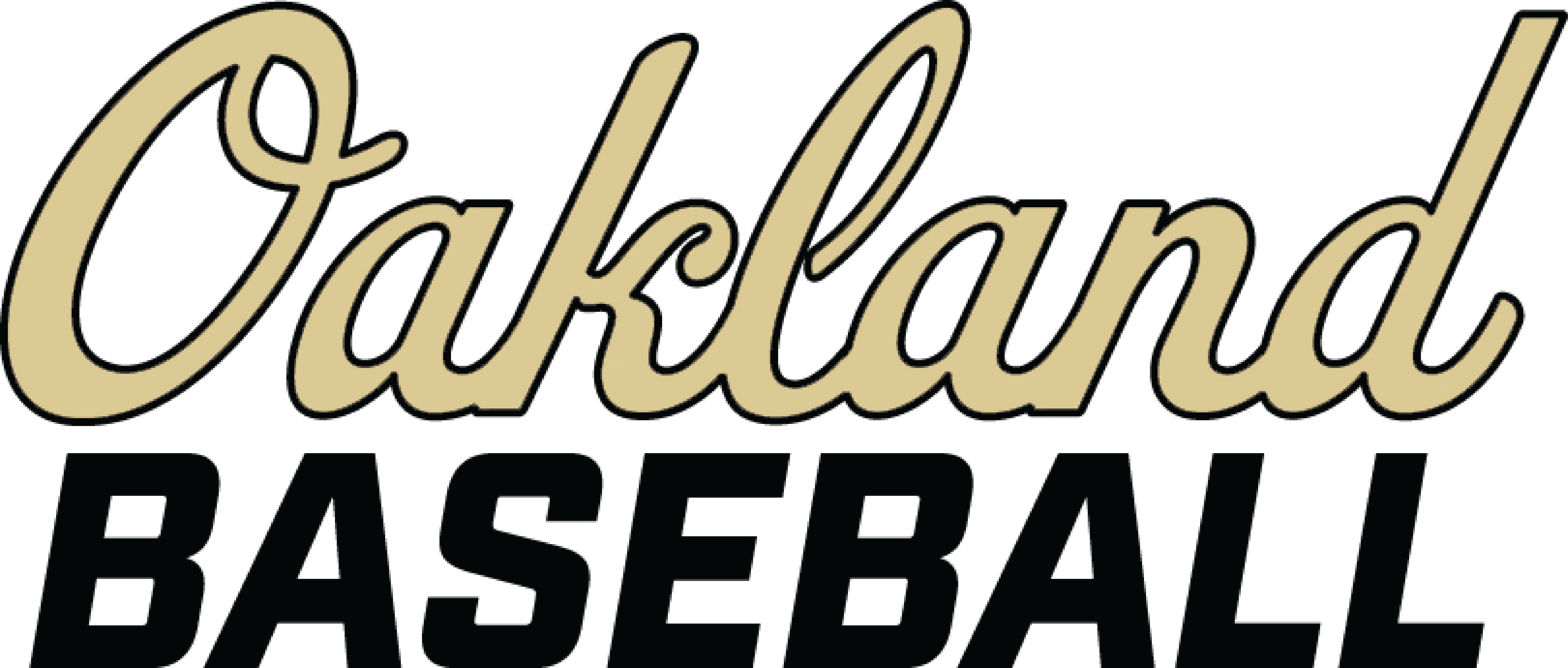
- Founded: 1970
- University: Oakland University
- Head coach: Brian Nelson
- Conference: Horizon League
- Location: Rochester Hills, Michigan
- Home stadium: Oakland University Baseball Field "The Den" (Capacity: 500)
- Nickname: Golden Grizzlies
- Colors: Black and gold

Conference regular season champions
- GLIAC: 1978

The Oakland Golden Grizzlies baseball team is a varsity intercollegiate athletic team of Oakland University. The team is a member of the Horizon League, which is part of the National Collegiate Athletic Association's Division I. The team plays its home games at Oakland University Baseball Field in Rochester Hills, Michigan.

Oakland won the Great Lakes Intercollegiate Athletic Conference (GLIAC) league championship in 1978.

== Head coaches ==
Year(s)	Coach	Seasons	W–L–T	Pct
1970–1971	Gene Bolden	2	22–34	.393
1972	John Scovill	1	14–18	.438
1973–1974	Bill Pfaff	2	38–28	.576
1975	Dick Robinson	1	27–15	.643
1976–1980	Dirk Dieters	5	126–102–2	.552
1987	Rob Righter	1	4–28	.125
1988–1993	Paul Chapoton	6	135–123	.523
1994–1998	Steve Lyon	5	113–101–1	.528
1999–2005	Mark Avery	7	129–241–1	.349
2006–2007	Dylan Putnam	2	40–72	.357
2008–2016	John Musachio	9	169–294	.365
2017–2019	Colin Kaline / Jacke Healey	3	43–109	.283
2020	Colin Kaline	1	2–10	.167
2021–2024	Jordon Banfield	4	109–114	.489
2025-Present	Brian Nelson	1	0-0	---
Totals	13	49	971–1,289–3	.430

Jacke Healey and Colin Kaline were named co-head coaches of the Oakland program on July 12, 2016. Healey was relieved of his duties as co-head coach in June, 2019. Kaline continued as the team's head coach. The team was coached solely be Kaline until his resignation in March 2020 for health reasons. On May 29, 2020, Jordon Banfield was named the programs new head coach. On July 12, 2024, Banfield resigned from Oakland to accept the Head Coach position at Cal-State Bakersfield. Brian Nelson was promoted and named the Interim Head Baseball Coach on July 17, 2024 for the 2025 Season.

== Major League Baseball ==
Oakland has had 19 Major League Baseball draft selections since the draft began in 1965. Don Kirkwood one of the only 2 OU players to have played in Major League Baseball. He played for the California Angels, Chicago White Sox and Toronto Blue Jays from 1974 to 1978. The other is Mike Brosseau of the Tampa Bay Rays although he went undrafted he made his way to the pros in though the Rays farm system.

Golden Grizzlies in the Major League Baseball Draft
Year	Player	Round	Team
1977	Thomas McWilliams	7	Baltimore Orioles
1978	James Dieters	32	St. Louis Cardinals
1987	Jim Kosnik	31	Kansas City Royals
1997	Matt McClellan	7	Toronto Blue Jays
2000	Erick Swanson	12	Seattle Mariners
2001	Adam Sokoll	21	Atlanta Braves
2002	David Viane	20	Seattle Mariners
2002	Jared Thomas	11	Seattle Mariners
2003	B. J. Brown	22	Anaheim Angels
2004	Brad Morenko	40	Cincinnati Reds
2004	Dominic Carmosino	27	Detroit Tigers
2004	Kyle Boehm	17	Baltimore Orioles
2005	Paul Phillips	9	Toronto Blue Jays
2007	Kevin Carkeek	25	Houston Astros
2009	Shane McCatty	34	Washington Nationals
2012	Hayden Fox	21	Miami Marlins
2014	Jacob Morton	39	Cleveland Indians
2014	Jake Paulson	27	Cincinnati Reds
2024	Brandon Decker	19	New York Yankees

== See also ==
- List of NCAA Division I baseball programs
