= Northern Kentucky Norse baseball =

Northern Kentucky Norse
- 2026 Northern Kentucky Norse baseball team
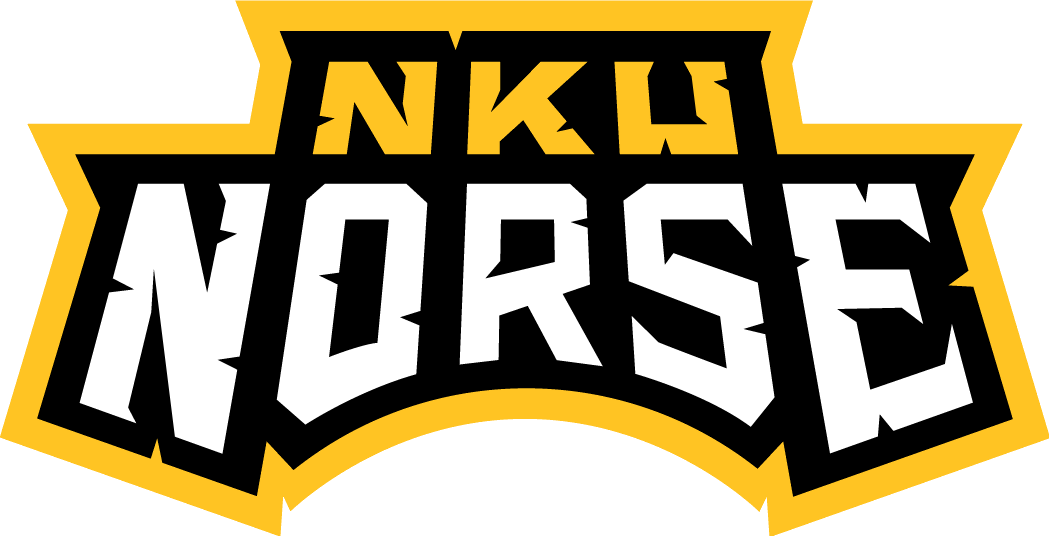
- Founded: 1972
- Conference history: Great Lakes Valley Conference (1987–2012); Atlantic Sun Conference (2013–2016); Horizon League (2017–present)
- University: Northern Kentucky University
- Athletic director: Ken Bothof
- Head coach: Dizzy Peyton (5th season)
- Conference: Horizon League
- Location: Highland Heights, Kentucky
- Home stadium: Bill Aker Baseball Complex (Capacity: 500)
- Nickname: Norse
- Colors: Black, gold, and white

College World Series appearances
- NAIA: 1985

NCAA tournament appearances
- Division I 2024 Division II; 1976, 1977, 1979, 1981, 1989, 1990, 2002, 2004, 2006, 2008, 2009, 2010, 2011, 2012 NAIA; 1984, 1985

Conference tournament champions
- Horizon: 2024

Conference regular season champions
- GLVC: 2002, 2004, 2006, 2008, 2009

The Northern Kentucky Norse baseball team is a varsity intercollegiate athletic team of Northern Kentucky University in Highland Heights, Kentucky, United States. The team is a member of the Horizon League, which is part of the National Collegiate Athletic Association's Division I. The team plays its home games at Bill Aker Baseball Complex in Highland Heights, Kentucky.

== History ==
=== Todd Asalon era (2001–2021) ===
After the 2012 season, Northern Kentucky made the step up to Division I, joining the Atlantic Sun Conference. In 2016, Northern Kentucky joined the Horizon League. 2017 would be the winningest Division I season under Asalon, with the Norse compiling a 25–33 record. On February 26, 2021, Todd Asalon announced that he would retire from the head coaching position at the end of the 2021 season.

=== Dizzy Peyton era (2022–present) ===
On June 6, 2021, Northern Kentucky announced that longtime assistant coach Dizzy Peyton would fill the head coaching vacancy left by Asalon's retirement.

== Northern Kentucky in the NCAA Tournament ==
Year	Record	Pct	Notes
2024	0–2	.000	Knoxville Regional
TOTALS	0–2	.000	

== Head coaches ==
Year(s)	Coach	Seasons	W–L–T	Pct
1972–2000	Bill Aker	29	807–572–1	.585
2001–2021	Todd Asalon	21	563–581–1	.493
2022–present	Dizzy Peyton	3	84–86	.494
Totals	3	53	1,454–1,239–2	.540

== See also ==
- List of NCAA Division I baseball programs
