= List of colleges and universities in Alabama =

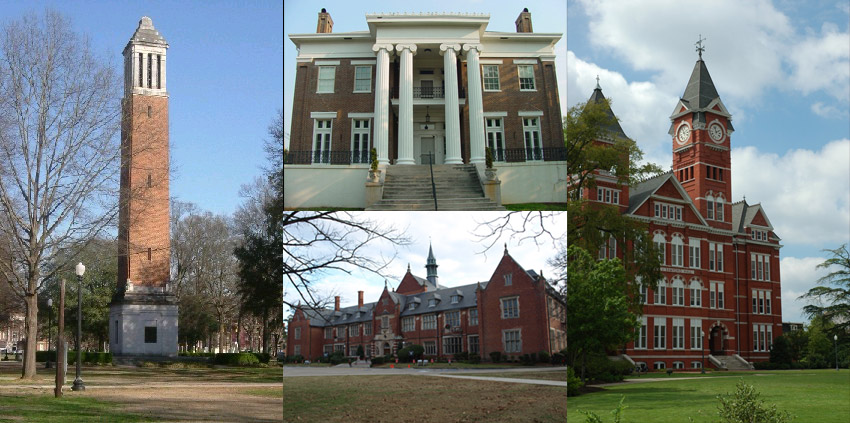
Clockwise from left: Denny Chimes at the University of Alabama, Rogers Hall at the University of North Alabama, Samford Hall at Auburn University, Flowers Hall at Huntingdon College

There are 60 colleges and universities in the U.S. state of Alabama. The University of Alabama in Tuscaloosa is the largest university in the state with 38,100 enrolled for fall 2019. Calhoun Community College in Tanner, Alabama is the largest two-year college, with an enrollment of 14,641. The smallest institution is Heritage Christian University, a Churches of Christ-affiliated seminary, with an enrollment of 86 students. The oldest institution is Athens State University in Athens founded in 1822. There are also 8 four-year and 3 two-year historically black colleges and universities which is more than any other state.

The majority of Alabama's colleges and universities are accredited by the Southern Association of Colleges and Schools (SACS), although several are accredited by the Association for Biblical Higher Education (ABHE), the Council on Occupational Education (COE), or the Distance Education Accrediting Commission (DEAC).

The University of Alabama at Birmingham, the University of South Alabama, the Alabama College of Osteopathic Medicine, and the Edward Via College of Osteopathic Medicine feature the only medical schools in the state. The University of Alabama School of Law, the Cumberland School of Law at Samford University, and the Thomas Goode Jones School of Law at Faulkner University are American Bar Association-accredited law schools. The Birmingham School of Law and Miles Law School (unaffiliated with Miles College) are state accredited law programs.

There are four institutions of higher learning in Alabama that are listed among Tier 1 national universities by U.S. News & World Report - The University of Alabama (UA), Auburn University (AU), the University of Alabama at Birmingham (UAB), and The University of Alabama in Huntsville (UAH).

These four universities are also classified among "R1: Doctoral Universities – Very high research activity: "The University of Alabama, The University of Alabama at Birmingham, The University of Alabama in Huntsville, and Auburn University as of February 2022.

== Institutions ==
Institution	Location(s)	Control	Type (Note: School types are based on the Carnegie Classification of Institutions of Higher Education.)	Enrollment (Fall 2024)	Founded	Accreditation
Air University	Montgomery	Public (Air Force)	Master's university	(Note: Air University is a professional military education institution of the United States Air Force. It is unclear how many Air University students are based in Alabama.)	1946	SACS
Alabama A&M University (Note: Historically black college or university)	Normal (Note: In addition to its main campus, Alabama A&M has an instructional site on the campus of Lawson State Community College in Birmingham.)	Public	Research university	7,295	1875	SACS
Alabama College of Osteopathic Medicine	Dothan	Private	Medical school	778	2010	AOA's COCA
Alabama State University	Montgomery	Public	Research University	4,081	1867	SACS
Amridge University	Montgomery	Private (Churches of Christ)	Special-focus institution (Bible college)	639	1967	SACS
Athens State University	Athens (Note: In addition to the main campus, Athens State offers programs, along with Calhoun Community College, at the Alabama Center for the Arts in Decatur)	Public	Baccalaureate college	2,986	1822	SACS
Auburn University	Auburn	Public	Research university	34,145	1856	SACS
Auburn University at Montgomery	Montgomery	Public	Master's university	5,217	1967	SACS
Bevill State Community College	Sumiton (Note: Bevill State has campus locations in Sumiton, Fayette, Hamilton, and Jasper, and has an instructional center in Carrollton.)	Public	Associate's college	4,378	1963	SACS
Birmingham School of Law	Birmingham	Private	Law school		1915	Alabama Bar Association
Bishop State Community College	Mobile	Public	Associate's college	4,001	1927	SACS
Calhoun Community College	Tanner (Note: In addition to the main campus in Tanner, Calhoun Community College has locations in Huntsville and at the Limestone Correctional Facility. It also offers programs, along with Athens State University, at the Alabama Center for the Arts in Decatur)	Public	Associate's college	14,641	1965 (Note: Created in 1965 as a merger of two institutions founded in 1947 and 1963)	SACS
Central Alabama Community College	Alexander City (Note: Central Alabama has locations in Alexander City, Childersburg, Prattville, and Talladega.)	Public	Associate's college	2,140	1989 (Note: Created in 1989 as a merger of two institutions, both founded in 1963)	SACS
Chattahoochee Valley Community College	Phenix City (Note: In addition to its main campus, Chattahoochee Valley Community College has an instructional site at Fort Benning, Georgia.)	Public	Associate's college	1,705	1974	SACS
Coastal Alabama Community College	Bay Minette (Note: Coastal Alabama has locations in Bay Minette, Fairhope, Gulf Shores, Atmore, Brewton, Gilbertown, Jackson, Monroeville, and Thomasville.)	Public	Associate's college	10,023	1965	SACS
Columbia Southern University	Orange Beach	Private (For-profit)	Master's university	17,763 (Note: Columbia Southern University is an online-only institution. It is unclear how many students are based in Alabama.)	1993	DEAC
Community College of the Air Force	Montgomery	Public (Air Force)	Associate's college	(Note: The Community College of the Air Force enrolls over 370,000 students at sites in 36 states, the District of Columbia, and six foreign locations. It is unclear how many are located in Alabama.)	1979 (Note: Founded in 1972 in Texas, moved to Alabama in 1979)	SACS (Note: The Community College of the Air Force is accredited by SACS through its parent organization, Air University.)
Enterprise State Community College	Enterprise (Note: In addition to the main campus in Enterprise, Enterprise State has two Alabama Aviation College locations in Andalusia and Ozark)	Public	Associate's college	2,699	1965	SACS
Faulkner University	Montgomery (Note: In addition to the main campus in Montgomery, Faulkner University has instructional sites in Hoover, Huntsville, and Mobile.)	Private (Churches of Christ)	Baccalaureate college	3,086	1942	SACS
Gadsden State Community College	Gadsden (Note: Gadsden State has campus locations in Gadsden and Anniston, and also has an instructional site in Centre.)	Public	Associate's college	5,071	1985 (Note: Created in 1985 as a merger of three institutions founded in 1925, 1960, and 1965)	SACS
H. Councill Trenholm State Community College	Montgomery	Public	Associate's college	2,046	1966	SACS
Heritage Christian University	Florence	Private (Churches of Christ)	Special-focus institution (Bible college)	178	1971	ABHE
Highlands College	Birmingham	Private (Association of Related Churches)	Special-focus institution (Bible college)		2011	ABHE (candidate)
Huntingdon College	Montgomery	Private (United Methodist Church)	Baccalaureate college	892	1854	SACS
Huntsville Bible College	Huntsville	Private (Interdenominational)	Special-focus institution (Bible college)	98	1986	ABHE
J.F. Drake State Community and Technical College	Huntsville	Public	Associate's college	1,187	1961	SACS
J. F. Ingram State Technical College	Deatsville	Public	Associate's college	960 (Note: All students at J.F. Ingram State Technical College are incarcerated adults)	1965	COE
Jacksonville State University	Jacksonville	Public	Master's university	9,955	1883	SACS
Jefferson State Community College	Birmingham (Note: Jefferson State has locations in Birmingham, Hoover, Clanton, and Pell City.)	Public	Associate's college	13,082	1965	SACS
Lawson State Community College	Birmingham (Note: Lawson State has locations in Birmingham and Bessemer)	Public	Associate's college	3,453	1950	SACS
Lurleen B. Wallace Community College	Andalusia (Note: Lurleen B. Wallace has campus locations in Andalusia, Greenville, and Opp, and has an instructional site in Luverne.)	Public	Associate's college	2,062	1969	SACS
Marion Military Institute	Marion	Public	Associate's college	332	1842	SACS
Miles College	Fairfield	Private (Christian Methodist Episcopal Church)	Baccalaureate college	1,180	1905	SACS
Miles Law School	Fairfield	Private	Law school		1974	Alabama Bar Association
Northeast Alabama Community College	Rainsville	Public	Associate's college	3,208	1963	SACS
Northwest–Shoals Community College	Muscle Shoals (Note: Northwest–Shoals has a location in Phil Campbell.)	Public	Associate's college	4,665	1993 (Note: Created in 1993 as a merger of two institutions founded in 1963 and 1966)	SACS
Oakwood University	Huntsville	Private (Seventh-day Adventist Church)	Baccalaureate college	1,226	1896	SACS
Reid State Technical College	Evergreen	Public	Associate's college	641	1966	COE
Samford University	Birmingham	Private (Christian)	Master's university	6,097	1841	SACS
Selma University	Selma	Private (National Missionary Baptist Convention of America)	Special-focus institution (Bible college)	95	1878	ABHE
Shelton State Community College	Tuscaloosa	Public	Associate's college	4,601	1979 (Note: Created in 1979 as a merger of two institutions founded in 1952 and 1972)	SACS
Snead State Community College	Boaz (Note: In addition to its main campus, Snead State has instructional sites in Arab and Albertville.)	Public	Associate's college	2,917	1898	SACS
Southern Union State Community College	Wadley (Note: Southern Union has locations in Wadley, Opelika, and Valley.)	Public	Associate's college	5,063	1994 (Note: Created in 1994 as a merger of two institutions founded in 1922 and 1963)	SACS
Spring Hill College	Mobile	Private (Roman Catholic Church)	Master's university	919	1830	SACS
Stillman College	Tuscaloosa	Private (Presbyterian Church of the USA)	Baccalaureate college	731	1876	SACS
Talladega College	Talladega	Private (United Church of Christ)	Baccalaureate college	760	1867	SACS
Troy University	Troy (Note: Troy has locations in Troy, Dothan, Montgomery, and Phenix City, in addition to locations in 15 other states and 6 countries.)	Public	Master's university	13,658	1887	SACS
Tuskegee University	Tuskegee	Private	Research University	3,121	1881	SACS
United States Sports Academy	Daphne	Private	Special-focus institution	367	1972	SACS
University of Alabama	Tuscaloosa	Public	Research university	40,846	1831	SACS
University of Alabama at Birmingham	Birmingham	Public	Research university	20,905	1966	SACS
University of Alabama in Huntsville	Huntsville	Public	Research university	8,564	1949	SACS
University of Mobile	Prichard	Private (Southern Baptist Convention)	Master's university	1,545	1961	SACS
University of Montevallo	Montevallo	Public	Master's university	3,088	1896	SACS
University of North Alabama	Florence	Public	Master's university	10,204	1830	SACS
University of South Alabama	Mobile (Note: In addition to the main campus in Mobile, the University of South Alabama has a satellite campus in Fairhope.)	Public	Research university	14,003	1963	SACS
University of West Alabama	Livingston	Public	Master's university	6,820	1835	SACS
Wallace Community College	Dothan (Note: Wallace has locations in Dothan and Eufaula)	Public	Associate's college	4,044	1949	SACS
Wallace Community College Selma	Selma	Public	Associate's college	1,925	1963	SACS
Wallace State Community College	Hanceville (Note: In addition to the Hanceville campus, Wallace State has an instructional site in Oneonta)	Public	Associate's college	6,424	1966	SACS

== Out-of-state institutions ==
Institution	Location(s)	Control	Accreditation	Notes
Columbia College Missouri	Redstone Arsenal	Private	HLC	
Edward Via College of Osteopathic Medicine	Auburn	Private	AOA's COCA	VCOM-Auburn is located on the Auburn University campus.
Embry-Riddle Aeronautical University	Huntsville, Fort Novosel, Mobile	Private	SACS	ERAU has four instructional sites in Alabama: one in Huntsville, one at Fort Novosel, and two in Mobile.
Florida Institute of Technology	Huntsville	Private	SACS	
Southeastern University	Birmingham, Cullman, Florence, Huntsville	Private (Assemblies of God)	SACS	Students are able to pursue a degree from Southeastern University while dually-enrolled at Highlands College in Birmingham. Additionally, SEU has instructional sites at four churches in Birmingham, Cullman, Florence, and Huntsville.
United States Army Command and General Staff College	Redstone Arsenal	Public (Army)	HLC	

Additionally, several for-profit colleges and universities based in other states have campuses in Alabama:

- Fortis Institute has campuses in Birmingham, Dothan, Mobile, and Montgomery
- Herzing University has a campus in Birmingham
- Remington College has a campus in Mobile
- South University has a campus in Montgomery
- Strayer University has a campus in Birmingham

== Defunct institutions ==
Institution	Location(s)	Control	Type	Founded	Closed	Ref
Alabama Presbyterian College	Anniston	Private	Baccalaureate college	1906	1918	
Concordia College Alabama	Selma	Private (Lutheran Church–Missouri Synod)	Baccalaureate college	1922	2018	
Daniel Payne College	Birmingham	Private (AME)	Baccalaureate college	1889	1979	
Judson College	Marion	Private (Southern Baptist Convention)	Baccalaureate college	1838	2021	
Southeastern Bible College	Birmingham	Private (Interdenominational)	Special-focus institution (Bible college)	1934	2017	
Southern Benedictine College	Cullman	Private (Catholic)	Baccalaureate college	1929	1979	
Virginia College	Birmingham (Note: Virginia College has locations in Birmingham, Huntsville, Mobile, and Montgomery, in addition to 21 locations in other states.)	Private (for-profit)	Baccalaureate/Associate's college	1983	2018	
Birmingham–Southern College	Birmingham	Private (United Methodist Church)	Baccalaureate college	1856	2024	

== See also ==
- List of college athletic programs in Alabama
- Higher education in the United States
- List of American institutions of higher education
- List of recognized higher education accreditation organizations
