= List of college athletic programs in Alabama =

This is a list of college athletic programs in the U.S. state of Alabama.

== NCAA ==
=== Division I ===
Full NCAA Division I member colleges in Alabama. - FBS Football, - FCS Football

Team	School	City	Conference	Sport sponsorship								
Team	School	City	Conference	Football	Basketball		Baseball	Softball	Ice Hockey		Soccer	
Team	School	City	Conference	Football	M	W	Baseball	Softball	M	W	M	W
Alabama Crimson Tide	University of Alabama	Tuscaloosa	SEC	FBS	Yes	Yes	Yes	Yes	No	No	No	Yes
Alabama A&M Bulldogs and Lady Bulldogs	Alabama Agricultural and Mechanical University	Normal	SWAC	FCS	Yes	Yes	Yes	Yes	No	No	No	Yes
Alabama State Hornets and Lady Hornets	Alabama State University	Montgomery	SWAC	FCS	Yes	Yes	Yes	Yes	No	No	No	Yes
Auburn Tigers	Auburn University	Auburn	SEC	FBS	Yes	Yes	Yes	Yes	No	No	No	Yes
Jacksonville State Gamecocks	Jacksonville State University	Jacksonville	C-USA	FBS	Yes	Yes	Yes	Yes	No	No	No	Yes
North Alabama Lions	University of North Alabama	Florence	UAC	FCS	Yes	Yes	Yes	Yes	No	No	No	Yes
Samford Bulldogs	Samford University	Birmingham	Southern	FCS	Yes	Yes	Yes	Yes	No	No	No	Yes
South Alabama Jaguars	University of South Alabama	Mobile	Sun Belt	FBS	Yes	Yes	Yes	Yes	No	No	No	Yes
Troy Trojans	Troy University	Troy	Sun Belt	FBS	Yes	Yes	Yes	Yes	No	No	No	Yes
UAB Blazers	University of Alabama at Birmingham	Birmingham	AAC	FBS	Yes	Yes	Yes	Yes	No	No	Yes	Yes

=== Division II ===
Full NCAA Division II member colleges in Alabama. - Football, - Non-football

Team	School	City	Conference	Sport sponsorship								
Team	School	City	Conference	Football	Basketball		Baseball	Softball	Ice hockey		Soccer	
Team	School	City	Conference	Football	M	W	Baseball	Softball	M	W	M	W
AUM Warhawks	Auburn University at Montgomery	Montgomery	Gulf South	No	Yes	Yes	Yes	Yes	No	No	Yes	Yes
Miles Golden Bears	Miles College	Fairfield	SIAC	Yes	Yes	Yes	Yes	Yes	No	No	No	No
Montevallo Falcons	University of Montevallo	Montevallo	Gulf South	No	Yes	Yes	Yes	Yes	No	No	Yes	Yes
Spring Hill Badgers	Spring Hill College	Mobile	SIAC	No	Yes	Yes	Yes	Yes	No	No	Yes (Note: Spring Hill's soccer teams compete in the Gulf South Conference.)	Yes
Tuskegee Golden Tigers	Tuskegee University	Tuskegee	SIAC	Yes	Yes	Yes	Yes	Yes	No	No	No	No
UAH Chargers	University of Alabama in Huntsville	Huntsville	Gulf South	No	Yes	Yes	Yes	Yes	No	No	Yes	Yes
West Alabama Tigers	University of West Alabama	Livingston	Gulf South	Yes	Yes	Yes	Yes	Yes	No	No	Yes	Yes

=== Division III ===
Full NCAA Division III member colleges in Alabama.

Team	School	City	Conference	Sport sponsorship								
Team	School	City	Conference	Football	Basketball		Baseball	Softball	Ice Hockey		Soccer	
Team	School	City	Conference	Football	M	W	Baseball	Softball	M	W	M	W
Huntingdon Hawks	Huntingdon College	Montgomery	CCS (Note: Huntingdon's football team competes in USA South.)	Yes	Yes	Yes	Yes	Yes	No	No	Yes	Yes

== NAIA ==
Full NAIA member colleges in Alabama. - Football, - Non-football

Team	School	City	Conference	Sport sponsorship						
Team	School	City	Conference	Football	Basketball		Baseball	Softball	Soccer	
Team	School	City	Conference	Football	M	W	Baseball	Softball	M	W
Faulkner Eagles	Faulkner University	Montgomery	Southern States	Yes (Note: Faulkner's football team competes in the Mid-South Conference.)	Yes	Yes	Yes	Yes	Yes	Yes
Mobile Rams	University of Mobile	Mobile	Southern States	No	Yes	Yes	Yes	Yes	Yes	Yes
Oakwood Ambassadors	Oakwood University	Huntsville	HBCU	No	Yes	Yes	No	No	Yes	Yes
Stillman Tigers	Stillman College	Tuscaloosa	HBCU	No	Yes	Yes	Yes	Yes	No	No
Talladega Tornadoes	Talladega College	Talladega	HBCU	No	Yes	Yes	Yes	Yes	Yes	Yes
USSU Eagles	United States Sports University	Daphne	Continental	No	No	No	Yes	Yes	Yes	Yes

== NJCAA ==
Full NJCAA member colleges in Alabama.

Team	School	City	Conference
Bishop State Wildcats	Bishop State Community College	Mobile	Alabama CC
Calhoun Warhawks	Calhoun Community College	Tanner	Alabama CC
Central Alabama Trojans	Central Alabama Community College	Alexander City	Alabama CC
Chattahoochee Valley Pirates	Chattahoochee Valley Community College	Phenix City	Alabama CC
Enterprise State Boll Weevils	Enterprise State Community College	Enterprise	Alabama CC
Coastal Alabama North Eagles	Coastal Alabama Community College Monroeville	Monroeville	Alabama CC
Coastal Alabama South Sun Chiefs	Coastal Alabama Community College	Bay Minette	Alabama CC
Coastal Alabama Brewton Warhawks	Coastal Alabama Community College Brewton	Brewton	Alabama CC
Gadsden State Cardinals	Gadsden State Community College	Gadsden	Alabama CC
Lawson State Cougars	Lawson State Community College	Birmingham	Alabama CC
Lurleen B. Wallace Saints	Lurleen B. Wallace Community College	Andalusia	Alabama CC
Marion Military Tigers	Marion Military Institute	Marion	Alabama CC
Reid State Lions	Reid State Technical College	Evergreen	Alabama CC
Shelton State Buccaneers	Shelton State Community College	Tuscaloosa	Alabama CC
Snead State Parsons	Snead State Community College	Boaz	Alabama CC
Southern Union State Bison	Southern Union State Community College	Wadley	Alabama CC
Wallace-Dothan Governors	Wallace Community College	Dothan	Alabama CC
Wallace-Selma Patriots	Wallace Community College Selma	Selma	Alabama CC
Wallace State Lions	Wallace State Community College	Hanceville	Alabama CC

== USCAA ==
Team	School	City
USSU Eagles	United States Sports University	Daphne

== See also ==
- List of NCAA Division I institutions
- List of NCAA Division II institutions
- List of NCAA Division III institutions
- List of NAIA institutions
- List of USCAA institutions
- List of NCCAA institutions
- List of NJCAA Division I institutions
- List of NJCAA Division II institutions
- List of NJCAA Division III institutions
