= List of NJCAA Division I schools =

There are 242 Division I teams in the National Junior College Athletic Association (NJCAA) that play in 24 different regions. This makes it the largest division in the NJCAA by school count.

These schools are allowed to offer full athletic scholarships, totaling a maximum of tuition, fees, room and board, course-related books, up to $250 in course-required supplies, and transportation costs one time per academic year to and from the college by direct route.

== Members ==
=== Alabama ===
- Bevill State Community College Bears in Sumiton
- Bishop State Community College Wildcats in Mobile
- Calhoun Community College Warhawks in Tanner
- Chattahoochee Valley Community College Pirates in Phenix City
- Central Alabama Community College Trojans in Alexander City
- Coastal Alabama Community College Sun Chiefs in Bay Minette
- Coastal Alabama Community College Brewton Warhawks in Brewton
- Coastal Alabama Community College Monroeville Eagles in Monroeville
- Enterprise-Ozark Community College Boll Weevils in Enterprise
- Gadsden State Community College Cardinals in Gadsden
- Lawson State Community College Cougars in Birmingham
- Lurleen B. Wallace Community College Saints in Andalusia
- Marion Military Institute Tigers in Marion
- Northeast Alabama Community College Mustangs in Rainsville
- Shelton State Community College Buccaneers in Tuscaloosa
- Snead State Community College Parsons in Boaz
- Southern Union State Community College Bison in Wadley
- Wallace Community College Governors in Dothan
- Wallace Community College Selma Patriots in Selma
- Wallace State Community College Lions in Hanceville

=== Arizona ===
- Arizona Western College Matadors in Yuma
- Central Arizona College Vaqueros/Vaqueras in Coolidge
- Cochise College Apaches in Douglas
- Eastern Arizona College Gila Monsters in Thatcher
- Mesa Community College Thunderbird in Mesa
- Mohave Community College Bighorns in Bullhead City
- Pima Community College Aztecs in Tucson
- Yavapai College Roughriders in Prescott

=== California ===
- Community Christian College Saints in Redlands

=== Colorado ===
- Colorado Northwestern Community College Spartan in Rangely
- Lamar Community College Runnin' Lopes in Lamar
- Northeastern Junior College Plainsmen in Sterling
- Otero College Rattlers in La Junta
- Trinidad State College Trojans in Trinidad

=== Florida ===
- ASA College Silver Storm in Miami
- Broward College Seahawks in Fort Lauderdale
- Chipola College Indians in Marianna
- College of Central Florida Patriots in Ocala
- Daytona State College Falcons in Daytona Beach
- Eastern Florida State College Titans in Brevard County (formerly known as Brevard Community College)
- Florida SouthWestern State College Buccaneers in Fort Myers (formerly known as Edison Community College)
- Florida State College at Jacksonville Blue Wave in Jacksonville
- Gulf Coast State College Commodores in Panama City
- Hillsborough Community College Hawks in Tampa
- Indian River State College Pioneers in Fort Pierce
- Lake–Sumter State College Lakehawks in Leesburg
- Miami-Dade College Sharks in Miami
- North Florida Community College Sentinels in Madison
- Northwest Florida State College Raiders in Niceville
- Palm Beach State College Panthers in Lake Worth
- Pensacola State College Pirates in Pensacola
- Polk State College Eagles in Winter Haven
- Santa Fe College Saints in Gainesville
- Seminole State College of Florida Raiders in Sanford
- South Florida State College Panthers in Avon Park
- State College of Florida, Manatee–Sarasota Manatees in Bradenton (formerly known as Manatee Community College)
- St. Johns River State College Vikings in Palatka
- St. Petersburg College Titans in St. Petersburg
- Tallahassee Community College Eagles in Tallahassee

=== Georgia ===
- Albany Technical College Titans in Albany
- Atlanta Metropolitan College Trailblazers in Atlanta
- Chattahoochee Technical College Golden Eagles in Marietta
- Georgia Highlands College Chargers in Rome
- Georgia Military College Bulldogs in Milledgeville
- Gordon State College Highlanders in Barnesville
- South Georgia Technical College Jets in Americus
- Waycross College Swamp Foxes in Waycross

=== Idaho ===
- North Idaho College Cardinals in Coeur d'Alene
- College of Southern Idaho Golden Eagles in Twin Falls

=== Illinois ===
- Frontier Community College Bobcats in Fairfield
- John A. Logan College Volunteers in Carterville
- Kaskaskia College Blue Devils (Boys)/Blue Angels (Girls) in Centralia
- Kishwaukee College Kougars in Malta
- Lake Land College Lakers in Mattoon
- Lincoln Trail College Statesman in Robinson
- Olney Central College Blue Knights in Olney
- Shawnee Community College Saints in Ullin
- South Suburban College Bulldogs in South Holland
- Southeastern Illinois College Falcons in Harrisburg
- Southwestern Illinois College Blue Storm in Belleville
- Triton College Trojans in River Grove
- Wabash Valley College Warriors in Mount Carmel

=== Indiana ===
- Vincennes University Trailblazers in Vincennes

=== Iowa ===
- Ellsworth Community College Panthers in Iowa Falls
- Hawkeye Community College Redtails in Waterloo
- Indian Hills Community College-Ottumwa Warriors in Ottumwa (Falcons in Baseball)
- Iowa Central Community College Tritons in Fort Dodge
- Iowa Lakes Community College Lakers in Estherville
- Iowa Western Community College Reivers in Council Bluffs
- Marshalltown Community College Tigers in Marshalltown

=== Kansas ===
- Allen Community College Red Devils In Iola
- Barton County Community College Cougars in Great Bend
- Butler County Community College (Kansas) Grizzly Bears in El Dorado
- Cloud County Community College Thunderbirds/Lady Thunderbirds in Concordia
- Coffeyville Community College Ravens in Coffeyville
- Colby Community College Trojans in Colby
- Cowley County Community College Tigers in Arkansas City
- Dodge City Community College Conquistadors in Dodge City
- Garden City Community College Broncbusters in Garden City
- Hutchinson Community College Blue Dragons in Hutchinson
- Independence Community College Pirates in Independence
- Northwest Kansas Technical College Mavericks in Goodland
- Pratt Community College Beavers in Pratt
- Seward County Community College Saints in Liberal

=== Kentucky ===
- Simmons College of Kentucky Falcons in Louisville

=== Louisiana ===
- Baton Rouge Community College Bears in Baton Rouge
- Bossier Parish Community College Cavaliers in Bossier
- Delgado Community College Dolphins in New Orleans
- Southern University at Shreveport Jaguars in Shreveport
- Louisiana State University at Eunice Bengals in Eunice

=== Maryland ===
- Allegany College of Maryland Trojans in Cumberland
- Carroll Community College Lynx in Westminster
- Chesapeake College Skipjacks in Wye Mills
- Garrett College Lakers in McHenry
- Frederick Community College Cougars in Frederick
- Hagerstown Community College Hawks in Hagerstown
- Harford Community College Fighting Owls in Bel Air
- Montgomery College Raptors in Germantown, Rockville, and Takoma Park/Silver Spring

=== Mississippi ===
- Coahoma Community College Tigers in Clarksdale
- Copiah-Lincoln Community College Wolves in Wesson
- East Central Community College Warriors in Decatur
- East Mississippi Community College Lions in Scooba
- Hinds Community College Eagles in Raymond
- Holmes Community College Bulldogs in Goodman
- Itawamba Community College Indians in Fulton
- Jones County Junior College Bobcats in Ellisville
- Meridian Community College Eagles in Meridian
- Mississippi Delta Community College Trojans in Moorhead
- Mississippi Gulf Coast Community College Bulldogs in Perkinston
- Northeast Mississippi Community College Tigers in Booneville
- Northwest Mississippi Community College Rangers in Senatobia
- Pearl River Community College Wildcats in Poplarville
- Southwest Mississippi Community College Bears in Summit

=== Missouri ===
- Crowder College Roughriders in Neosho
- Mineral Area College Cardinals in Park Hills
- Missouri State University-West Plains Grizzlies in West Plains
- Moberly Area Community College Greyhounds in Moberly
- State Fair Community College Roadrunners in Sedalia
- Three Rivers Community College Raiders in Poplar Bluff
- St. Charles Community College Cougars in Saint Charles

=== Montana ===
- Dawson Community College Buccaneers in Glendive
- Little Big Horn College Rams in Crow Agency
- Miles Community College Pioneers in Miles City

=== Nebraska ===
- McCook Community College Indians in McCook
- North Platte Community College Knights in North Platte
- Northeast Community College Hawks in Norfolk
- Western Nebraska Community College Cougars in Scotts Bluff

=== Nevada ===
- College of Southern Nevada Coyotes in Henderson
- Western Nevada College Wildcats in Carson City

=== New Mexico ===
- Eastern New Mexico University in Ruidoso
- New Mexico Junior College Thunderbirds in Hobbs
- New Mexico Military Institute Broncos in Roswell
- Mesalands Community College Stampede in Tucumcari

=== New York ===
- Monroe University Mustangs in New Rochelle

=== North Carolina ===
- Brunswick Community College Dolphins in Bolivia
- Cape Fear Community College Sea Devils in Wilmington
- Lenoir Community College Lancers in Kinston
- Louisburg College Hurricanes in Louisburg
- Pitt Community College Bulldogs in Winterville
- Roanoke-Chowan Community College Waves in Ahoskie
- Rockingham Community College Eagles in Wentworth
- Surry Community College Knights in Dobson
- Wake Technical Community College Eagles in Raleigh
- Wilkes Community College Cougars in Wilkesboro
- Gaston College Rhinos

=== North Dakota ===
- Lake Region State College Royals in Devils Lake
- North Dakota State College of Science Wildcats in Wahpeton
- Williston State College Tetons in Williston

=== Ohio ===
- Hocking College Hawks in Nelsonville

=== Oklahoma ===
- Carl Albert State College Vikings in Poteau
- Connors State College Cowboys in Conner
- Eastern Oklahoma State College Mountaineers in Wilburton
- Murray State College Aggies in Tishomingo
- Northeastern Oklahoma A&M College Golden Norseman in Miami
- Northern Oklahoma College Enid Jets in Enid
- Northern Oklahoma College-Tonkawa Mavericks in Tonkawa
- Redlands Community College Cougars in El Reno
- Seminole State College Trojans in Seminole
- Western Oklahoma State College Pioneers in Altus

=== Pennsylvania ===
- Lackawanna College Falcons in Scranton

=== South Carolina ===
- Aiken Technical College Knights in Aiken
- Clinton Junior College Golden Bears in Rock Hill
- Denmark Technical College Panthers in Denmark
- University of South Carolina Lancaster Lancers in Lancaster
- University of South Carolina Salkehatchie Indians in Allendale
- University of South Carolina Sumter Fire Ants in Sumter

=== Tennessee ===
- Chattanooga State Technical Community College Tigers in Chattanooga
- Cleveland State Community College Cougars in Cleveland
- Columbia State Community College Chargers in Columbia
- Dyersburg State Community College Eagles in Dyersburg
- Jackson State Community College Green Jays in Jackson
- Motlow State Community College Bucks in Lynchburg
- Pellissippi State Community College Panthers in Knoxville
- Roane State Community College Raider in Harriman
- Southwest Tennessee Community College Salquis in Memphis
- Volunteer State Community College Pioneers in Gallatin
- Walters State Community College Senators in Morristown

=== Texas ===
- Angelina College Roadrunners in Lufkin
- Blinn College Buccaneers in Brenham
- Clarendon College Bulldogs in Clarendon
- Cisco College Wranglers in Cisco
- Coastal Bend College Cougars in Beeville
- Collin College Cougars in Collin County
- Frank Phillips College Plainsmen in Borger
- Grayson County College Vikings in Denison
- Hill College Rebels in Hillsboro
- Howard College Hawks in Big Spring
- Jacksonville College Jaguars/Lady Jaguars in Jacksonville
- Kilgore College Rangers in Kilgore
- Lee College Runnin' Rebels in Baytown
- McLennan Community College Highlanders in Waco
- Midland College Chaparrals in Midland
- Navarro College Bulldogs in Corsicana
- Northeast Texas Community College Eagles in Mount Pleasant
- Odessa College Wranglers in Odessa
- Panola College Ponies in Carthage
- Paris Junior College Dragons in Paris
- Ranger College Rangers in Ranger
- San Jacinto College-Central Gators in Pasadena
- South Plains College Texans in Lubbock
- Southwestern Christian College Rams in Terrell
- Temple College Leopards in Temple
- Texas Southmost College Scorpions in Brownsville
- Trinity Valley Community College Cardinals in Athens
- Tyler Junior College Apaches in Tyler
- Western Texas College Westerners in Snyder
- Wharton County Junior College Pioneers in Wharton

=== Utah ===
- Salt Lake Community College Bruin Bears in Salt Lake
- Snow College Badgers in Ephraim
- Utah State University Eastern Eagles in Price

=== Washington ===
- Big Bend Community College Vikings in Moses Lake
- Pacific Northwest Christian College Gladiators in Kennewick

=== West Virginia ===
- Potomac State College of West Virginia University Catamounts in Keyser

=== Wyoming ===
- Casper College Thunderbirds in Casper
- Central Wyoming College Rustlers in Riverton
- Eastern Wyoming College Lancers in Torrington
- Gillette College Pronghorns in Gillette
- Laramie County Community College Golden Eagles in Cheyenne
- Northwest College Trappers in Powell
- Sheridan College Generals in Gillette
- Western Wyoming Community College Mustangs in Rock Springs

== Note ==
The schools listed above may not compete in Division I in all sports. For instance, many schools in Kansas compete in Division I basketball while competing in Division II in softball and volleyball. Highland (Kan.) and Johnson County compete in Division I baseball but have Division II teams in all other sports (except Highland football because NJCAA football is not split into divisions).

== See also ==
- List of NJCAA Division II schools
- List of NJCAA Division III schools
- List of junior college football programs in the United States
- List of USCAA institutions
- List of NCCAA institutions
- List of NAIA institutions
- List of NCAA Division I institutions
- List of NCAA Division II institutions
- List of NCAA Division III institutions
