= Alabama Community College System =

System of public community colleges in the U.S. state of Alabama

- Type: Public community college system
- Established: 1963; 63 years ago
- Chancellor: Goodrich 'Dus' Rogers
- Vice-Chancellor: Valerie Gray
- Students: 168,000
- Website: www.accs.edu

The Alabama Community College System (ACCS) is the system of public community colleges in the U.S. state of Alabama. It consists of 24 community and technical colleges in the state which offer 2-to-4-year transfer, dual enrollment, technical training, adult education, and community education.

The Alabama Community College System was founded 1963 when the public two-year colleges in Alabama were linked into a single system governed by the State Board of Education. The system was separated from the State Board of Education and put under control of the Department of Postsecondary Education in 1982.

== Institutions ==
Location of ACCS campuses. For colleges with multiple campuses, the largest campus is labeled. Red dots represent member institutions of Coastal Alabama Community College.

Alabama Community Colleges
Name	Established	Enrollment	County
Bevill State Community College	1992	5,410	Fayette; Marion; Walker
Bishop State Community College	1927	4,423	Mobile; Washington
Calhoun Community College	1946	14,641	Limestone
Central Alabama Community College	1989	2,225	Tallapoosa
Chattahoochee Valley Community College	1973	2,191	Russell
Coastal Alabama Community College	1965	10,023	Baldwin; Choctaw; Clarke; Escambia; Monroe
Drake State Community and Technical College	1961	1,119	Madison
Enterprise State Community College	1965	2,353	Coffee
Gadsden State Community College	1925	6,456	Calhoun; Cherokee; Etowah
Ingram State Technical College (for incarcerated adults)	1965	806	Elmore
Jefferson State Community College	1965	13,082	Chilton; Jefferson; Shelby; St. Clair
Lawson State Community College	1949	4,644	Jefferson
Lurleen B. Wallace Community College	1969	2,316	Butler; Covington
Marion Military Institute	1842	417	Perry
Northeast Alabama Community College	1963	3,963	DeKalb
Northwest-Shoals Community College	1993	4,788	Colbert; Franklin
Reid State Technical College	1963	565	Conecuh
Shelton State Community College	1994	6,757	Tuscaloosa
Snead State Community College	1898	4,160	Marshall
Southern Union State Community College	1922	6,678	Chambers; Lee; Randolph
Trenholm State Community College	1963	2,535	Montgomery
Wallace Community College – Dothan	1947	5,983	Dale
Wallace Community College – Selma	1963	2,310	Dallas
Wallace State Community College – Hanceville	1966	6,687	Cullman

== See also ==
- List of colleges and universities in Alabama
