= Alabama Community College Conference =

Athletic conference of the community colleges in Alabama

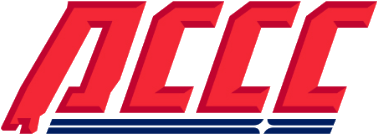
- Association: NJCAA
- Sports fielded: 7
- Division: Division I
- No. of teams: 23
- Country: United States
- Region: Alabama – NJCAA Region 22
- Website: acccathletics.com

The Alabama Community College Conference (ACCC) is a collegiate athletic conference located in the U. S. state of Alabama. It is a member of the National Junior College Athletic Association (NJCAA), representing NJCAA Region 22.

== Member schools ==
The ACCC currently has 23 full members, all are public schools. All members of the Alabama Community College System except J. F. Ingram State Technical College and Trenholm State Community College are represented. Coastal Alabama Community College maintains two athletic programs for their campuses in Brewton & Monroeville (North) and Bay Minette (South).

Institution	Location (Note: All locations are within the State of Alabama.)	Founded	Enrollment (Fall 2022)	Nickname	Joined
Bevill State Community College	Sumiton	1992	3,703	Bears	?
Bishop State Community College	Mobile	1927	2,968	Wildcats	?
Calhoun Community College	Tanner	1946	8,163	Warhawks	?
Central Alabama Community College	Alexander City	1989	1,777	Trojans	?
Chattahoochee Valley Community College	Phenix City	1973	1,641	Pirates	?
Coastal Alabama Community College – North	Brewton & Monroeville	1965	6,800 (Note: Enrollment at all campuses)	Coyotes	?
Coastal Alabama Community College – South	Bay Minette	1963	6,800	Coyotes	?
Enterprise State Community College	Enterprise	1965	2,010	Boll Weevils	?
Gadsden State Community College	Gadsden	1925	4,352	Cardinals	?
Jefferson State Community College	Center Point	1965	8,431	Pioneers	?
J.F. Drake State Community and Technical College	Huntsville	1961	1,011	TBA	2025
Lawson State Community College	Birmingham	1949	2,919	Cougars	?
Lurleen B. Wallace Community College	Andalusia	1969	1,929	Saints	?
Marion Military Institute	Marion	1842	320	Tigers	?
Northeast Alabama Community College	Rainsville	1963	2,590	Mustangs	?
Northwest Shoals Community College	Phil Campbell	1993	4,032	Patriots	?
Reid State Technical College	Evergreen	1963	434	Lions	2023
Shelton State Community College	Tuscaloosa	1994	4,166	Buccaneers	?
Snead State Community College	Boaz	1898	2,507	Parsons	?
Southern Union State Community College	Wadley	1993	4,386	Bison	?
Wallace Community College – Dothan	Dothan	1947	3,832	Governors	?
Wallace Community College – Selma	Selma	1963	1,860	Patriots	?
Wallace State Community College	Hanceville	1966	5,965	Lions	?

== Sports ==
- Baseball (Men)
- Basketball (Men & Women)
- Cross country (Men & Women)
- Golf (Men & Women)
- Softball (Women)
- Tennis (Men & Women)
- Volleyball (Women)

=== Sponsored sports by school ===
School	Men's Baseball	Men's Basketball	Men's Cross country	Men's Golf	Men's Tennis	Total Men's Sports	Women's Basketball	Women's Cross country	Women's Golf	Women's Softball	Women's Tennis	Women's Volleyball	Total Women's Sports	Total ACCC men's sports
Bevill St.	Yes D-II	Yes D-II	No	No	Yes	3	No	No	No	Yes D-II	Yes	Yes	3	6
Bishop St.	Yes D-II	Yes D-I	No	Yes	No	3	Yes D-I	No	No	Yes D-II	No	Yes	3	6
Calhoun	Yes D-I	Yes D-I	Yes	Yes	No	4	Yes D-I	Yes	Yes	Yes D-I	No	Yes	5	9
Central AL	Yes D-II	No	No	Yes	No	2	No	No	No	Yes D-II	Yes	No	2	4
Chattahoochee Valley	Yes D-I	Yes D-II	No	No	No	2	Yes D-II	No	No	Yes D-II	No	No	2	4
Coastal North	Yes D-II	Yes D-II	Yes	No	Yes	4	Yes D-II	Yes	No	Yes D-II	Yes	Yes	5	9
Coastal South	Yes D-I	Yes D-I	No	Yes	Yes	4	Yes D-I	No	No	Yes D-I	Yes	Yes	4	8
Enterprise St.	Yes D-II	Yes D-II	Yes	Yes	No	4	Yes D-II	Yes	No	Yes D-II	No	Yes	4	8
Gadsden St.	Yes D-I	Yes D-I	Yes	No	Yes	4	Yes D-I	Yes	No	No	No	Yes	3	7
Jefferson St.	No	No	Yes	Yes	No	2	No	Yes	No	No	No	No	1	3
Lawson St.	Yes D-I	Yes D-I	No	No	No	2	Yes D-I	Yes	No	No	No	Yes	3	5
Lurleen Wallace	Yes D-II	Yes D-II	Yes	Yes	No	4	Yes D-II	Yes	No	Yes D-II	No	Yes	4	8
Marion Military	Yes D-II	Yes D-II	Yes	No	Yes	4	No	Yes	No	Yes D-II	Yes	No	3	7
Northeast AL	No	No	Yes	Yes	No	2	No	Yes	Yes	No	No	No	2	4
Northwest Shoals	Yes D-I	No	Yes	No	No	2	No	Yes	No	Yes D-I	No	No	2	4
Reid St.	No	Yes D-II	No	No	No	1	No	No	No	No	No	No	0	1
Shelton St.	Yes D-I	Yes D-I	Yes	Yes	No	4	Yes D-I	Yes	No	Yes D-I	No	No	3	7
Snead St.	Yes D-I	Yes D-II	No	Yes	No	3	Yes D-II	No	No	Yes D-I	Yes	Yes	4	7
Southern Union	Yes D-I	Yes D-I	Yes	Yes	No	4	Yes D-I	Yes	Yes	Yes D-I	No	Yes	5	9
Wallace–Dothan	Yes D-II	No	No	No	No	1	No	No	No	Yes D-II	No	No	1	2
Wallace–Selma	Yes D-II	Yes D-II	No	No	No	2	Yes D-II	No	No	No	No	Yes	2	4
Wallace St.	Yes D-I	Yes D-I	Yes	Yes	Yes	5	Yes D-I	Yes	Yes	Yes D-I	Yes	Yes	6	11
Totals	19	17	12	12	6	66	14	13	4	16	7	14	68	134

Sports not sponsored by the ACCC which are played by ACCC schools:
School	Bass fishing	Cheerleading	eSports	Men's Soccer	Women's Soccer	Men's Track & Field	Women's Track & Field	Total non-ACCC sports
Calhoun	yes	–	yes	–	–	–	–	2
Coastal–North	–	yes	–	–	–	–	–	1
Coastal–South	–	yes	–	–	–	–	–	1
Enterprise St.	yes	–	–	–	–	–	–	1
Jefferson St.	–	–	yes	–	–	–	–	1
Lawson St.	–	yes	–	–	–	–	–	1
Marion Military	–	–	–	–	–	yes	yes	2
Northeast AL	–	–	yes	–	–	–	–	1
Reid St.	–	yes	yes	–	–	–	–	2
Shelton St.	yes	yes	yes	–	–	–	–	3
Southern Union	–	yes	–	yes	yes	–	–	3
Snead St.	–	yes	–	–	–	–	–	1
Wallace St.	–	yes	–	–	–	–	–	1
Totals	3	8	5	1	1	1	1	20

== See also ==
- List of NJCAA Division I schools
