= Sigma Kappa Delta =

American honor society for English

- ΣΚΔ
- Founded: April 21, 1996; 29 years ago Chicago, Illinois
- Type: Honor
- Affiliation: Sigma Tau Delta
- Status: Active
- Emphasis: English, 2-year colleges
- Scope: National
- Motto: "Sincerity, Knowledge, Design"
- Colors: Green and Gold
- Flower: English Ivy
- Publication: Hedera helix
- Chapters: 141
- Members: 2,500 active 23,000+ lifetime
- Headquarters: c/o Calhoun Community College; P.O Box 2216; Decatur, Alabama 35609; United States
- Website: www.english2.org

Sigma Kappa Delta (ΣΚΔ) is an American collegiate honor society for students of English at two-year colleges. It was established in 1996 in Chicago, Illinois. The society sponsors the National English Honor Society, a program for high school students of English.

== History ==
William Johnson, executive director of the collegiate English honor society Sigma Tau Delta and a professor of English at Northern Illinois University, convened a meeting of community college professors in Chicago on April 21, 1996, to discuss creating an English honor society for students of two-year colleges. The result was Sigma Kappa Delta. Its first president was Susan LeJeune, an associate professor of English at Louisiana State University at Eunice.

Sigma Kappa Delta encourages an interest in and recognizes academic excellence in English language and literature in undergraduate students at two-year colleges. The society also honors professional writers who have made contributions to the fields of language and literature. It supports literacy and creative and technical writing.

The first chapter was established at Northern Illinois University.

On April 20, 2008, a Sigma Kappa Delta chapter erected a monument at the burial site of 19th-century humorist George Washington Harris. In 2014, the society had 118 chapters and a total of 23,093 initiates.

As of 2024, Sigma Kappa Delta has chartered more than 140 chapters in the United States. Its national headquarters are located at Calhoun Community College in Decatur, Alabama.

== Symbols ==
The Greek letters Sigma Kappa Delta were selected to represent sincerity, knowledge, and design. The society's motto is "Sincerity, Knowledge, Design".

Sigma Kappa Delta adopted its seal and key in 1996. The society's colors are green and gold. Graduating members may wear green and gold honor cords. Its plant is the English ivy. Its publication has the scientific name for English ivy, Hedera helix.

== Activities ==
Sigma Kappa Delta publishes an annual literary journal, Hedera helix. Chapters sponsor various literacy activities, such as hosting a writing workshop, offering continuing education credits for teachers, or collecting supplies for elementary school students.

Sigma Kappa Delta sponsors the National English Honor Society, a program for high school students of English. The organization partners with Sigma Tau Delta to plan and promote an annual convention where members can present and attend educational sessions. It also presents scholarships and awards to its members.

== Membership ==
Sigma Kappa Delta inducts some 2,500 members annually. Eligible members have completed one academic semester and at least one course in English language or literature, with at least a 3.0 GPA in English and overall.

== Chapters ==
Following are the chapters of Sigma Kappa Delta, with active chapters indicated in bold and inactive chapters in italics.

Chapter	Charter date	Institution	Location	Status	Ref.
**Alpha**	1990	Cottey College	Nevada, Missouri	Active	
	1996	Northern Illinois University	DeKalb, Illinois	Inactive	
	November 13, 1996	Louisiana State University at Eunice	Baton Rouge, Louisiana	Inactive	
**Epsilon Alpha**	1996	Northeast Alabama Community College	Rainsville, Alabama	Active	
**Delta Alpha**	1997	Copiah–Lincoln Community College	Wesson, Mississippi	Active	
**Zeta Alpha**	1997	Navarro College	Corsicana, Texas	Active	
Theta Alpha		Owens Community College	Toledo, Ohio	Inactive	
Kappa Alpha	1997	Abraham Baldwin Agricultural College, Bainbridge	Bainbridge, Georgia	Inactive	
**Mu Alpha**	1997	Illinois Valley Community College	Oglesby, Illinois	Active	
**Nu Alpha**		Bladen Community College	Dublin, North Carolina	Active	
**Sigma Alpha**		Atlantic Cape Community College	Cape May Court House, New Jersey	Active	
**Tau Alpha**		Grayson College	Denison, Texas	Active	
**Upsilon Alpha**		Seminole State College	Seminole, Oklahoma	Active	
**Phi Alpha**		Bevill State Community College, Jasper Campus	Jasper, Alabama	Active	
**Beta Beta**		Spartanburg Methodist College	Spartanburg, South Carolina	Active	
**Epsilon Beta**		Del Mar College	Corpus Christi, Texas	Active	
**Eta Beta**		Columbia State Community College	Columbia, Tennessee	Active	
**Iota Beta**		Blinn College	Brenham, Texas	Active	
**Theta Beta**		Calhoun Community College	Decatur, Alabama	Active	
**Lambda Beta**		McLennan Community College	Waco, Texas	Active	
**Pi Beta**	2005	Wallace Community College	Dothan, Alabama	Active	
**Rho Beta**	2002	Fayetteville Technical Community College	Fayetteville, North Carolina	Active	
**Sigma Beta**	2002	Bishop State Community College	Mobile, Alabama	Active	
**Tau Beta**	2002	Central Texas College	Killeen, Texas	Active	
**Upsilon Beta**	2002	Laurel Ridge Community College	Warrenton, Virginia	Active	
**Phi Beta**		Amarillo College	Amarillo, Texas	Active	
**Chi Beta**		Lone Star College–Montgomery	Conroe, Texas	Active	
**Psi Beta**		Dallas College Eastfield	Mesquite, Texas	Active	
**Omega Beta**		Daytona State College	Daytona Beach, Florida	Active	
Beta Gamma		York Technical College	Rock Hill, South Carolina	Inactive	
**Gamma Gamma**		Northeast Texas Community College	Mount Pleasant, Texas	Active	
**Epsilon Gamma**		Luzerne County Community College	Nanticoke, Pennsylvania	Active	
Zeta Gamma		Delta College	University Center, Michigan	Inactive	
Theta Gamma		Blinn College, Bryan Campus	Bryan, Texas	Inactive	
**Lambda Gamma**		Northwest Arkansas Community College	Bentonville, Arkansas	Active	
**Xi Gamma**		Broward College, North Campus	Coconut Creek, Florida	Active	
Rho Gamma		State College of Florida, Manatee–Sarasota, Bradenton campus	Bradenton, Florida	Inactive	
**Sigma Gamma**		Baton Rouge Community College	Baton Rouge, Louisiana	Active	
**Tau Gamma**		Aims Community College, Greeley Campus	Greeley, Colorado	Active	
**Chi Gamma**	2007	Collin College, Preston Ridge Campus	Frisco, Texas	Active	
**Psi Gamma**		Tyler Junior College	Tyler, Texas	Active	
**Omega Gamma**	2007	Valley Forge Military College	Wayne, Pennsylvania	Active	
**Gamma Delta**	2007	University of Wisconsin–Whitewater at Rock County	Janesville, Wisconsin	Active	
**Delta Delta**	2007	Carteret Community College	Morehead City, North Carolina	Active	
**Epsilon Delta**		Jones College	Ellisville, Mississippi	Active	
**Theta Delta**	2007	Wallace State Community College	Hanceville, Alabama	Active	
**Kappa Delta**		Illinois Central College	East Peoria, Illinois	Active	
**Mu Delta**		Ashland Community and Technical College	Ashland, Kentucky	Active	
Pi Delta		Darton State College	Albany, Georgia	Inactive	(Note: Darton State College merged into Albany State University in 2016, under the Albany State name. The former Darton campus became the site of Albany State University's Darton College of Health Professions. Both schools offered, and Albany continues to offer, several 2-year Associate degrees along with 4-year Bachelor's degrees.)
Pi Delta		Albany State University	Albany, Georgia	Inactive	
**Tau Delta**		Lakeland Community College	Kirtland, Ohio	Active	
**Upsilon Delta**	2009	Kilgore College	Kilgore, Texas	Active	
**Phi Delta ?**		Suffolk County Community College, Ammerman Campus	Selden, New York	Active	
**Phi Delta ?**		Suffolk County Community College, Grant Campus	Brentwood, New York	Active	
**Chi Delta**		Plaza College	Forest Hills, New York	Active	
**Psi Delta**		Tarrant County College Trinity River Campus	Fort Worth, Texas	Active	
**Omega Delta**		Tarrant County College Southeast Campus	Arlington, Texas	Active	
**Alpha Epsilon**		Pearl River Community College, Forrest County Center	Hattiesburg, Mississippi	Active	
**Delta Epsilon**	May 2011	Black Hawk College	Moline, Illinois	Active	
**Epsilon Epsilon**		University of Arkansas – Pulaski Technical College	North Little Rock, Arkansas	Active	
**Zeta Epsilon**		Midland College	Midland, Texas	Active	
**Eta Epsilon**		Jefferson State Community College	Pell City, Alabama	Active	
**Theta Epsilon**		College of the Canyons	Santa Clarita, California	Active	
**Iota Epsilon**	2012	Snead State Community College	Boaz, Alabama	Active	
**Kappa Epsilon**	2012	River Parishes Community College	Gonzales, Louisiana	Active	
**Lambda Epsilon**	2012	Brookdale Community College	Lincroft, New Jersey	Active	
**Xi Epsilon**		South Texas College	McAllen, Texas	Active	
**Omicron Epsilon**		Hudson County Community College	Jersey City, New Jersey	Active	
**Pi Epsilon**		Broward College, Judson A. Samuels South Campus	Pembroke Pines, Florida	Active	
**Rho Epsilon**	2012	Louisburg College	Louisburg, North Carolina	Active	
**Sigma Epsilon**		Arkansas State University Mid-South	West Memphis, Arkansas	Active	
**Tau Epsilon**		Bevill State Community College, Sumiton Campus	Sumiton, Alabama	Active	
Upsilon Epsilon		Suffolk County Community College, Michael J. Grant Campus	Brentwood, New York	Inactive	
**Phi Epsilon**		Orange Coast College, Garrison Honors Center	Costa Mesa, California	Active	
**Chi Epsilon**		Southwest Tennessee Community College	Memphis, Tennessee	Active	
Omega Epsilon		Horry-Georgetown Technical College	Conway, South Carolina	Inactive	
**Alpha Zeta**		Arizona Western College	Yuma, Arizona	Active	
**Beta Zeta**		Eastern Arizona College	Thatcher, Arizona	Active	
**Gamma Zeta**		BridgeValley Community and Technical College	South Charleston, West Virginia	Active	
**Delta Zeta**		Woodland Community College	Woodland, California	Active	
**Epsilon Zeta**	2016	Volunteer State Community College	Gallatin, Tennessee	Active	
**Zeta Zeta**		Moraine Valley Community College	Palos Hills, Illinois	Active	
**Eta Zeta**	2017	Ventura College	Ventura, California	Active	
**Theta Zeta**	2017	Southern Union State Community College	Opelika, Alabama	Active	
**Iota Zeta**	2017	Santa Ana College	Santa Ana, California	Active	
**Kappa Zeta**	2017	State College of Florida, Manatee–Sarasota, Venice campus	Venice, Florida	Active	
**Lambda Zeta**	2017	Miami Dade College, North Campus	Miami, Florida	Active	
**Lambda Zeta**	2017	Miami Dade College, Kendall Campus	Miami, Florida	Active	
**Mu Zeta**	2017	Pasco–Hernando State College	Wesley Chapel, Florida	Active	
**Nu Zeta**		Temple College	Temple, Texas	Active	
**Omicron Zeta**		Itawamba Community College	Fulton, Mississippi	Active	
**Pi Zeta**		Cerritos College	Norwalk, California	Active	
**Rho Zeta**	2018	Mid-Plains Community College, North Platte–North Campus	North Platte, Nebraska	Active	(Note: Chapter formed at North Platte Community College, now Mid-Plains Community College, North Platte-North.)
**Sigma Zeta**	April 2019	Muskegon Community College	Muskegon, Michigan	Active	
**Phi Zeta**		Andrew College	Cuthbert, Georgia	Active	
**Beta Eta**		Fullerton College	Fullerton, California	Active	
**Gamma Eta**		Miami Dade College, Eduardo J. Padrón Campus	Miami, Florida	Active	
	2022	American Samoa Community College	Pago Pago, American Samoa	Active	
		Austin Community College	Austin, Texas	Active	
		Bevill State Community College, Fayette Campus	Fayette, Alabama	Active	
		Bossier Parish Community College	Bossier City, Louisiana	Active	
		Central Alabama Community College	Alexander City, Alabama	Active	
		Coastline College	Fountain Valley, California	Active	
		Dallas College North Lake	Irving, Texas	Active	
		East Mississippi Community College	Scooba, Mississippi	Active	
		El Paso Community College	El Paso, Texas	Active	
		Harold Washington College	Chicago, Illinois	Active	
		Howard College	Big Spring, Texas	Active	
		Lamar State College–Port Arthur	Port Arthur, Texas	Active	
		Maysville Community and Technical College	Maysville, Kentucky	Active	
		Miami Dade College, Homestead Campus	Homestead, Florida	Active	
		Mississippi Gulf Coast Community College, Harrison County Campus	Gulfport, Mississippi	Active	
		Mott Community College	Flint, Michigan	Active	
		Northwest–Shoals Community College	Phil Campbell, Alabama	Active	
		Ocean County College	Toms River, New Jersey	Active	
		Odessa College	Odessa, Texas	Active	
		Oxnard College	Oxnard, California	Active	
		Raritan Valley Community College	Somerville, New Jersey	Active	
		Southern West Virginia Community and Technical College	Logan, West Virginia	Active	
	2007	Tarrant County College Northwest Campus	Fort Worth, Texas	Active	
		Tarrant County College South Campus	Fort Worth, Texas	Active	
	2022	Wake Technical Community College	Raleigh, North Carolina	Active	
		Union College, Cranford Campus	Cranford, New Jersey	Active	

== See also ==
- Honor society
