= Wallace Community College (disambiguation) =

Wallace Community College (formally George C. Wallace State Community College) is a public community college in Dothan, Alabama.

Wallace Community College may also refer to:

- Wallace Community College Selma (formally George Corley Wallace State Community College), in Selma, Alabama
- Lurleen B. Wallace Community College, with campuses in several Alabama cities
- Wallace State Community College, in Hanceville
