= Adrian Pledger =

American basketball player

Personal information
- Born: May 3, 1976 (age 50)
- Listed height: 6 ft 3 in (1.91 m)

Career information
- College: Wallace State Community College; West Virginia University
- Position: Guard and forward

Career highlights
- Top Scorer in the 2000-01 Israel Basketball Premier League

Adrian Pledger (born May 3, 1976) is a former American professional basketball player. Pledger played guard and forward for Ironi Nahariya in the Israeli Basketball Premier League. He was the top scorer in the 2000-01 Israel Basketball Premier League

== Biography ==
Pledger's hometown is Camden, Alabama. He is 6 ft 3 in (1.91 metres) tall.

He first played college basketball at Wallace State Community College in Alabama from 1995 to 1996. In 1996 Pledger was a second-team JUCO all-American after he averaged 25 points, 14 rebounds, 5 steals, and 3 blocks a game. With Wallace State, he was the 1996 Alabama Sports Writers Association Community College Athlete of the Year.

Pledger then played basketball for West Virginia University for the Mountaineers, was a guard and captain of the basketball team in 1997–98, and graduated in 1998. His two-point .560 field goal percentage in 1996-97 was fifth in the Big East Conference. In his two seasons of play, he averaged 13.1 points per game, with a 51.1% field goal percentage.

Pledger played guard and forward for Ironi Nahariya in the Israeli Basketball Premier League in Israel. He was the top scorer in the 2000-01 Israel Basketball Premier League.
