= Sumiton Christian School =

Coordinates: 33.746870°N 87.048991°W

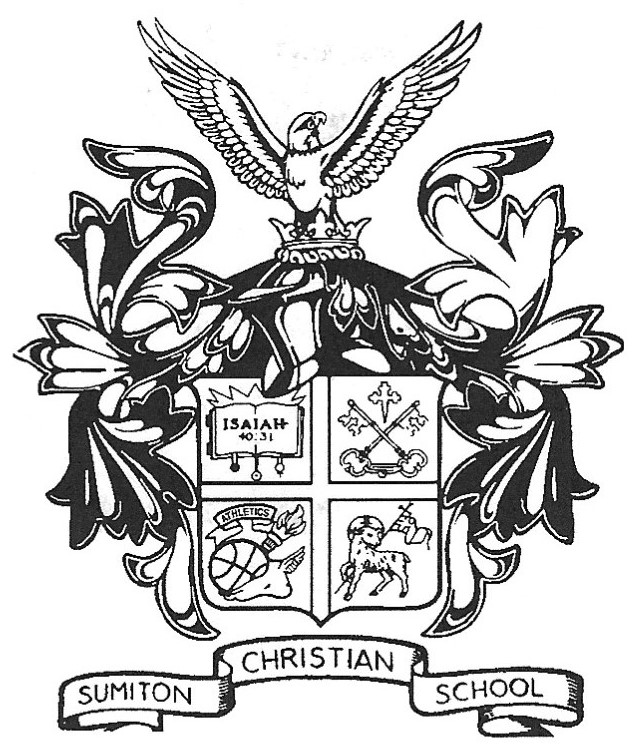
- Sumiton Christian School Crest

Location
- 155 Hosanna Dr; Sumiton, Alabama 35148; United States

Information
- Type: Private
- Motto: They Shall Mount Up With Wings As Eagles - Isaiah 40:31
- Established: 1976 (50 years ago)
- CEEB code: 012547
- Principal: Cheryl Capps
- Faculty: 32
- Grades: Pre-K-12th grade
- Enrollment: 355
- Colors: Cardinal and gold
- Athletics: Football, Basketball, Cheerleading, Wrestling, Track, Cross Country, Volleyball, Baseball, Softball, Golf, Tennis, and
- Mascot: Eagle
- Website: www.sumitonchristian.org

Sumiton Christian School is a private K-12 Christian school located in Sumiton, Alabama. Sumiton Christian is a member of the Alabama Independent School Association (AISA) and competes in high school athletics with the Alabama High School Athletic Association (AHSAA). The school's colors are cardinal and gold and their mascot is Thunder (an eagle).

== History ==
Sumiton Christian was founded in 1976 as a kindergarten called Kiddie College. Classes were held in the Sumiton Church of God Sunday school rooms. In 1983 the school became known as Pathway Christian School and was offering classes up to the 6th grade. In 1989 the name was officially changed to Sumiton Christian School. SCS experienced its most rapid growth from 1990 - 1996 when enrollment jumped from 175 to over 500 students. In 1995 SCS had its first graduating class made up of 16 students. Currently, SCS has more than 625 students enrolled.

In 1975 Jack-N-Jill Kindergarten destroyed by fire. Glenda Dodd turned over her enrollment to the Sumiton Church of God. Monies from the insurance company used to purchase all school supplies. Name changed to Kiddie College; 42 students enrolled with three teachers for K-4 and K-5 students

In 1976 the school started as "Kiddie College". Classes held in Sumiton Church of God Sunday school rooms.

In 1983 the name was changed to Pathway Christian School. Classes included elementary grades up to 6th grade students

In 1986 the school moved to present location - Building #1 and added grades 7th & 8th.

1989

Building #1 Dedication ceremony
Official name of school changed to Sumiton Christian School
Becky Potts - new principal; enrollment is 120 students K - 8th.
Nine Full-time teachers employed; two staff employed

1992

Building #2 constructed in summer of 1992
Enrollment climbs to 250 students K-10.
Nineteen full-time teachers and four staff members.

1994

Enrollment climbs to 450
New wing constructed on Building #2

1995

First Graduating class of SCS - 16 students

1996

Enrollment reaches 543
Second graduating class with 21 students
Football/baseball complex constructed and field house completed
AISA Class 1A Basketball State Champions

1998

AISA Class 3A basketball state runner-Up

2000

SACS Accreditation completed
Excavation for new High School complex started

2001

First phase of construction completed
Cafeteria and new high school wing entered for first time

2002

New gymnasium, locker rooms and weight room completed
First varsity basketball games played in new facility

2004

AL High School Athletic Association Class 2A State Baseball Champions
Formation of Beginning Band, Concert Band and Symphonic Band
Newly-formed SCS Eagle Vanguard Marching Band marches for the first time

== Athletics ==
The Eagles compete in the AHSAA class 2A sports. SCS has eight female varsity sports, including basketball, cheerleading, cross-country, golf, softball, swimming, track, and volleyball. The Eagles also have 8 male varsity sports, including football, basketball, baseball, golf, wrestling, swimming, tennis, and cross-country.

The varsity basketball team won the AISA Class 1A Basketball State Championship in 1996. That feat was almost duplicated in 1998 while competing in the highest AISA classification level. They finished that season as the AISA Class 3A Basketball State Runner-Up.

The first year the school competed in the Alabama High School Athletic Association, 2000-2001, Football made it to the second round of playoffs, and Varsity Cheer won State Cheerleading Championship in Class 1A.

The varsity baseball team won the AHSAA class 2A state baseball championship in 2004.

The varsity fast-pitch softball team completed a perfect season in 2010, sweeping the Walker County Tournament and AHSAA Area and Regional Title match-ups. The season ended with yet another sweep, taking the 2010 Girls 3A State Championship Title.

The Marching Band received 1's in Band and Percussion for the first time in school history in 2022.
