= J.F. Drake State Community and Technical College =

College in Huntsville, Alabama, U.S.

- Type: Public, historically black community and technical college
- Established: 1961
- Affiliations: Alabama Community College System
- President: Dr. Patricia Sims
- Total staff: 61
- Undergraduates: 976
- Location: Huntsville, Alabama, USA; 34°46′19″N 86°34′26″W
- Campus: Urban, 32 acres (.13 km²)
- Colors: Blue and White
- Nickname: Drake State
- Sporting affiliations: NJCAA – ACCC
- Mascot: Blue Eagle
- Website: drakestate.edu

J.F. Drake State Community and Technical College (Drake State) is a public, historically black community and technical college in Huntsville, Alabama. The college was founded as Huntsville State Vocational Technical College in 1961. Drake State is accredited by the Southern Association of Colleges and Schools and offers associate degrees, certificates and non-credit courses through its 16 programs.

In 2021, Drake State was announced as one of six institutions to receive NASA’s Inclusion Across the Nation of Communities of Learners of Underrepresented Discoverers in Engineering and Science Award. In partnership with NASA's Minority University Research and Education Project, the college received approximately $1.2 million to expand its Frontiers Research Program for STEM workforce development and offer free STEM programs to local middle and high school students.

== History ==
Drake State was founded in 1961 as the Huntsville State Vocational Technical College by the Alabama State Board of Education, and initially offered courses to African-American students. Classes commenced in September 1962 with 27 students enrolled in three programs: brick masonry, cosmetology and auto mechanics. The school comprised one building that sat on 32 acres (0.13 km^{2}) of land deeded by Alabama A&M University.

In 1966, the school was renamed J. F. Drake State Technical Trade School in honor of Joseph Fanning Drake, a long-serving president of Alabama A&M University.

In 1967, the school became the first desegregated postsecondary technical school in the United States.

In 1973, it was designated a technical college by the state board of education, and adopted the name J.F. Drake State Technical College.

In 2012, Drake State attained full accreditation, which was required to establish transfer agreements with four-year institutions in Alabama. The agreements would allow students to transfer their Drake State credits to a four-year institution after earning an associate degree at Drake State.

In 2013, the school was renamed J.F. Drake State Community and Technical College with state approval. Drake State is the first and only higher education institution in Alabama to receive this naming convention, which allows the college to operate as both a traditional two-year community college, while retaining its technical trade programs.

=== Presidents ===
- S.C. O'Neal, 1962–1983
- Johnny L. Harris, 1983–2000
- Helen McAlpine, 2000–November 2015 (Note: McAlpine resigned after being placed on administrative leave in November 2015 pending an investigation into the allocation of grant funding under her administration.)
- Kemba Chambers, November 2015–May 2016, interim: April 2016–May 2017
- Christopher A. Lewis, interim: June 2017–July 2018
- Cynthia Anthony, interim: August 2018–November 2018
- Dr. Patricia Sims: November 2018 - Current

== Campus ==
The main campus of J.F. Drake State consists of the following:

- Building 100 (Completed ca. 1981): Building 100 acts as the permanent home of the college's various nursing programs.
- Building 200 (Completed ca. 1981, Renovated 2009): Building 200 is home to the Electrical Engineering, Industrial Systems, and Machine Tool Technology Programs. It also houses the Office of Career Coaching as well as a Veteran's Services office and veteran student lounge.
- Building 300 (Completed ca. 1964): Building 300 is home to the Culinary Arts Program, The Cafetorium (a multipurpose event facility), and the Blue Eagle Cafe. Building 300 is significant due to its striking mid-century modern architecture. The building has been well-maintained over the years and is one of the most distinctive structures on campus.
- Building 400 (Completed ca. 1964): Building 400 is home to the Welding and Automotive Service Technology Programs as well as the Facilities Operations Office.
- Building 500 (Completed ca. 1964): Building 500 is home to the Accounting, Computer Information Systems, and Medical Assisting Technology Programs as well as the Business Office, I.T. Services Department, and the Human Resources Office. The building is known for its expansive corridor that runs the complete length of the structure North to South. Students often use the building as a convenient thoroughfare to traverse the campus.
- Powers Center / Building 600 (Completed ca. 1961, Renovated 2011): The "Original Drake Campus" houses the Cosmetology Program, the Student Center, and the Campus Security Office. The cosmetology portion of the building (known as Powers Center) is named in honor of Norma L. Powers. Powers was a pioneer in the development of the current Salon Management and Barbering Technology programs at J.F. Drake State. Powers Center is a cosmetology, barbering, and salon management training facility which encompasses approximately 80% of the building.
- Building 700 (Completed ca. 1968): Building 700 houses General Studies as well as the Admissions Office, Career Services Office, Testing Center, TRIO Program Office, and the Counseling Services Office.
- Building 800 (Completed ca. 1968): Building 800 is home to the Adult Education, Engineering Graphics, and Heating and Air Conditioning Technology Programs.
- S.C. O'Neal Library and Technology Center (Completed ca. 2006): The LTC is the forwardmost building on campus and it acts as the pillar of the campus. The LTC houses general studies classrooms, two computer labs, and a two-story library center. The third floor houses executive functions as well as the Office of the President and the Office of the Dean.
- Renewable Energy Laboratory (Completed ca. 2012): This lab acts as a training lab for the installation of geothermal heating and cooling units. It is completely off-grid and houses a 60-gallon solar thermal water heater and 12 solar panels. It also has a charging station for electric vehicles, with electricity provided completely via solar power.

All of the original core buildings of the campus remain to this day and consist mostly of mid-century modern single level architecture. Many buildings have been heavily renovated to meet current technology needs, but some still contain their completely original fittings and layouts. The campus is landscaped and has been awarded Huntsville's Beautification Award on several occasions.

== Administration and organization ==
Drake State operates under five divisions: Advanced Manufacturing Technologies; Applied Services Technologies; Business, Computer Science and Engineering Technologies; General and Developmental Education; and Health Sciences Technologies.

A typical academic year is broken up into two 16-week terms during the fall (August–December) and spring (January–May). Within each full term are two accelerated sessions that last approximately seven weeks each. The full summer term is 10 weeks long (May–August). Within the term are two accelerated sessions that each last approximately five weeks. An academic year begins on the first day of the fall term and ends on the last day of the summer term.

== Academics ==
Drake State has an open admissions policy and accepts life experience as credits. The college offers early entry and dual enrollment programs to local high school students. In addition to its associate and certificate degree programs, Drake State offers adult education/GED courses. The college also offers a continuing education and adult skills training program as well as a training for existing business and industry program through the Alabama Department of Economic and Community Affairs Workforce Development division.

Drake State has transfer agreements with every public four-year institution in Alabama. The agreements allow students to automatically transfer after completing an associate degree at Drake State.

== Student Life ==
=== Student body ===
As of fall 2020, Drake State's student body consists of 825 students. There are 31 percent full-time and 69 percent part-time students.

Demographics of student body in fall 2020
	Full and Part Time Students	U.S. Census (Note: People who identify as Hispanic/Latino are included in applicable race categories.)
International	2%	N/A
Multiracial American	5%	2.8%
Black/African American	62%	13.4%
American Indian and Alaska Native	1%	1.3%
Asian	1%	5.9%
Non-Hispanic White American	23%	60.1%
Hispanic/Latino American	5%	18.5%
Native Hawaiian and Other Pacific Islander	0%	0.2%
Other/Unknown	2%	N/A

=== Organizations ===
Several student clubs and organizations operate at Drake State, including honors societies and student government, special interest and service organizations.

Campus groups include: Cyber Security Club; Entrepreneurship Club; International Association of Administrative Professionals; Medical Assisting Technology Club; Phi Beta Lambda; Phi Theta Kappa; S.C. O’Neal, Sr. Library and Technology Center Book Club; SkillsUSA and Student Ambassador's Program.

Drake State holds an annual "Mr. and Ms. Drake State" pageant to honor a select group of students who represent the school and embody the school's spirit. Drake State also holds an annual car show, sponsored by its automotive program.
