= Alabama College of Osteopathic Medicine =

Osteopathic medical school in Dothan, Alabama, U.S.

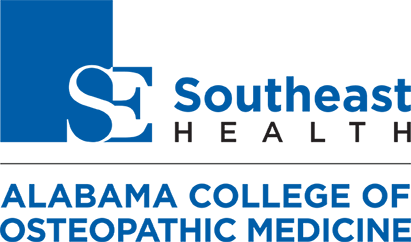
- Other name: ACOM
- Type: Private medical school
- Established: 2010
- Affiliations: Southeast Health, Alabama Medical Education Consortium
- Budget: $12.26 million
- Chairman: John McDaniel
- President: Richard O. Sutton, III
- Dean: James C. Jones
- Students: 644
- Location: Dothan, Alabama, US; 31.2149°N 85.3616°W
- Campus: 200 acres
- Website: www.acom.edu

The Alabama College of Osteopathic Medicine (ACOM) is a private medical school in Dothan, Alabama. It is the first osteopathic medical school in the state and is believed to be the first osteopathic medical school in the nation established by a regional not-for-profit hospital.

It is accredited by the American Osteopathic Association's Commission on Osteopathic College Accreditation (COCA). Graduates of the college receive a Doctor of Osteopathic Medicine degree (D.O.). The first class graduated in 2017.

== History ==
Alabama College of Osteopathic Medicine opened for courses in 2013. It was the third medical school in Alabama. In 2017, ACOM hosted its first community health fair. In May 2019, a walking trail opened near campus, connecting the medical school with local retail developments. In September 2019, ACOM established an internal medicine and pediatrics clinic in Ashford, Alabama.

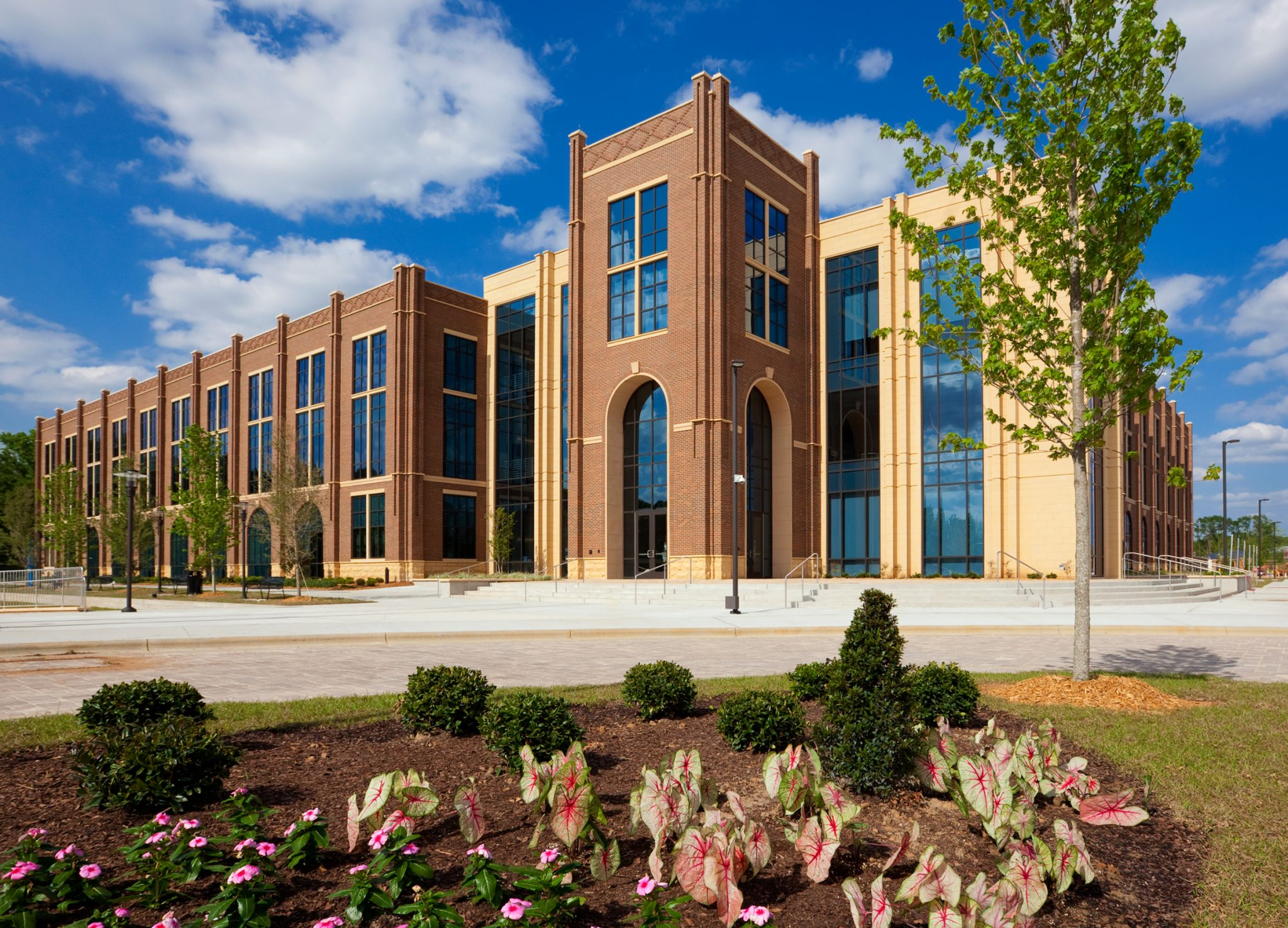
Front view of ACOM's campus.

== Academics ==
Like many other medical schools in the United States, ACOM students will take basic science classes in the first two years of medical school, and move on to clinical clerkships during their third and fourth years. Twenty students per year complete rotations at Jackson Hospital in Montgomery. Students rotate throughout Northern Florida in Pensacola, Tallahassee, and Panama City. The school is currently aiding in the establishment of residency programs in the state of Alabama.

The medical school offers two dual degrees: a Master of Science in management (MSM) Program and a Masters in Business Administration. Both are offered via Troy University at Dothan. A team of second-year students from the Alabama College of Osteopathic Medicine (ACOM) won the International SimChallenge in Paris, France at the Society in Europe for the Simulation Applied to Medicine (SESAM) annual meeting held June 14–16, 2017.

== See also ==
- List of medical schools in the United States
