= H. Councill Trenholm State Community College =

Community college in Montgomery, Alabama, U.S.

- Former names: John M. Patterson Technical School; John M. Patterson Technical College; H. Councill Trenholm State Technical College
- Type: Public historically black community college
- Established: 1963; 63 years ago
- Affiliations: Alabama Community College System
- President: Dr. Kemba Chambers
- Students: 1,846 (all undergraduate)
- Location: Montgomery, Alabama, USA; Trenholm Campus: 32°21′1″N 86°20′35″W; Patterson Campus: 32°19′29″N 86°14′31″W
- Campus: Trenholm Campus: 35 acres (0.14 km^{2}) Patterson Campus: 43 acres (0.17 km^{2})
- Website: trenholmstate.edu

H. Councill Trenholm State Community College (Trenholm State, Trenholm, TSCC) is a public, historically black community college in Montgomery, Alabama. The college was founded as a merger between John M. Patterson Technical College (1961) and H. Councill Trenholm State Technical College (1963) in Montgomery. Trenholm State is accredited by the Southern Association of Colleges and Schools Commission on Colleges, and offers associate degrees, certificates and non-credit courses thorough more than 20 programs.

== History ==
The technical division of Trenholm State was founded as John M. Patterson Technical School in Montgomery, Alabama, in 1961, after the 1947 Regional Vocational and Trade School Act 673 permitted its establishment. Named after then-Governor John M. Patterson, the school was constructed on 43 acres (0.17 km^{2}) of land purchased by the Montgomery County Board of Revenue and the City of Montgomery. Accredited by the Council on Occupational Education, the $1 million school was opened at 3920 Troy Highway in 1962, and offered trade courses to white students. The Alabama State Board of Education renamed the school John M. Patterson Technical College in 1974.

In 1963, the passage of a three-bill act under then-Governor George Wallace transferred control of two-year schools from the state of Alabama to the governor. The legislation allowed the expansion of trade schools and junior colleges throughout the state. The legislation also permitted the Alabama Trade School and Junior College Authority and the Alabama State Board of Education to allocate $1.5 million to the construction of each new school.

As a result of the 1963 act, H. Councill Trenholm State Technical College was founded nearly nine miles from John M. Patterson Technical School in 1965. Named after former president of Alabama State University Dr. Harper Councill Trenholm, the college was constructed on 35 acres (0.14 km^{2}) of land at 1225 Air Base Boulevard. Also accredited by the Council on Occupational Education, the $1.25 million college was completed in 1966, and offered trade courses to black students.

In 2000, the Alabama State Board of Education approved the merger of John M. Patterson Technical College and H. Councill Trenholm State Technical College as a part of a statewide effort to remove duplicate community college programs. The proposed merger was met with debate, because the colleges had been culturally shaped by the social tensions of American segregation and integration since their beginnings. There was also debate over the designated name and main campus of the merged colleges. In 2001, the colleges were consolidated as H. Councill Trenholm State Technical College to maintain the Title III-B funding eligibility that the historically black college held before the merger. Trenholm Campus, 1225 Air Base Boulevard, was subsequently designated as the main campus, and Patterson Campus, 3920 Troy Highway, was designated as the additional campus. In 2002, H. Councill Trenholm State Technical College was accredited by the Council on Occupational Education.

H. Councill Trenholm State Technical College was accredited by Southern Association of Colleges and Schools Commission on Colleges in 2014 and renamed H. Councill Trenholm State Community College in 2015.

== Administration and organization ==
Trenholm operates under four divisions: Academic, Allied Health, Career/Technical Education and Workforce Development.

A typical academic year contains two 15-week terms during the fall (August–December) and spring (January–May). Within the terms are two seven-week accelerated sessions, or mini terms. The full summer term is 10 weeks long (May–August). An academic year begins on the first day of the fall term and ends on the last day of the summer term.

== Academics and programs ==
Trenholm has an open admissions policy and offers credits for life experience. The college also offers dual enrollment programs to local high school students, as well as a government-funded college preparatory program for low-income and prospective first-generation college students attending high school in the tri-county area. In addition to its associate and certificate degree programs, Trenholm offers adult education, workforce education, professional development and personal enrichment training through its Workforce Development and Continuing Education divisions.

Trenholm has transfer agreements with four-year institutions in Alabama. The agreements allow students to automatically transfer after completing an associate degree at Trenholm.

== Student life ==
As of fall 2020, Trenholm's student body consists of 1,526 students. There are 42 percent full time and 58 percent part-time students.

Demographics of student body in fall 2020
	Full and Part Time Students	U.S. Census (Note: People who identify as Hispanic/Latino are included in applicable race categories.)
International	0%	N/A
Multiracial American	1%	2.8%
Black/African American	68%	13.4%
American Indian and Alaska Native	0%	1.3%
Asian	1%	5.9%
Non-Hispanic White American	23%	60.1%
Hispanic/Latino American	3%	18.5%
Native Hawaiian and Other Pacific Islander	0%	0.2%
Other/Unknown	3%	N/A

=== Organizations ===
Several student clubs and organizations operate at Trenholm, including student government and service organizations.

Trenholm holds "Miss Trenholm State Community College", an annual beauty pageant that honors a select group of current, high-achieving female students.

== Presidents ==
- Thad McClammy, 1981–1995
- Dr. Alma Freeman (interim: April 2001–November 2001)
- Dr. Anthony L. Molina, November 2001 – 2007
- Sam Munnerlyn, (2007–2019)
- Anita Archie (interim: January 2020–May 2021)
- Dr. Kemba Chambers, May 2021–present

== See also ==
- List of historically black colleges and universities
