= J. F. Ingram State Technical College =

Community college in Deatsville, Alabama, US

- Type: Community college
- Established: 1965
- Academic staff: 34
- Students: 543
- Location: Deatsville, Alabama, USA; 32.581987°N 86.392°W
- Colours: o
- Website: istc.edu

J. F. Ingram State Technical College (ISTC) is a community college in Deatsville, Alabama. As of the Fall 2010 semester, ISTC has an enrollment of 543 students, all of whom are incarcerated adults. The college was founded in 1965 and was named for John Fred Ingram, director of Alabama's vocational education program from 1957 until 1969.
