= Shelton State Community College =

Public college in Tuscaloosa, Alabama, United States

Coordinates: 33.12052°N 87.56148°W

- Type: Public community college
- Established: 1952 (earliest predecessor); 1994 (consolidated)
- President: Jonathan Koh
- Academic staff: 99 full-time and 99 part-time (spring 2022)
- Administrative staff: 168
- Students: 4,659 (spring 2022)
- Location: Tuscaloosa, Alabama, United States
- Campus: Martin campus - suburban C.A. Fredd campus - urban
- Colors: Green and Emerald
- Nickname: Buccaneers
- Sporting affiliations: ACCC, NJCAA
- Website: www.sheltonstate.edu

Shelton State Community College is a public community college in Tuscaloosa, Alabama. Operated by the Alabama State Department of Postsecondary Education, Shelton is one of the largest two-year colleges in the state. Approximately 4,500 students are enrolled in some form of coursework, including around 3,000 full-time students. The college is accredited by the Southern Association of Colleges and Schools.

Shelton State is also designated as the Alabama Junior College of the Fine Arts by the state legislature. The Alabama Stage and Screen Hall of Fame is located there and Theatre Tuscaloosa is based in the Bean Browne Theatre at Shelton. The Alabama Fire College and Personnel Standards Commission is also located on the Martin campus of Shelton State. The Fire College is responsible for training paid and volunteer fire fighters and EMTs throughout the state.

== History ==
The Tuscaloosa Trade School was created by the Alabama State Board of Education in 1950 and opened for classes in 1952. Its campus was located southeast of downtown, near what is now the intersection of 15th Street/Veterans Memorial Drive and McFarland Boulevard. In 1954, the school was renamed J. P. Shelton Trade School in honor of one of the state legislature who lobbied for the opening of the trade school in Tuscaloosa. In 1976, the school's name was changed to Shelton State Technical College.

In 1975, Brewer State Junior College (now Bevill State Community College) opened a branch campus in Tuscaloosa in an old elementary school building near the intersection of 28th Street and Greensboro Avenue. At the time of its opening, it had three full-time faculty and 800 students. In 1977, Brewer State moved to a renovated strip mall on Skyland Boulevard.

Shelton State Community College was established on January 1, 1979, by the state Board of Education by combining Shelton State and the Tuscaloosa branch of Brewer State. The two campuses remained separate, with the 15th Street campus acting as the vocational and technical campus and the Skyland Boulevard campus serving as the junior college campus.

Tuscaloosa State Trade School was created by the state legislature in 1963. In 1974, the institution became Tuscaloosa State Technical College and was authorized by the Alabama State Board of Education to grant associate degrees. In 1976, the college name was changed to C. A. Fredd State Technical College to honor the first president of the institution.

In 1994, Fredd State merged with Shelton State. The new institution retained the name of Shelton State Community College, and the president of Shelton State was named president of the consolidated institution. Around this time, Shelton broke ground on a new campus on Alabama Highway 69 in the growing suburb of Taylorville. The new campus - named Martin campus - opened in 1997-98 and consolidated the 15th Street and Skyland Boulevard campuses into one. The Fredd campus remained on MLK Boulevard but was renovated extensively to match the architecture of the Martin campus.

== Campus ==
Shelton State has two campuses: Martin Campus, off Alabama Highway 69, south of Tuscaloosa, in the unincorporated suburb of Taylorville, and C.A. Fredd Campus on Martin Luther King Jr., Boulevard in west Tuscaloosa.

== Athletics ==
Shelton State fields six varsity sports teams in the Alabama Community College Conference (ACCC) in Division I of the National Junior College Athletic Association (NJCAA). Two of the sports are women's (softball and basketball), two are men's (baseball and basketball), and one is co-ed (cheerleading).

Shelton State's sports teams are called the Buccaneers and their colors are gold and emerald.

== Notable alumni ==
- Ron Bolton, member of the Alabama House of Representatives
- Russ Davis, former Major League Baseball third baseman

== Notable faculty ==
- Ralph Anthony Howard, member of the Alabama House of Representatives
