= Calhoun Community College =

Community college in Decatur, Alabama, US

John C. Calhoun Community College
- Type: Community college
- Established: 1946
- Endowment: $9.06M (2021)
- President: Jimmy Hodges
- Students: 8,480
- Location: Decatur and Huntsville, Alabama; 34.648°N 86.948°W
- Campus: 110 acres (45 ha)
- Mascot: Warhawks
- Website: http://www.calhoun.edu/

Calhoun Community College is a public community college in Decatur, Alabama. It is the largest of the 24 two-year institutions that make up the Alabama Community College System.

== History ==
The college was founded in 1946 and named after John C. Calhoun, the 7th Vice President of the United States. He was a War Hawk of 1812, hence the Calhoun athletic teams names.

=== Huntsville Campus ===
The Huntsville Campus opened in 2006. The Sparkman Building was originally a Chrysler electronics factory. The building was purchased by Calhoun Community College for $4.5 million, which included $2 million for a 5-year cleanup of the site.

Construction of the Math, Science, and CIS building began in 2014, and was opened in 2016.

== Campus ==
In addition to its main 110-acre (45 ha) campus in Tanner, the college has sites at Huntsville/Cummings Research Park, the Alabama Center for the Arts in downtown Decatur, and at the Limestone Correctional Facility. The campus sits adjacent to Pryor Field Regional Airport along Highway 31. Calhoun also previously operated a site at The Mall in Huntsville up until it was demolished at the turn of the century. The section of the mall it was in is now a Home Depot.

== Academics ==
Calhoun serves just over 8,000 students. It offers 49 associate degree programs and 52 career and certificate programs. Of Calhoun's 302 full-time employees, 133 serve on the college faculty. Over 80% of the full-time faculty possess at least a master's degree and approximately 15 percent hold a doctorate.

== Student life ==
The Decatur campus serves as home for the Warhawks athletic teams. Both baseball fields, and the Carlton Kelly Gymnasium, are housed on the campus. Calhoun participates in baseball and softball in the Alabama Community College Conference.

Due to the small size of both Decatur and Austin High School's gymnasiums, the rivalry basketball game is held each year at the 3,000-seat Carlton Kelly Gymnasium to accommodate the large crowds. However, this gym is still not the correct size for the event as crowds up to 4,000 in size attempt to attend the event and upwards of 1,000 can be turned away at each rivalry game.

== Notable alumni ==
- Bo Bice, American Idol runner-up, graduated May 1997
- John D. Douglas, basketball player (Los Angeles Clippers), coach, graduated 1976
- Micky Hammon, Republican member and Majority Leader of the Alabama House of Representatives since 2002.
- Jorge Posada, catcher, New York Yankees, graduated 1991
- Gary Redus, Major League Baseball player, graduated 1977

== See also ==
- List of colleges and universities in Alabama
