= Gadsden State Community College =

Public community colleges in North-East Alabama, US

- Type: Public historically black community college
- Established: 1925; 101 years ago
- Parent institution: Alabama Community College System
- Endowment: $3.14 million
- Chancellor: Jimmy H. Baker
- President: Kathy L. Murphy
- Students: 3,993
- Location: Gadsden, Anniston, & Centre, Alabama, United States; 33.9945°N 85.9920°W
- Campus: East Broad Street Valley Street Wallace Drive Gadsden State Cherokee Ayers
- Colors: Red, black and silver
- Nickname: Cardinals
- Sporting affiliations: NJCAA; ACCC
- Mascot: Swoop the Cardinal
- Website: gadsdenstate.edu
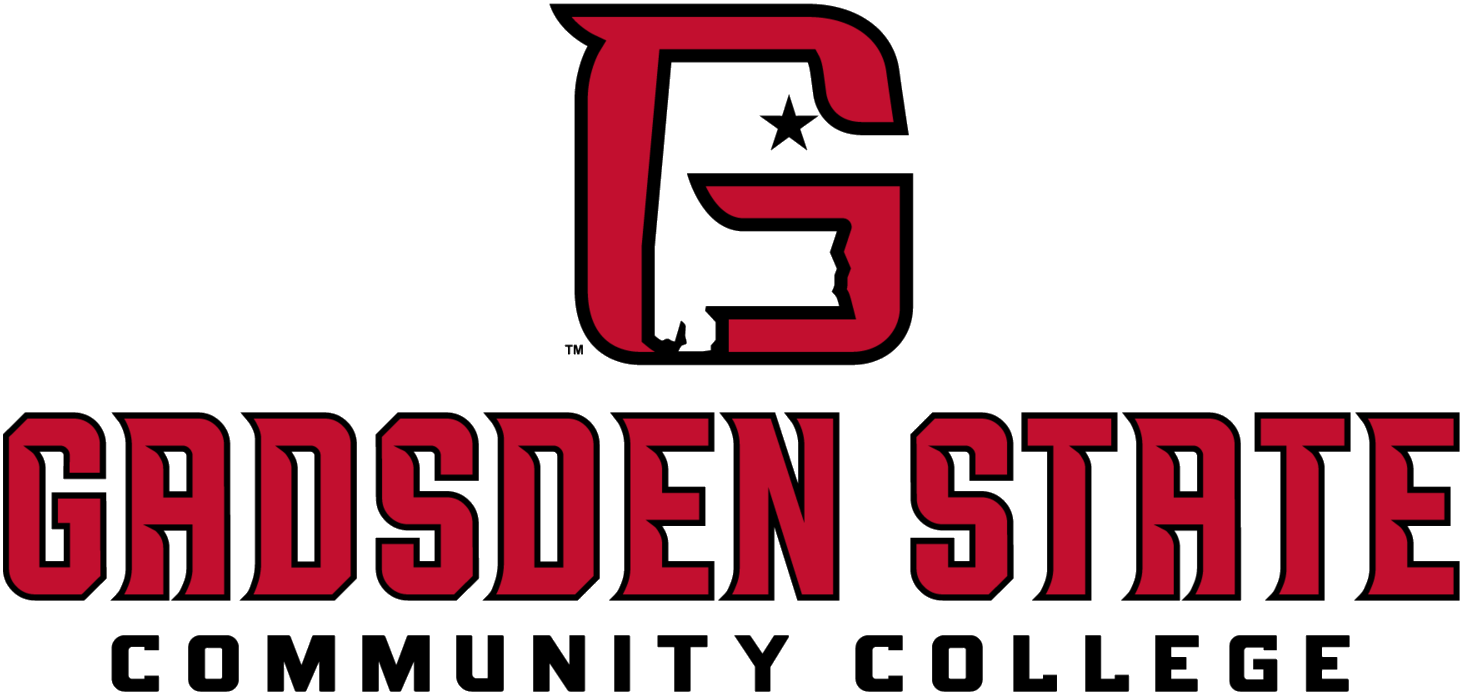

Gadsden State Community College (Gadsden State, Gadsden, or GSCC) is a public community college with campuses in Gadsden, Centre and Anniston, Alabama. The college was founded as a merger between Alabama Technical College (1925), Gadsden State Technical Institute (1960) and Gadsden State Junior College (1965). Gadsden State is accredited by the Southern Association of Colleges and Schools Commission on Colleges. It offers associate degree, certificate and non-credit courses thorough more than 70 programs. The college's campuses serve Calhoun, Cherokee (all but the northern one-sixth), Cleburne, Etowah and St. Clair (the northeastern third) counties, as well as neighboring counties in Georgia.

Gadsden's athletic teams compete in the Alabama Community College Conference (ACCC) of the National Junior College Athletic Association (NJCAA). They are collectively known as the Cardinals.

== History ==
The origin of Gadsden State Community College can be traced back to 1925, when the Alabama School of Trades was opened in Gadsden. The school initially offered training in the brick masonry, carpentry, electrical, and printing trades, and by 1941, 200 students were enrolled. The school's first permanent two-story buildings were built by students and government workmen. Renamed Alabama Technical College in 1973, it was the first state-operated trade school in the southern United States. It is the oldest component of GSCC and is currently known as East Broad Street Campus.

Founded by Eugene N. Prater, Gadsden Vocational Trade School was opened in 1960 as a private institution for black students, who were prevented from attending the Alabama School of Trades. The school initially offered training in auto mechanics and repair, plastering and cement finishing, brick masonry, woodworking, dry cleaning and laundry, general business, and tailoring. By 1961, 70 students were enrolled. The school was renamed Gadsden State Technical Institute in 1972 and designated a historically black college in 1997. Located in Gadsden, it is currently known as GSCC's Valley Street Campus.

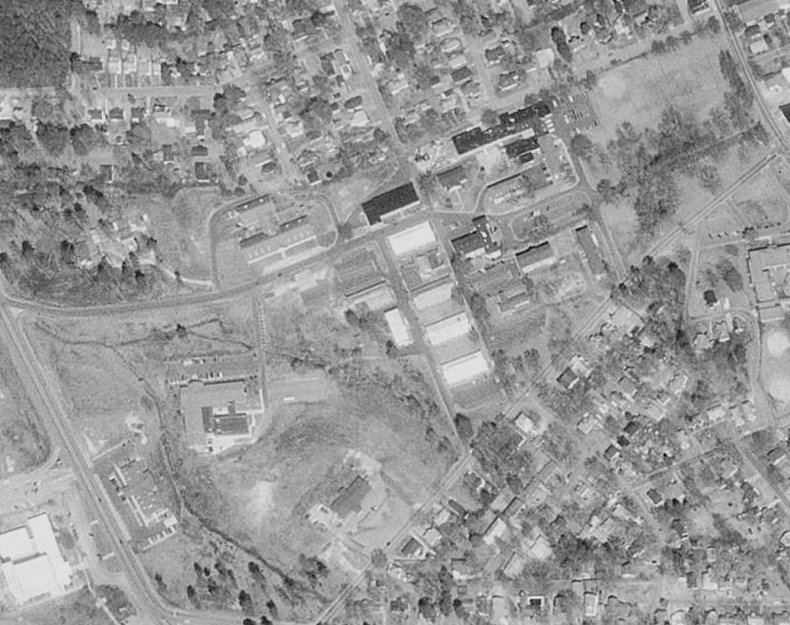
Aerial view of the GSCC campus in 1997

Gadsden State Junior College opened under the supervision of the Alabama State Board of Education and the Southern Association of Colleges and Schools. The college initially offered both professional and technical programs through day and night courses, which commenced in September 1965 with more than 700 students enrolled. Located in East Gadsden, Alabama, construction plans for the 115-acre (0.47 km^{2}) campus initially included an administration building, science building, library, student center and fine arts building. It is the Wallace Drive Campus of GSCC.

Gadsden State Community College was founded in 1985 through the merger of Alabama Technical College, Gadsden State Technical Institute, and Gadsden State Junior College as a part of a statewide effort to remove duplicate community college programs.

In 2002, the Gadsden State Cherokee Campus was opened in Centre to accommodate more students. Relocated in 2008, the campus is a multi-level complex that includes a 2,500-seat arena, 300-seat conference room and meeting rooms. It is home to the Economic Development Center for community outreach and development and contains offices of the Cherokee County Chamber of Commerce.

In 2003, Harry M. Ayers State Technical College was consolidated into Gadsden State Community College. Founded in 1963, it initially offered associate degree and certificate programs. Located in Anniston, it is currently known as GSCC's Ayers Campus.

In 2004, GSCC's McClellan Center was relocated to the former Fort McClellan Army Base. Located in Anniston, the center opened in 1970 and was known as the Anniston Center. After the McClellan Center closed in 2019, it was announced that the center's programs would be offered at Ayers Campus.

=== Presidents ===
- Allan D. Naylor, 1965–?
- William Blow, interim: 2011
- Raymond Staats, 2011–2013 (Note: resigned after a no-confidence vote)
- William Blow, interim: August 2013–2014
- Martha Lavender, interim: 2014–September 2015; acting: October 2015–August 2020
- Gregg Bennett interim: September 2020–December 2020
- Kathy Murphy, 2021–present

== Administration and organization ==
Gadsden State operates under four divisions: Academic, Career Technical, Health Sciences and Skills Training.

A typical academic year contains two 16-week terms during the fall (August–December) and spring (January–May). Within the terms are two eight-week accelerated sessions, or mini terms. The full summer term is nine weeks long (June–August). The four-week accelerated sessions during the summer (May–August) are known as Summer 1, Summer 2, and Summer 3. An academic year begins on the first day of the fall term and ends on the last day of the summer term.

Gadsden's endowment had a market value of approximately $3.41 million in the fiscal year that ended in 2019.

== ROTC ==
Gadsden State has a crosstown agreement with Jacksonville State University (JSU) for its Army Reserve Officers' Training Corps (ROTC) program. The program is re-evaluated annually, and when offered, is available to full-time GSCC students in good academic standing. JSU's program began in 1967 and is home to the Tiger Battalion.

== Academics and programs ==
Gadsden State has an open admissions policy and accepts life experience as credit. The college offers dual enrollment programs to local high school students through its Advanced College Enrollment Institute. In addition to its associate and certificate degree programs, Gadsden offers adult education courses as well as personal enrichment, professional enhancement and community service programs for youth and adults.

Gadsden has transfer agreements with every public four-year institution in Alabama. The agreements allow students to automatically transfer after completing an associate degree at Gadsden State.

== Student life ==
=== Student body ===
As of fall 2020, CCP's student body consists of 3,993 students. There are 52 percent full time and 48 percent part-time students.

Demographics of student body in fall 2020
| | Full and Part Time Students | U.S. Census (Note: People who identify as Hispanic/Latino are included in applicable race categories.) |
|---|---|---|
| International | 1% | N/A |
| Multiracial American | 3% | 2.8% |
| Black/African American | 17% | 13.4% |
| American Indian and Alaska Native | 0% | 1.3% |
| Asian | 0% | 5.9% |
| Non-Hispanic White American | 71% | 60.1% |
| Hispanic/Latino American | 5% | 18.5% |
| Native Hawaiian and Other Pacific Islander | 0% | 0.2% |
| Other/Unknown | 2% | N/A |

=== Organizations ===
More than 40 student clubs and organizations operate at Gadsden, including student government, special interest and service organizations.

Cultural groups on campus include: Baptist Campus Ministries, Cardinal Arts Journal, FCA Fellowship of Christian Athletes, Gadsden State Democrats/Republicans, Gadsden State Singers, Global Engagement Club, Gospel Singing, Show Band and Students Without Borders.

=== Athletics ===
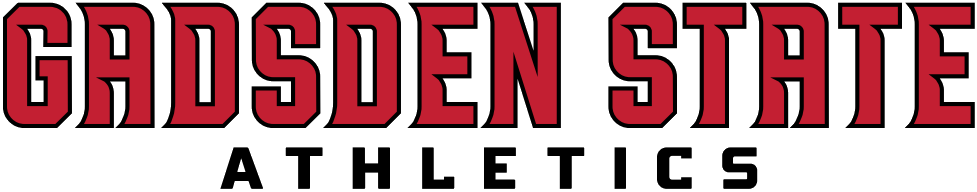
Gadsden State athletics wordmark

The GSCC athletic association chairs four varsity athletic programs: men's basketball and tennis and women's basketball and volleyball. The teams are collectively known as the Cardinals. They belong to the Alabama Community College Conference (ACCC) and Region 22 of the National Junior College Athletic Association (NJCAA).

GSCC's tennis team has won two conference championships.

GSCC's volleyball team was the NJCAA Gulf Atlantic District A/B Champion in 2019. The team advanced to the NJCAA Division I Volleyball Championship that year.

== Film ==
Due to its physical resemblance to Kent State University, Gadsden State was used for the filming of the television movie Kent State (1981), a docudrama about the Kent State shootings.

== Notable alumni ==
- Jeff Cook, musician, songwriter, founding member of Alabama
- Greg Jelks, former professional baseball player
- Andrew Pope, country music singer and songwriter
- John Solomon Sandridge, artist, author, educator
- Drake White, country music singer
