= Lawson State Community College =

Historically black college in Alabama, US

Coordinates: 33°27′4″N 86°53′22″W

- Former names: Wenonah State Technical Institute; Wenonah State Junior College; Wenonah Technical College; Theodore Alfred Lawson State Junior College
- Type: Public historically black community college
- Established: 1949; 77 years ago
- President: Dr. Cynthia T. Anthony
- Location: Birmingham, Alabama and Bessemer, Alabama, United States
- Campus: Birmingham Campus Bessemer Campus
- Colors: Navy Blue and Gold
- Nickname: Cougars
- Sporting affiliations: NJCAA, AACC
- Mascot: Cougar
- Website: www.lawsonstate.edu/

Lawson State Community College (Lawson State, Lawson, LSCC) is a public, historically black community college with campuses in Birmingham and Bessemer, Alabama. The technical division of the college was founded as Wenonah State Technical Institute in Birmingham in 1949. Lawson State is accredited by the Southern Association of Colleges and Schools Commission on Colleges, and offers nearly 200 associate degree and certificate programs.

LSCC's athletic teams compete in the Alabama Community College Conference (ACCC) of the National Junior College Athletic Association (NJCAA). They are collectively known as the Cougars.

In 2014, LSCC was announced as the leader of a four-year, $10 million federally-funded transportation industry training across four states. The college was ranked No. 5 on the Washington Monthly's Best Community Colleges list in 2013. The White House recognized LSCC as a "Champion of Change" in 2011 for its efforts to educate workers for its community.

== History ==
The technical division of Lawson State was founded in Birmingham, Alabama, in 1949, when the Wallace Patterson State Trade School Act of 1947 permitted the establishment of Wenonah State Technical Institute. The school was created to offer trade courses to Black students. Dr. Theodore Alfred Lawson served as the first director of the school, which was renamed Wenonah Technical College in 1963. LSCC's academic division, Wenonah State Junior College, was established in 1965 under Alabama state legislature. Dr. Lawson served as the first president of the junior college, which was also designed to serve Black students, and was renamed Theodore Alfred Lawson State Junior College in his honor.

On October 1, 1973, Wenonah Technical College and Theodore Alfred Lawson State Junior College merged to form T. A. Lawson State Community College at 3060 Wilson Road SW in Birmingham. This location is currently known as LSCC's Birmingham Campus.

In 2005, Bessemer State Technical College was set to merge with LSCC as a part of a statewide effort to remove duplicate community college programs. The merger was officially approved by the Alabama State Board of Education and Southern Association of Colleges and Schools in June 2005. As a result of the merger, Bessemer Technical College, located at 1100 Ninth Avenue SW in Bessemer, Alabama, became LSCC's Bessemer Campus.

== Administration and organization ==
LSCC operates under four divisions: Business Technologies, College Transfer (general education), Technical and Health Professions Programs.

LSCC's endowment had a market value of approximately $586,000 in the fiscal year that ended in 2019.

== Academics and programs ==
LSCC has an open admissions policy and offers credits for life experience. The college offers dual enrollment programs to local high school students, as well as a government-funded college preparatory program to students attending Birmingham-area high schools. In addition to its associate and certificate degree programs, LSCC offers adult education, GED and fast-track career training courses.

LSCC has transfer agreements with four-year institutions in Alabama. The agreements allow students to automatically transfer after completing an associate degree at LSCC.

LSCC is a Student Support Services TRIO program participant. The government-funded program helps students who are educationally disadvantaged and disabled graduate from college, and supports low-income and first-generation college students in achieving their career and economic goals.

LSCC's nursing program has ranked No. 1 in Alabama in 2017, 2018, 2019 and 2021.

== Student life ==
=== Student body ===
As of fall 2020, LSCC's student body consists of 2,823 students. There are 42 percent full time and 58 percent part time students.

Demographics of student body in fall 2020
	Full and Part Time Students	U.S. Census (Note: People who identify as Hispanic/Latino are included in applicable race categories.)
International	1%	N/A
Multiracial American	3%	2.8%
Black/African American	80%	13.4%
American Indian and Alaska Native	0%	1.3%
Asian	0%	5.9%
Non-Hispanic White American	13%	60.1%
Hispanic/Latino American	3%	18.5%
Native Hawaiian and Other Pacific Islander	0%	0.2%
Other/Unknown	0%	N/A

=== Organizations ===
Several student clubs and organizations operate at LSCC, including honors societies and student government, special interest and service organizations. Campus groups include: Ambassadors, American Welding Society and Human Services Club.

LSCC holds "Miss Lawson State Community College", an annual beauty pageant that honors a select group of current, high-achieving female students.

=== Athletics ===
The LSCC athletic association chairs four varsity athletic programs. The teams are collectively known as the Cougars. They belong to the Alabama Community College Conference (ACCC) and Region 22 of the National Junior College Athletic Association (NJCAA). Men's sports include basketball and baseball. Women's sports include basketball and volleyball. Although they are not affiliated with the NJCAA, LSCC also chairs a cheerleading squad and dance team.

== Presidents ==
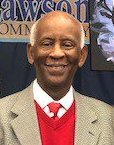
Former Lawson State president Perry W. Ward in 2018.

- Dr. Theodore A. Lawson, 1949–1971
- Dr. Leon Kennedy, 1971–1978
- Dr. Jesse J. Lewis, 1978–1987
- Dr. Perry W. Ward, 1987–2020
- Dr. Cynthia T. Anthony, (interim: September 2020 – March 2021, acting: April 2021–present)

== Notable alumni ==
- Coty Clarke, professional basketball player
- Mickell Gladness, professional basketball player
- Johnny High, former NBA player

== See also ==
- List of historically black colleges and universities
