= Sumiton, Alabama =

City in Alabama, United States

Sumiton
- City
- Flag

- Location of Sumiton in Jefferson County and Walker County, Alabama.
- Coordinates: 33°44′41″N 87°03′09″W
- Country: United States
- State: Alabama
- Counties: Walker, Jefferson

Area
  - Total: 5.22 sq mi (13.52 km^{2})
  - Land: 5.20 sq mi (13.47 km^{2})
  - Water: 0.023 sq mi (0.06 km^{2})
- Elevation: 463 ft (141 m)

Population (2020)
  - Total: 2,444
  - Density: 470/sq mi (181.5/km^{2})
- Time zone: UTC-6 (Central (CST))
  - Summer (DST): UTC-5 (CDT)
- ZIP code: 35148
- Area codes: 205, 659
- FIPS code: 01-73848
- GNIS feature ID: 2405542
- Website: Official website

Sumiton is a city in Jefferson and Walker counties in the State of Alabama. It incorporated in 1952. As of the 2020 census, Sumiton had a population of 2,444.

== Geography ==
According to the U.S. Census Bureau, the city has a total area of 5.3 square miles (14 km^{2}), all land.

== Demographics ==
Historical population
Census	Pop.	Note	%±
1950	1,334		—
1960	1,287		−3.5%
1970	2,374		84.5%
1980	2,815		18.6%
1990	2,604		−7.5%
2000	2,665		2.3%
2010	2,520		−5.4%
2020	2,444		−3.0%
U.S. Decennial Census; 2013 Estimate

=== Racial and ethnic composition ===
Sumiton city, Alabama – Racial and ethnic composition Note: the US Census treats Hispanic/Latino as an ethnic category. This table excludes Latinos from the racial categories and assigns them to a separate category. Hispanics/Latinos may be of any race.
Race / Ethnicity (NH = Non-Hispanic)	Pop 2000	Pop 2010	Pop 2020	% 2000	% 2010	% 2020
White alone (NH)	2,478	2,347	2,167	92.98%	93.13%	88.67%
Black or African American alone (NH)	96	101	112	3.60%	4.01%	4.58%
Native American or Alaska Native alone (NH)	9	9	9	0.34%	0.36%	0.37%
Asian alone (NH)	4	6	17	0.15%	0.24%	0.70%
Native Hawaiian or Pacific Islander alone (NH)	1	1	0	0.04%	0.04%	0.00%
Other race alone (NH)	3	0	3	0.11%	0.00%	0.12%
Mixed race or Multiracial (NH)	55	36	108	2.06%	1.43%	4.42%
Hispanic or Latino (any race)	19	20	28	0.71%	0.79%	1.15%
Total	2,665	2,520	2,444	100.00%	100.00%	100.00%

=== 2020 census ===
As of the 2020 census, Sumiton had a population of 2,444. The median age was 44.0 years. 20.6% of residents were under the age of 18 and 21.8% of residents were 65 years of age or older. For every 100 females there were 86.4 males, and for every 100 females age 18 and over there were 87.1 males age 18 and over.

0.0% of residents lived in urban areas, while 100.0% lived in rural areas.

There were 1,015 households in Sumiton, of which 28.7% had children under the age of 18 living in them. Of all households, 44.0% were married-couple households, 19.3% were households with a male householder and no spouse or partner present, and 32.6% were households with a female householder and no spouse or partner present. About 30.4% of all households were made up of individuals and 13.9% had someone living alone who was 65 years of age or older.

There were 1,100 housing units, of which 7.7% were vacant. The homeowner vacancy rate was 1.5% and the rental vacancy rate was 3.7%.

=== 2010 census ===
At the 2010 census, there were 2,520 people, 1,002 households, and 696 families living in the city. The population density was 475.5 inhabitants per square mile (183.6/km^{2}). There were 1,134 housing units at an average density of 214.0 per square mile (82.6/km^{2}). The racial makeup of the city was 93.2% White, 4.0% Black or African American, 0.4% Native American, 0.2% Asian, 0.0% Pacific Islander, 0.6% from other races, and 1.6% from two or more races. 0.8% of the population were Hispanic or Latino of any race.

Of the 1,002 households, 26.1% had children under the age of 18 living with them, 51.9% were married couples living together, 12.3% had a female householder with no husband present, and 30.5% were non-families. 27.1% of households were one person and 12.7% were one person aged 65 or older. The average household size was 2.50 and the average family size was 3.02.

The age distribution was 22.7% under the age of 18, 9.0% from 18 to 24, 23.2% from 25 to 44, 27.5% from 45 to 64, and 17.6% 65 or older. The median age was 41.4 years. For every 100 females, there were 88.6 males. For every 100 females age 18 and over, there were 90.3 males.

The median household income was $34,036 and the median family income was $45,028. Males had a median income of $43,500 versus $27,813 for females. The per capita income for the city was $19,162. About 15.4% of families and 18.4% of the population were below the poverty line, including 19.4% of those under age 18 and 9.6% of those age 65 or over.

=== 2000 census ===
At the 2000 census, there were 2,665 people, 1,096 households, and 780 families living in the city. The population density was 504.9 inhabitants per square mile (194.9/km^{2}). There were 1,205 housing units at an average density of 228.3 per square mile (88.1/km^{2}). The racial makeup of the city was 93.21% White, 3.60% Black or African American, 0.34% Native American, 0.15% Asian, 0.04% Pacific Islander, 0.60% from other races, and 2.06% from two or more races. 0.71% of the population were Hispanic or Latino of any race.

Of the 1,096 households 28.0% had children under the age of 18 living with them, 54.2% were married couples living together, 13.0% had a female householder with no husband present, and 28.8% were non-families. 27.1% of households were one person and 12.2% were one person aged 65 or older. The average household size was 2.39 and the average family size was 2.89.

The age distribution was 21.4% under the age of 18, 9.3% from 18 to 24, 25.8% from 25 to 44, 27.7% from 45 to 64, and 15.8% 65 or older. The median age was 40 years. For every 100 females, there were 91.5 males. For every 100 females age 18 and over, there were 90.4 males.

The median household income was $42,364 and the median family income was $36,086. Males had a median income of $36,979 versus $26,250 for females. The per capita income for the city was $15,032. About 15.5% of families and 17.0% of the population were below the poverty line, including 20.1% of those under age 18 and 16.7% of those age 65 or over.

== History ==
The city of Sumiton began after the Civil War as a mining town surrounding a railroad. It was incorporated in 1952. Sumiton's name is derived from its location being at one of the highest points in Walker County. It had also been previously known as Bald Eagle, Commercial, Democrat, and Summit. The first commercial mining venture in Sumiton was Philip and Moran's Mining Company. The first post office opened in 1924, and the first public school in 1940.

== Administration ==
As of 2023, the current mayor of Sumiton is Petey Ellis, and the city council members are Floyd Burton, Jimmy Dodd, Bill Fowler, Micah Harrison, and Ken Russell.

== Schools ==
- Sumiton is home to two public schools, Sumiton Middle School and Sumiton Elementary School. Their mascot is the Bulldogs.
- Sumiton has one private school, Sumiton Christian School, which includes K-12th grades. Their mascot is the Eagles.
- Bevill State Community College is also located in Sumiton.

== Parks ==
Sumiton has a newly renovated baseball/softball park located on main street (1039 Main Street Sumiton Al, 35148). This park is complete with a brand new playground. They also have a youth football field located beside the senior center (193 Bryan Road Sumiton Al, 35148).

== Police Department ==
Located inside of City Hall (416 State Street Sumiton Al, 35148)

Chief: TJ Burnett

Assistant Chief: Daryl Nibblett

== Fire Department ==
Located across from the Senior Center (228 Bryan Road Sumiton Al, 35148)

Chief: David Waid

== Notable people ==
- Harlan Mathews, United States Senator from Tennessee in 1993 and 1994
- Jimi Westbrook, member of Little Big Town
