= Reid State Community College =

Community college in Alabama, United States

- Type: Public community college
- Established: May 3, 1963
- President: Coretta Boykin
- Academic staff: 36
- Students: 760
- Location: Evergreen, Alabama, United States; 31°27′42″N 86°57′52″W
- Campus: Rural, 26 acres (.11 km²)
- Mascot: Lion
- Website: www.rstc.edu

Reid State Community College (formerly Reid State Technical College) is a public community college in Evergreen, Alabama. The college was established in 1963 and classes began in 1966.

== Name change ==
In September 2025, Reid State Technical College received final state approval to change its name to Reid State Community College, being one of the last technical colleges in Alabama within the Alabama Community College System to begin transitioning to community college status.
