= Snead State Community College =

Community college in Boaz, Alabama, U.S.

- Former names: Boaz Seminary, John H. Snead Seminary, Snead State Junior College
- Type: Public community college
- Established: 1898; 128 years ago
- President: Joe Whitmore
- Total staff: 142
- Students: 2,507
- Location: Boaz and Arab, Alabama, United States; 34°12′5″N 86°10′12″W
- Campus: 43 acres (17 ha)
- Mascot: Parsons
- Website: www.snead.edu
- Snead Junior College Historic District
- U.S. National Register of Historic Places
- U.S. Historic district
- Alabama Register of Landmarks and Heritage
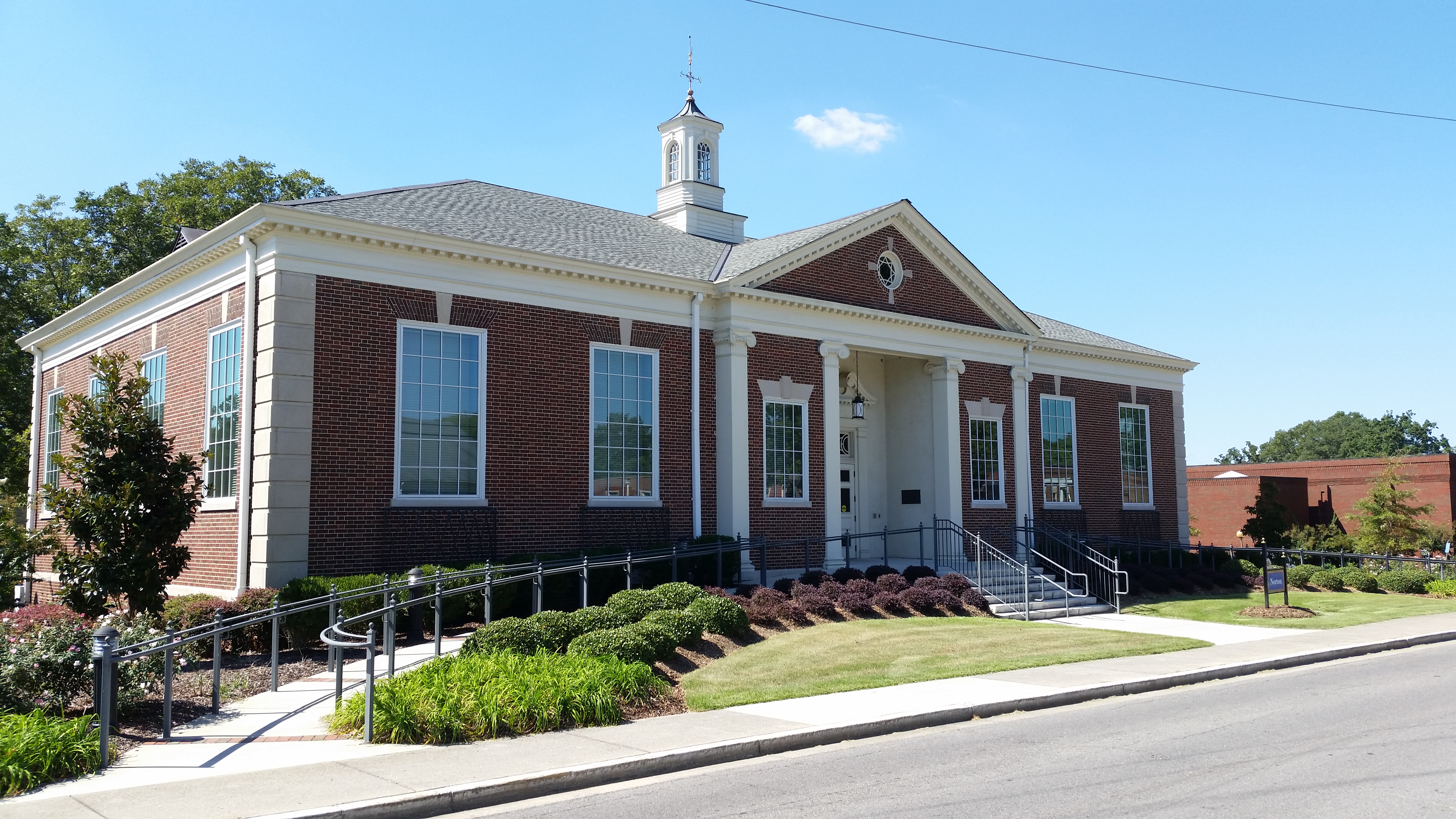
- The Norton Library and Museum
- Location: 220 N. Walnut St., 308 W. Mann Ave., 201 College Ave., and 300 and 301 Elder St., Boaz, Alabama
- Architect: Odis Clay Poundstone, Stuart E. Washburn
- Architectural style: Colonial Revival, Classical Revival
- NRHP reference No.: 99000468

Significant dates
- Added to NRHP: April 22, 1999
- Designated ARLH: April 6, 1998

Snead State Community College is a public community college in Boaz, Alabama. It began as a private seminary in 1898 and became part of the Alabama Community College System in 1967. Snead awards associate degrees in 79 programs and certificates in 24 programs.

== History ==
Snead began in 1898 as a grade school for girls in the house of its founder, Anna D. Elder. Oversight of the school was transferred to the state conference of the Methodist Episcopal Church later that year. By 1901, enrollment necessitated the construction of a separate building, allowing the addition of a high school. In 1906, local businessman John H. Snead donated land and money to the school, and it was renamed in his honor. After the city of Boaz built a public high school, Snead expanded to add a junior college in 1935; the primary and high schools were phased out three years later. The junior college gained accreditation from the Southern Association of Colleges and Schools in 1941. When the Alabama Community College System was created in 1963, enrollment at Snead suffered, and in 1967, the System acquired Snead, which became the 15th college in the system.

== Campus ==
The historic core of campus forms the Snead Junior College Historic District, which was listed on the Alabama Register of Landmarks and Heritage in 1998 and the National Register of Historic Places in 1999.

== Notable alumni ==
- Brock Colvin, member of the Alabama House of Representatives
