= Northeast Alabama Community College =

Public college near Rainsville, Alabama, US

- Type: Community college
- Established: 1963
- President: David Campbell
- Academic staff: 216
- Students: 3,370
- Location: Rainsville, Alabama, United States; 34.545493°N 85.912067°W
- Campus: Rural, 118 acres (.48 km^{2})
- Colors: Blue & White
- Mascot: Mustang
- Website: www.nacc.edu

Northeast Alabama Community College (NACC) is a public community college near Rainsville, Alabama. It offers programs leading to the associate degree in the arts, sciences, and applied sciences. NACC has an enrollment of just over 3,000 students. The college was founded in 1963 and built on the border between DeKalb and Jackson counties, partially in the small town of Powell.

In 2012, 2013, and 2014, the Aspen Institute named NACC one of the top 150 community colleges in the nation.

== History ==
Northeast Alabama Community College is one of twelve community colleges established in 1963 by the Alabama Legislature during the administration of George Wallace. NACC opened on September 30, 1965, under President Ernest Rudder Knox with an inaugural class of 380 freshmen. Operating under the quarter system, the college followed a general education curriculum in the liberal arts. Charles M. Pendley became president in 1982, and the college switched to the semester system in 1998. The current president, David Campbell, took office in 2001. The college continues to offer general education courses leading to degrees in the arts, sciences, and applied sciences, and NACC is accredited by the Southern Association of Colleges and Schools.

== Notable alumni ==
- Randy Owen, country music singer
