= Enterprise State Community College =

Public college in Enterprise, Alabama, US

Coordinates: 31.298°N 85.837°W

- Motto: Go Weevils
- Type: Public community college
- Established: 1965
- President: Matt Rodgers
- Location: Enterprise, Alabama, United States
- Campus: Multi-campus
- Colors: Green, white
- Mascot: Boll Weevil
- Website: www.escc.edu

Enterprise State Community College is a public community college in Enterprise, Alabama. It was created by the Alabama State Board of Education in February 2003 by reorganizing Enterprise State Junior College to include the Alabama Aviation Centers at Ozark and Mobile. In December 2009, the Alabama State Board of Education approved a name change for the college to Enterprise State Community College with a marketing name for the aviation programs as the Alabama Aviation College, a unit of Enterprise State Community College.

== Notable alumni ==
- Bobby Bright, United States Congressman from Alabama
- Barry Moore, incumbent representative representing Alabama's 1st congressional district
- Jerome Walton, 1989 Major League Baseball National League rookie of the year
