= Chattahoochee Valley Community College =

Public college in Phenix City, Alabama, US

- Former names: Chattahoochee Valley State Junior College; Chattahoochee Valley State Community College
- Type: Public community college
- Established: 1973
- Location: Phenix City, Alabama, United States; 32.424°N 85.031°W
- Campus: Rural
- Mascot: Pirates
- Website: www.cv.edu

Chattahoochee Valley Community College is a public community college in Phenix City, Alabama. It serves residents of Russell County and parts of Bullock, Lee, Macon, and Barbour Counties, as well as the Columbus, Georgia metropolitan area. Since 1975 it has shared its campus with Troy University's Phenix City Campus.

== History ==
The college was established in 1973 as the Chattahoochee Valley State Junior College by an act of the Alabama State Legislature. It opened in January 1974 in a temporary location with 280 students, and in April 1974 had 1,239 students. Local residents donated 103 acres (42 ha) of land for the college's permanent buildings. By 1976, the college had five new permanent buildings and 15 temporary buildings. The college has nine permanent buildings, the newest being the Instructional & Performing Arts Center (IPAC).

In the 1980s, the "junior" in the college's name was changed to "community". In 1996, the "state" was dropped, resulting in the current name, Chattahoochee Valley Community College.

The first president was Dr. Ralph M. Savage, appointed in October 1973. Subsequent presidents were Dr. James Owen (1980 until 1993), Dr. Richard Federinko (1993 to 2002), Dr. Laurel Blackwell (2003-2010) and Dr. Glen Cannon (2011-2014). The current interim president is Mr. Mark Ellard. In Spring of 2018, CVCC announced that Mrs. Jacqueline B. Screws was chosen as president after leading Wallace community college of Eufaula.

The Chattahoochee Valley Community College Foundation, an organization associated with the college, raises funds for student scholarships.
