= Wallace Community College Selma =

Public college in Selma, Alabama, US

- Other name: WCCS
- Type: Community college
- Established: 1963
- President: James Mitchell
- Academic staff: 122
- Students: 1,938
- Location: Selma, Alabama, U.S. 32.4464°N 87.0133°W
- Mascot: Patriots
- Website: www.wccs.edu

George Corley Wallace State Community College (referred to as Wallace Community College Selma or WCCS) is a community college in Selma, Alabama. As of the Fall 2010 semester, WCCS has an enrollment of 1,938 students. The college was founded in 1963. WCCS fields baseball and basketball teams as a member of the Alabama Community College Conference of the National Junior College Athletic Association.
