= Coastal Alabama Community College =

Public college in southern Alabama, US

- Type: Public community college
- Established: 2017
- Parent institution: Alabama Community College System
- Chancellor: Jimmy H. Baker
- President: Aaron Milner
- Faculty: 443 (2021)
- Students: 6,653 (2021)
- Location: Atmore, Bay Minette, Brewton, Fairhope, Foley, Gilbertown, Gulf Shores, Mobile, Monroeville and Thomasville, Alabama, United States; 30.85°N 87.78°W
- Mascot: Coyotes
- Website: www.coastalalabama.edu

Coastal Alabama Community College (also known as Coastal Alabama Community College – South) is a public community college with campuses in southern Alabama. Coastal Alabama was formed in 2017 through the consolidation of Alabama Southern Community College, Faulkner State Community College, and Jefferson Davis Community College.

== History ==
Coastal Alabama Community College was established in 2017 by the merging of three community colleges: Alabama Southern, Faulkner State, and Jefferson Davis.

== Accreditation ==
The college is accredited by the Commission on Colleges of the Southern Association of Colleges and Schools to award three different types of Associate degrees: Associate of Arts (AA), Associate in Science (AS), and Associate in Applied Science (AAS) degrees.

Additional accreditations:

- Accreditation Commission for Education in Nursing (ACEN)
- Alabama Board of Nursing
- American Dental Association (ADA); Commission On Dental Accreditation (CODA) Dental Assisting Programs
- America Culinary Federation Educational Institute
- Commission on Accreditation of Allied Health Education Programs (CAAHEP)
- Alabama Department of Public Health Office of Emergency Medical Services
- American Veterinary Medical Association (AVMA) Committee on Veterinary Technician Education and Activities (CVTEA)

== Campuses ==
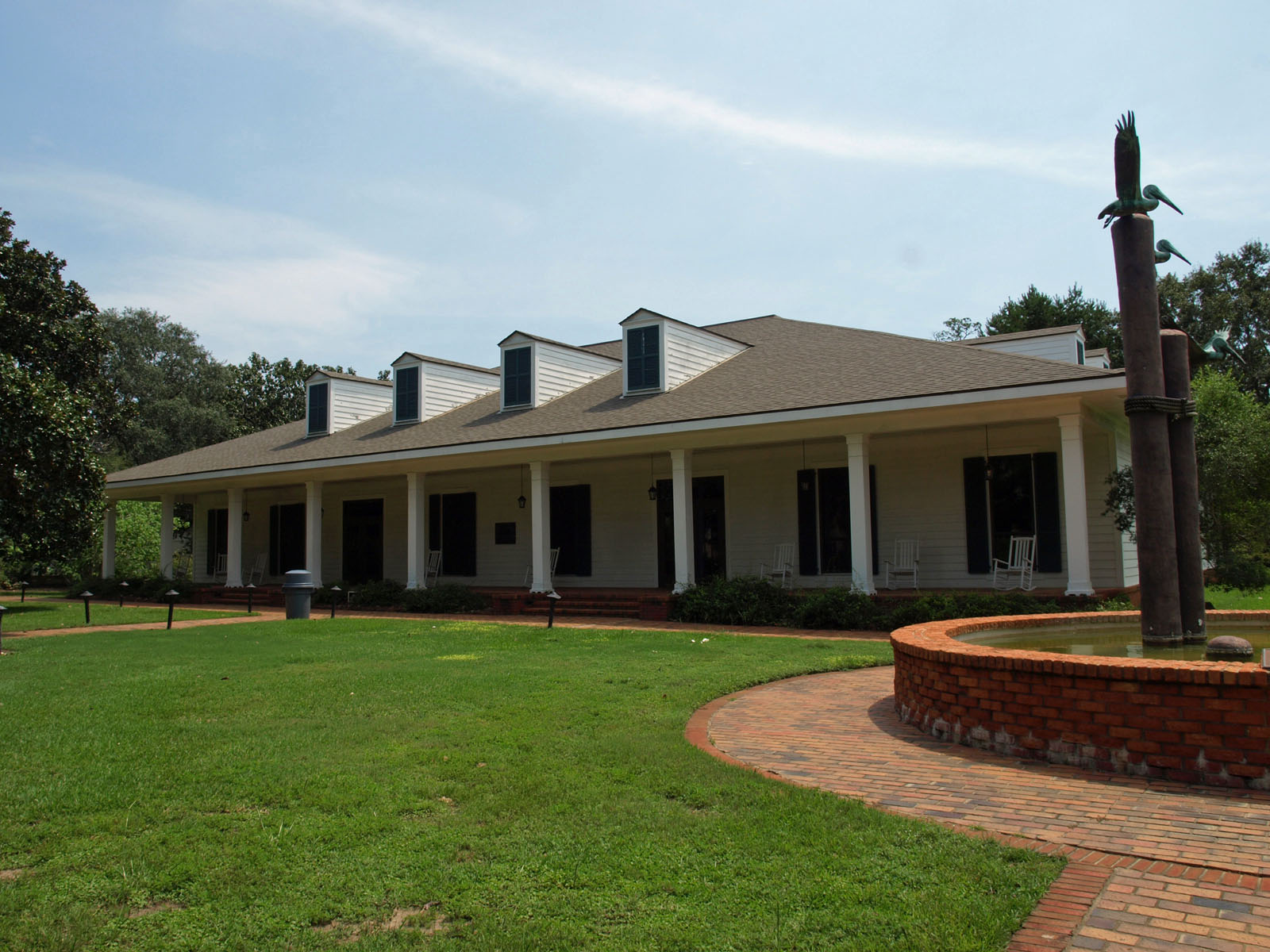
Fairhope Campus

Monroeville Campus

== Notable people ==
- John Bale, professional baseball player
