= Bevill State Community College =

Public college in Sumiton, Alabama and surrounds

Coordinates: 33.75146°N 87.05074°W

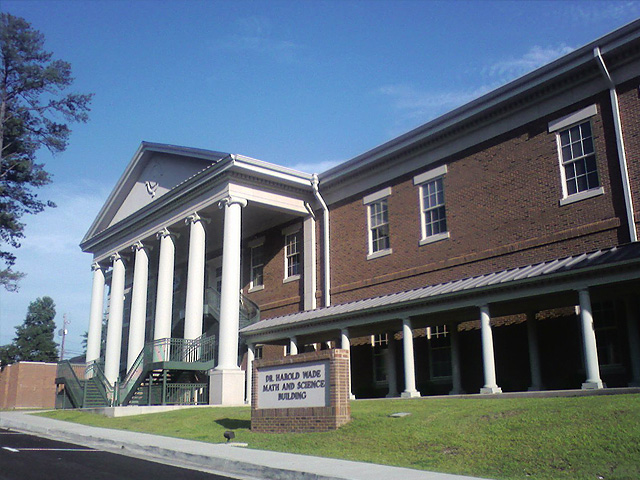
- Former names: Walker State Technical College; Brewer State Junior College; UAB/Walker College
- Type: Public community college
- Established: 1992; 34 years ago
- Affiliations: Alabama College System, Alabama Community College Conference
- President: Joel Hagood
- Students: 3,986
- Location: Sumiton, Fayette, Hamilton and Jasper, Alabama, United States
- Mascot: Bears
- Website: www.bscc.edu

Bevill State Community College is a public community college in Sumiton, Alabama. It enrolls 3,986 students and has been accredited by the Commission on Colleges of the Southern Association of Colleges and Schools since 1994. As of 2009, the college had four campuses and one center. the Fayette Campus, the Hamilton Campus, the Jasper Campus, the Sumiton Campus and the Pickens Center. The college's service area is a seven-county region containing over one-quarter million people.

== History ==
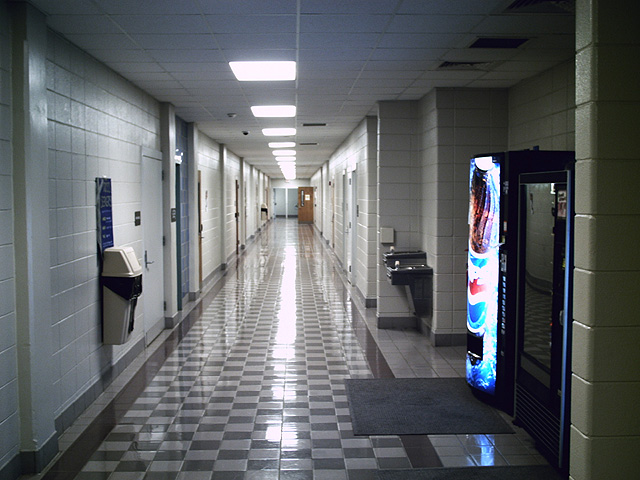
Allied Health Sciences Building, Ground Floor, Sumiton Campus

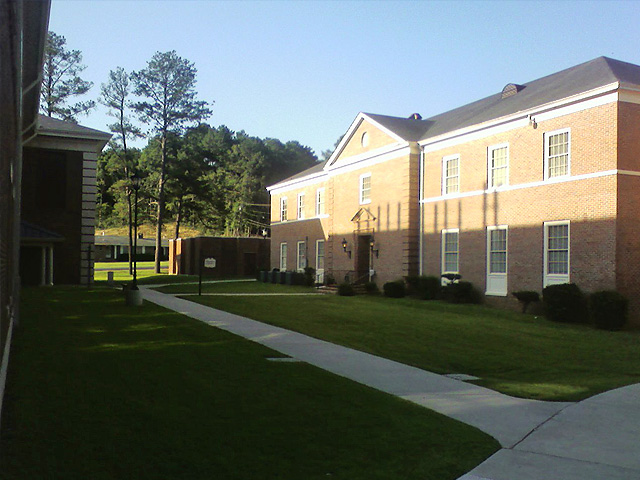
Irma Nicholson Library, Jasper Campus

Bevill State was formed in 1992 as a result of the merger of Walker State Technical College and Brewer State Junior College. The two institutions were created as a result of a 1963 enabling act of the Alabama legislature forming a statewide system of junior and technical colleges. The former opened in Sumiton in 1966, and the latter (named after former governor Albert P. Brewer) opened in Fayette in 1969.

The Hamilton campus of Northwest Alabama Community College, which had opened in 1966, was merged into Bevill State in 1993.

Walker College was founded in 1938 by Dr. Carl Jesse as a private junior college. In 1993, the financially struggling college was acquired by the University of Alabama System and merged into the University of Alabama at Birmingham as UAB Walker College. After a five-year affiliation did not pan out financially, the campus was acquired by Bevill State to become the Jasper campus.

In 2007, the Pickens County Education Center was opened in Carrollton. It is overseen by the Fayette campus.

== Athletics ==
The college formerly fielded teams in baseball, basketball, cross country, and softball at some of its various campuses, in the Alabama Community College Conference.

In 2017, it was announced that Bevill State would be bringing back athletics for the 2017–18 school year after its previous suspension. It offers different sports on its various campuses.

== Campus maps ==
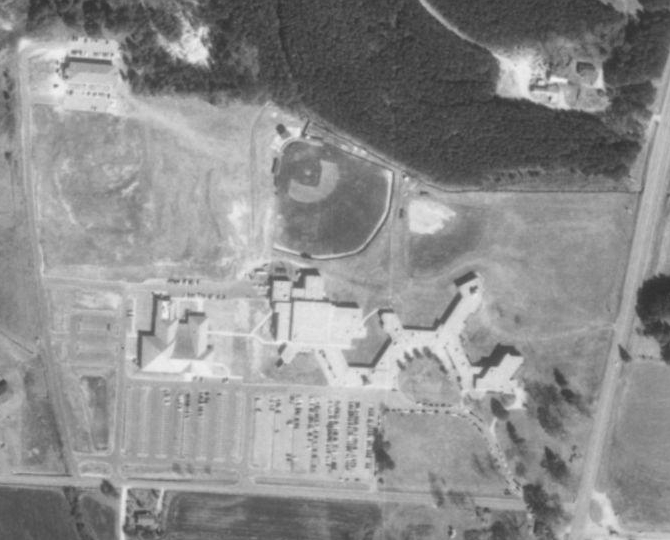
Fayette campus

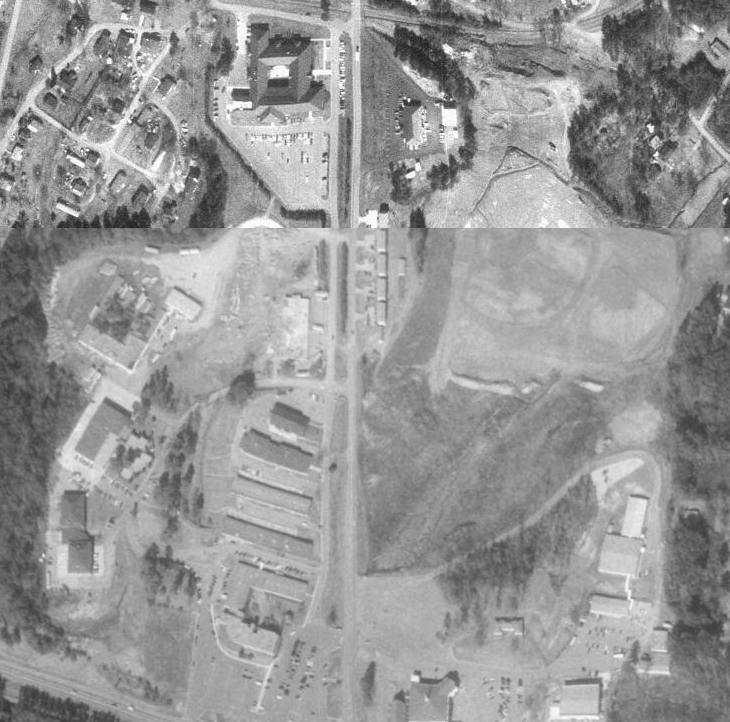
Sumiton campus

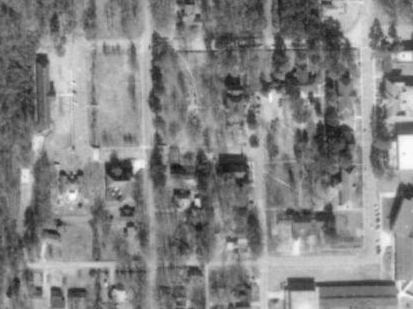
Jasper campus

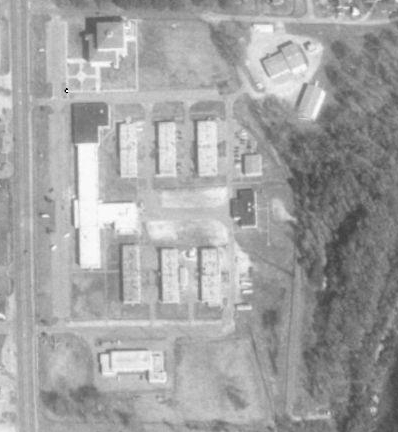
Hamilton campus
