= Lurleen B. Wallace Community College =

Multi-campus public college in Alabama, US

- Type: Public community college
- Established: 1969; 57 years ago
- President: Brock Kelley
- Academic staff: 118
- Students: 1,790
- Location: Andalusia, Greenville, and Opp, Alabama, U.S. Andalusia: 31°19′21″N 86°27′10″W; Greenville: 31°50′15″N 8°36′39″W; MacArthur (Opp): 31°18′25″N 86°15′14″W
- Campus: Andalusia: 160 acres (65 ha) Greenville: 17 acres (6.9 ha) MacArthur (Opp): 100 acres (40 ha)
- Colors: Blue, white, red
- Nickname: Saints
- Sporting affiliations: NJCAA Division 1 Region 22, Alabama Community College Conference
- Website: www.lbwcc.edu

Lurleen B. Wallace Community College (LBWCC) is a public community college with campuses in Andalusia, Greenville, Opp, and Luverne, Alabama. As of the fall 2010 semester, the college has an enrollment of 1,790 students across all campuses. The college was founded in 1969 and named for Governor Lurleen Burns Wallace. In 1992, it opened the campus in Greenville. In 2003, LBWCC merged with Douglas MacArthur State Technical College, which opened in 1965. Athletic teams representing LBWCC compete in the Alabama Community College Conference of the National Junior College Athletic Association.
