= Central Alabama Community College =

College in Alexander City, Alabama, US

Coordinates: 32.92623°N 85.94649°W

- Former names: Alexander City State Junior College (1963-1989); Nunnelley State Technical College (1963-1989); Sylacauga School of Nursing (1921-1994); Coosa Valley School of Nursing (1994-1996)
- Type: Public community college
- Established: 1963; 63 years ago
- Parent institution: Alabama College System, Alabama Community College Conference
- Endowment: $147k (2021)
- President: Jeff Lynn
- Total staff: 106
- Students: 1,777
- Location: Alexander City, Alabama
- Campus: 90 acres (36 ha)
- Mascot: Trojans
- Website: cacc.edu
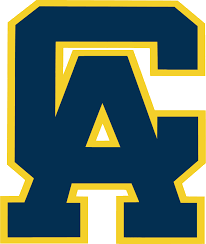

Central Alabama Community College (CACC) is a public community college in Alexander City, Alabama, United States. The college enrolls over 1,500 students and has been accredited by the Commission on Colleges of the Southern Association of Colleges and Schools since 1969. As of 2018, the college has two campuses: the Alexander City Campus and the Childersburg Campus, and two instructional centers: the Talladega Center and the Pratt's Mill Center in Prattville.

== History ==
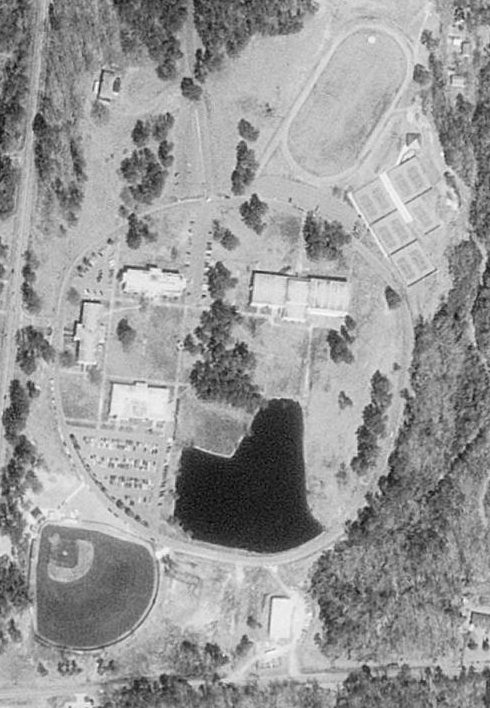
Aerial view of the Alexander City campus

CACC traces its history to the Alabama State Legislature Act No. 93 passed in 1963 which provided for the establishment of several institutions of higher learning in Alabama. The college opened as Alexander City State Junior College in 1965 in the old Russell Hospital in Alexander City. In 1966 the college moved to its current campus in a dedication ceremony led by then-Governor George Corley Wallace. Also in 1966, the state opened Nunnelley State Technical College in Childersburg, Alabama as part of the No. 93 Act of 1963. In 1989 the Alabama State Board of Education merged the technical college and the junior college to form the present day community college.

=== Nursing school ===
In 1921 the Sylacauga School of Nursing was founded as hospital diploma program. The school was later renamed as Coosa Valley School of Nursing (CVSN) in 1994 began offering associate degrees in nursing. CVSN had partnered with CACC since 1972 in various academic programs and in 1996 merged with CACC.

== Athletics ==
CACC fields teams in men's golf and baseball and women's tennis and softball in the Alabama Community College Conference.
