= Wallace Community College =

Public college in Dothan, Alabama, US

George C. Wallace State Community College
- Wallace Community College
- WCC logo
- Former names: George C. Wallace State Technical Trade School; George C. Wallace State Vocational Trade School; George C. Wallace State Technical Junior College; Alabama Aviation and Technical College; Sparks State Technical School; Sparks State Technical College
- Type: Public community college
- Established: 1949
- Parent institution: Alabama Community College System
- President: Kathy L. Murphy
- Location: Dothan, Alabama; 31.31745°N 85.46460°W
- Mascot: Governors
- Website: www.wallace.edu

Wallace Community College (WCC) (formally George C. Wallace Community College) is a public community college in Dothan, Alabama, United States. It is named after the father of Alabama governor George Wallace. It serves approximately 6,000 students with its academic, health sciences, and career technical programs, in addition to its adult education, workforce development, and continuing education programs. The college has been accredited by the Commission on Colleges of the Southern Association of Colleges and Schools since 1969.

Established in 1949, George C. Wallace Community College, with campuses in Dothan and Eufaula, is one of the largest and oldest community colleges in Alabama. It is part of the Alabama Community College System.

== Athletics ==
WCC maintains a men's baseball team, women's softball team, men's Golf team, and men's and women's Cross Country teams; all teams participate in the Alabama Community College Conference. The college is also adding women's Volleyball and men's and women's track in the fall of 2027.
