= Wallace State Community College =

Public college in Hanceville, Alabama, US

Coordinates: 34.07248°N 86.77663°W

- Type: Public community college
- Established: 1966
- Accreditation: Southern Association of Colleges and Schools
- President: Vicki Hawsey Karolewics
- Location: Hanceville, Alabama, United States
- Website: www.wallacestate.edu

Wallace State Community College (formally George C Wallace State Community College) is a public community college in Hanceville, Alabama. Founded in 1966 as the George C. Wallace State Trade School of Cullman County, the college currently enrolls approximately 6,000 students and offers more than 50 associate degree and certificate programs in academic, health, and technical programs.

== History ==
The college was founded in 1966. It is named for former Alabama governor George C. Wallace, who greatly expanded Alabama's community college system.

== Campus ==
The college campus is in Hanceville, Alabama. The campus is approximately 300 acres. It includes the 13 floor Bailey Building, that is home to the administration. The Tom Drake Coliseum hosts graduation, basketball, and volleyball, seats 5,000. The college also has an Academic Center and a Technical Center in Oneonta, Alabama. The Oneonta Center was opened in 2016.

== Organization and administration ==
Wallace State maintains a partnership with Athens State University, which enables students to complete junior- and senior-level classes leading to a baccalaureate degree on the Wallace State campus.

== Academics ==
Wallace State is accredited by the Commission on Colleges of the Southern Association of Colleges and Schools to award the Associate in Arts, Associate in Science, and Associate in Applied Science degrees. Many programs have additional accreditation from organizations appropriate to the particular disciplines.

== Athletics ==
School sports include baseball, basketball, cheerleading, men’s and women’s golf, men’s and women’s tennis, men’s and women’s cross country, softball, and volleyball. The college also offers intramural sports in volleyball (indoor and grass), flag football, pickleball, basketball, indoor soccer, wallyball, tennis, ping pong, pool, disc golf, wiffle ball, and spikeball.

== Notable alumni ==
- Marcus Brimage (attended), professional mixed martial artist
- Lester "Bubba" Carpenter, member of the Mississippi House of Representatives; First District of Mississippi
- Gary Christian, professional golfer
- Jake Elmore, baseball player
- Mickey Gorka (born 1972), Israeli basketball player and coach
- Derek Holland, baseball player
- Fredrik Jacobson, professional golfer
- Craig Kimbrel, baseball player
- Kip Moore, country music singer
- Lee Moore, professional basketball player
- Adrian Pledger (born 1976), basketball player
- Jimi Westbrook, musician, of Little Big Town
- Brett Wetterich, professional golfer
- Zelous Wheeler, baseball player
