= List of college athletic programs in Michigan =

This is a list of college athletic programs in the U.S. state of Michigan.

== NCAA ==
=== Division I ===
Full NCAA Division I member colleges in Michigan
- FBS Football, - Non-football

Team	School	City	Conference	Sport sponsorship								
Team	School	City	Conference	Football	Basketball		Baseball	Softball	Ice hockey		Soccer	
Team	School	City	Conference	Football	M	W	Baseball	Softball	M	W	M	W
Central Michigan Chippewas	Central Michigan University	Mount Pleasant	Mid-American	FBS	Yes	Yes	Yes	Yes	No	No	No	Yes
Detroit Mercy Titans	University of Detroit Mercy	Detroit	Horizon	No	Yes	Yes	No	Yes	No	No	Yes	Yes
Eastern Michigan Eagles	Eastern Michigan University	Ypsilanti	Mid-American	FBS	Yes	Yes	Yes	No	No	No	No	Yes
Michigan Wolverines	University of Michigan	Ann Arbor	Big Ten	FBS	Yes	Yes	Yes	Yes	Yes	No	Yes	Yes
Michigan State Spartans	Michigan State University	East Lansing	Big Ten	FBS	Yes	Yes	Yes	Yes	Yes	No	Yes	Yes
Oakland Golden Grizzlies	Oakland University	Rochester	Horizon	No	Yes	Yes	Yes	Yes	No	No	Yes	Yes
Western Michigan Broncos	Western Michigan University	Kalamazoo	Mid-American	FBS	Yes	Yes	Yes	Yes	Yes (Note: Western Michigan's men's ice hockey team competes in the National Collegiate Hockey Conference.)	No	Yes (Note: Western Michigan's men's soccer team competes in the Missouri Valley Conference.)	Yes

=== Division II ===
Full NCAA Division II member colleges in Michigan
- Football, - Non-football

Team	School	City	Conference	Sport sponsorship								
Team	School	City	Conference	Football	Basketball		Baseball	Softball	Ice hockey		Soccer	
Team	School	City	Conference	Football	M	W	Baseball	Softball	M	W	M	W
Davenport Panthers	Davenport University	Grand Rapids	GLIAC	Yes	Yes	Yes	Yes	Yes	No	No	Yes	Yes
Ferris State Bulldogs	Ferris State University	Big Rapids	GLIAC	Yes	Yes	Yes	No	Yes	Yes (Note: Ferris State, Lake Superior State, Michigan Tech, and Northern Michigan's men's ice hockey teams all compete in Division I as members of the Central Collegiate Hockey Association.)	No	No	Yes
Grand Valley State Lakers	Grand Valley State University	Allendale	GLIAC	Yes	Yes	Yes	Yes	Yes	No	No	No	Yes
Hillsdale Chargers	Hillsdale College	Hillsdale	Great Midwest	Yes	Yes	Yes	Yes	Yes	No	No	No	No
Lake Superior State Lakers	Lake Superior State University	Sault Ste. Marie	GLIAC	No	Yes	Yes	No	No	Yes	No	No	No
Michigan Tech Huskies	Michigan Technological University	Houghton	GLIAC	Yes	Yes	Yes	No	No	Yes	No	No	Yes
Northern Michigan Wildcats	Northern Michigan University	Marquette	GLIAC	Yes	Yes	Yes	No	No	Yes	No	Yes	Yes
Northwood Timberwolves	Northwood University	Midland	Great Midwest	Yes	Yes	Yes	Yes	Yes	No	No	Yes	Yes
Saginaw Valley State Cardinals	Saginaw Valley State University	University Center	GLIAC	Yes	Yes	Yes	Yes	Yes	No	No	Yes	Yes
Wayne State Warriors	Wayne State University	Detroit	GLIAC	Yes	Yes	Yes	Yes	Yes	No	No	No	No

=== Division III ===
Full NCAA Division III member colleges in Michigan
- Football

Team	School	City	Conference	Sport sponsorship								
Team	School	City	Conference	Football	Basketball		Baseball	Softball	Ice hockey		Soccer	
Team	School	City	Conference	Football	M	W	Baseball	Softball	M	W	M	W
Adrian Bulldogs	Adrian College	Adrian	Michigan	Yes	Yes	Yes	Yes	Yes	Yes (Note: Adrian's ice hockey teams compete in the Northern Collegiate Hockey Association.)	Yes	Yes	Yes
Albion Britons	Albion College	Albion	Michigan	Yes	Yes	Yes	Yes	Yes	No	No	Yes	Yes
Alma Scots	Alma College	Alma	Michigan	Yes	Yes	Yes	Yes	Yes	No	No	Yes	Yes
Calvin Knights	Calvin University	Grand Rapids	Michigan	Yes	Yes	Yes	Yes	Yes	Yes (Note: Calvin's ice hockey team competes in the Great Lakes Collegiate Hockey League.)	No	Yes	Yes
Hope Flying Dutchmen and Flying Dutch	Hope College	Holland	Michigan	Yes	Yes	Yes	Yes	Yes	No	No	Yes	Yes
Kalamazoo Hornets	Kalamazoo College	Kalamazoo	Michigan	Yes	Yes	Yes	Yes	Yes	No	No	Yes	Yes
Olivet Comets	University of Olivet	Olivet	Michigan	Yes	Yes	Yes	Yes	Yes	No	No	Yes	Yes

== NAIA ==
Full NAIA member colleges in Michigan.
– Football member, – Non-football member

Team	School	City	Conference	Sport sponsorship								
Team	School	City	Conference	Football	Basketball		Baseball	Softball	Ice hockey		Soccer	
Team	School	City	Conference	Football	M	W	Baseball	Softball	M	W	M	W
Aquinas Saints	Aquinas College	Grand Rapids	Wolverine-Hoosier	No	Yes	Yes	Yes	Yes	Yes	Yes	Yes	Yes
Cleary Cougars	Cleary University	Howell	Wolverine-Hoosier	No	Yes	Yes	Yes	Yes	Yes	Yes	Yes	Yes
Cornerstone Golden Eagles	Cornerstone University	Grand Rapids	Wolverine-Hoosier	No	Yes	Yes	Yes	Yes	No	No	Yes	Yes
Lawrence Tech Blue Devils	Lawrence Technological University	Southfield	Wolverine-Hoosier	Yes (Note: The football teams of Lawrence Tech, Madonna, and Siena Heights football teams compete in the Mid-States Football Association.)	Yes	Yes	Yes	Yes	Yes	No	Yes	Yes
Madonna Crusaders	Madonna University	Livonia	Wolverine-Hoosier	Yes	Yes	Yes	Yes	Yes	No	No	Yes	Yes
Rochester Warriors	Rochester Christian University	Rochester Hills	Wolverine-Hoosier	No	Yes	Yes	Yes	Yes	Yes	No	Yes	Yes
Spring Arbor Cougars	Spring Arbor University	Spring Arbor	Crossroads	No	Yes	Yes	Yes	Yes	No	No	Yes	Yes
UM-Dearborn Wolverines	University of Michigan-Dearborn	Dearborn	Wolverine-Hoosier	No	Yes	Yes	Yes	Yes	Yes	Yes	Yes	Yes

== NJCAA ==
Team	School	City	Conference
Alpena Lumberjacks	Alpena Community College	Alpena	Michigan CC
Bay College Norse	Bay de Noc Community College	Escanaba	Michigan CC
Delta Pioneers	Delta College	University Center	Michigan CC
Glen Oaks Vikings	Glen Oaks Community College	Centreville	Michigan CC
Gogebic Samsons	Gogebic Community College	Ironwood	Independent
Grand Rapids Raiders	Grand Rapids Community College	Grand Rapids	Michigan CC
Henry Ford Hawks	Henry Ford College	Dearborn	Michigan CC
Jackson Jets	Jackson College	Jackson	Michigan CC
Kalamazoo Valley Cougars	Kalamazoo Valley Community College	Kalamazoo	Michigan CC
Kellogg Bruins	Kellogg Community College	Battle Creek	Michigan CC
Kirtland Firebirds	Kirtland Community College	Grayling	Michigan CC
Lake Michigan Red Hawks	Lake Michigan College	Benton Harbor	Michigan CC
Lansing Stars	Lansing Community College	Lansing	Michigan CC
Macomb Monarchs	Macomb Community College	Warren	Michigan CC
Mid Michigan Lakers	Mid Michigan Community College	Harrison	Michigan CC
Montcalm Centurions	Montcalm Community College	Sidney	Michigan CC
Mott Bears	Mott Community College	Flint	Michigan CC
Muskegon Jayhawks	Muskegon Community College	Muskegon	Michigan CC
North Central Michigan Timberwolves	North Central Michigan College	Petoskey	Michigan CC
Oakland Owls	Oakland Community College	Waterford	Michigan CC
Schoolcraft Ocelots	Schoolcraft College	Livonia	Michigan CC
Southwestern Michigan Roadrunners	Southwestern Michigan College	Dowagiac	Michigan CC
St. Clair County Skippers	St. Clair County Community College	Port Huron	Michigan CC
Wayne County Wildcats	Wayne County Community College District	Detroit	Michigan CC

== NCCAA ==
Team	School	City	Conference
Grace Christian Tigers	Grace Christian University	Grand Rapids	Independent
Great Lakes Christian Crusaders	Great Lakes Christian College	Delta Township	Independent
Kuyper Cougars	Kuyper College	Grand Rapids	Independent

== USCAA ==
Team	School	City	Conference
Andrews Cardinals	Andrews University	Berrien Springs	Independent

== See also ==
- List of NCAA Division I institutions
- List of NCAA Division II institutions
- List of NCAA Division III institutions
- List of NAIA institutions
- List of USCAA institutions
- List of NCCAA institutions
- List of NJCAA Division I institutions
- List of NJCAA Division II institutions
- List of NJCAA Division III institutions
