= List of two-year colleges in the United States with campus housing =

Most community colleges in the United States do not offer on-campus housing for students. These institutions were established primarily to provide low-cost education for students who commute from their homes. However, there is an increasing trend toward offering dormitories on these campuses, particularly because increased costs are causing more students who would typically enroll in a traditional four-year college to attend a two-year school instead. Also, community colleges are increasingly recruiting student athletes and students from outside the U.S., who are more likely to need or want on-campus housing.

Community colleges providing arrangements for on-campus student housing are listed below.

== United States community colleges with campus housing ==
College	City	State
Coastal Alabama Community College	Bay Minette	Alabama
Lawson State Community College	Bessemer	Alabama
Snead State Community College	Boaz	Alabama
Wallace State Community College	Hanceville	Alabama
Gadsden State Community College	Gadsden	Alabama
Prince William Sound College	Valdez	Alaska
Cochise College	Douglas	Arizona
Yavapai College	Prescott	Arizona
Eastern Arizona College	Thatcher	Arizona
Arizona Western College	Yuma	Arizona
Central Arizona College	Coolidge	Arizona
Arkansas State University-Beebe	Beebe	Arkansas
Coalinga College	Coalinga	California
College of the Redwoods	Eureka	California
Lake Tahoe Community College	Lake Tahoe	California
Cerro Coso College - Mammoth Campus	Mammoth Lakes	California
Napa Valley College	Napa	California
Feather River College	Quincy	California
Shasta College	Redding	California
Reedley College	Reedley	California
Sierra College	Rocklin	California
Columbia College	Sonora	California
Lassen College	Susanville	California
Taft College	Taft	California
College of the Siskiyous	Weed	California
Colorado Mountain College	Glenwood Springs	Colorado
Colorado Northwestern Community College	Rangely	Colorado
Northeastern Junior College	Sterling	Colorado
Trinidad State College	Trinidad	Colorado
Western Colorado Community College	Grand Junction	Colorado
University of the District of Columbia	Washington	District of Columbia
Florida SouthWestern State College	Fort Myers	Florida
Indian River State College	Fort Pierce	Florida
Florida Keys Community College	Key West	Florida
College of Central Florida	Ocala	Florida
Hillsborough Community College	Tampa	Florida
Gordon College	Barnesville	Georgia
Andrew College	Cuthbert	Georgia
Abraham Baldwin Agricultural College	Tifton	Georgia
College of Southern Idaho	Twin Falls	Idaho
North Idaho College	Coeur d'Alene	Idaho
Lincoln College	Lincoln	Illinois
Shawnee Community College	Ullin	Illinois
Ancilla College	Plymouth	Indiana
Iowa Western Community College	Council Bluffs	Iowa
Southwestern Community College	Creston	Iowa
Iowa Central Community College	Fort Dodge	Iowa
Ellsworth Community College	Iowa Falls	Iowa
Iowa Lakes Community College	Estherville	Iowa
Marshalltown Community College	Marshalltown	Iowa
North Iowa Area Community College	Mason City	Iowa
Indian Hills Community College	Ottumwa	Iowa
Northwest Iowa Community College	Sheldon	Iowa
Western Iowa Tech	Sioux City	Iowa
Neosho County Community College	Chanute	Kansas
Dodge City Community College	Dodge City	Kansas
Garden City Community College	Garden City	Kansas
Barton Community College	Great Bend	Kansas
Hutchinson Community College	Hutchinson	Kansas
Independence Community College	Independence	Kansas
Coffeyville Community College	Montgomery County	Kansas
Central Maine Community College	Auburn	Maine
Northern Maine Community College	Presque Isle	Maine
Washington County Community College	Calais	Maine
Southern Maine Community College	South Portland	Maine
Allegany College of Maryland	Cumberland	Maryland
Garrett College	McHenry	Maryland
Alpena Community College	Alpena	Michigan
Bay de Noc Community College	Escanaba	Michigan
Gogebic Community College	Ironwood	Michigan
Glen Oaks Community College	Centreville	Michigan
Lake Michigan College	Benton Harbor	Michigan
St. Clair County Community College	Port Huron	Michigan
Southwestern Michigan College	Dowagiac	Michigan
Jackson College	Jackson	Michigan
North Central Michigan College	Petoskey	Michigan
Northwestern Michigan College	Traverse City	Michigan
Century College	White Bear	Minnesota
Itasca Community College	Grand Rapids	Minnesota
Minnesota West Community and Technical College (Canby)	Canby	Minnesota
Hinds Community College	Raymond	Mississippi
Southwest Mississippi Community College	Summit	Mississippi
Mississippi Gulf Coast Community College	Perkinston	Mississippi
Pearl River Community College	Poplarville	Mississippi
Jefferson College	Jefferson County	Missouri
Moberly Area Community College	Moberly	Missouri
Crowder College	Neosho	Missouri
State Fair Community College	Sedalia	Missouri
Three Rivers Community College	Poplar Bluff	Missouri
Dawson Community College	Glendive	Montana
Flathead Valley Community College	Kalispell	Montana
Metropolitan Community College	Omaha	Nebraska
Northeast Community College	Norfolk	Nebraska
NHTI, Concord's Community College	Concord	New Hampshire
San Juan College	Farmington	New Mexico
NMJC, New Mexico Junior College	Hobbs	New Mexico
NMMI, New Mexico Military Institute	Roswell	New Mexico
Great Basin College	Elko	Nevada
Genesee Community College	Batavia	New York
Herkimer County Community College	Herkimer	New York
Jamestown Community College	Jamestown	New York
Fulton–Montgomery Community College	Johnstown	New York
Monroe Community College	Monroe County	New York
Dutchess Community College	Poughkeepsie	New York
SUNY Adirondack	Queensbury	New York
SUNY Broome Community College	Broome County	New York
SUNY Niagara	Sanborn	New York
Sullivan County Community College	Sullivan County	New York
Onondaga Community College	Syracuse	New York
Tompkins Cortland Community College	Dryden	New York
Mohawk Valley Community College	Utica	New York
Louisburg College	Louisburg	North Carolina
Lake Region State College	Devils Lake	North Dakota
North Dakota State College of Science	Wahpeton	North Dakota
Dakota College at Bottineau	Bottineau	North Dakota
Hocking College	Nelsonville	Ohio
Terra State Community College	Fremont	Ohio
Rose State College	Midwest City	Oklahoma
Central Oregon Community College	Bend	Oregon
Lane Community College	Eugene	Oregon
Southwestern Oregon Community College	Coos Bay	Oregon
Treasure Valley Community College	Ontario	Oregon
Northampton Community College	Bethlehem	Pennsylvania
Navarro College	Corsicana	Texas
Blinn College	Brenham	Texas
Collin College	Collin	Texas
Grayson County College	Denison	Texas
North Central Texas College	Gainesville	Texas
Kilgore College	Kilgore	Texas
Laredo Community College	Laredo	Texas
Lamar Port Arthur Community College	Port Arthur	Texas
Odessa College	Odessa	Texas
Temple College	Temple	Texas
Tyler Junior College	Tyler	Texas
Weatherford College	Weatherford	Texas
Western Texas College	Snyder	Texas
Snow College	Ephraim	Utah
Richard Bland College	Prince George County	Virginia
Bellevue College	Bellevue	Washington
Green River Community College	Auburn	Washington
Edmonds College	Lynnwood	Washington
Skagit Valley College	Mount Vernon	Washington
Yakima Valley Community College	Yakima	Washington
Big Bend Community College	Moses Lake	Washington
Potomac State College of West Virginia University	Keyser	West Virginia
Casper College	Casper	Wyoming
Eastern Wyoming College	Torrington	Wyoming
Central Wyoming College	Riverton	Wyoming
Laramie County Community College	Cheyenne	Wyoming
Northwest College	Powell	Wyoming
Sheridan College	Sheridan	Wyoming
Western Wyoming Community College	Rock Springs	Wyoming

== United States technical colleges with campus housing ==
College	City	State
Northwest Technical College	Bemidji	Minnesota
Hocking Technical College	Nelsonville	Ohio
Denmark Technical College	Denmark	South Carolina
Southeast Technical Institute	Sioux Falls	South Dakota
Western Technical College	La Crosse	Wisconsin
