= Michigan Community College Athletic Association =

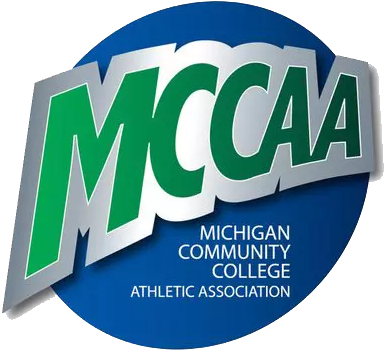
- Association: NJCAA
- Sports fielded: 14 (8 men's, 6 women's)
- Division: Region 12
- No. of teams: 24
- Region: Michigan and northern Indiana
- Website: mccaa.org

The Michigan Community College Athletic Association (MCCAA) is a junior college conference throughout Michigan and northern Indiana in Region 12 of the National Junior College Athletic Association (NJCAA).

The men's sports organized by the MCCAA are: soccer, cross country, basketball, baseball, bowling, wrestling and golf. The women's sports organized by the MCCAA are: volleyball, soccer, cross country, basketball, bowling, and softball.

== Member schools ==
=== Current members ===
The MCCAA currently has 24 full members, all but one are public schools:

Michigan Community College Athletic Association (MCCAA)
Location of MCCAA members
1 Alpena
2 Bay
3 Delta
4 Glen Oaks
5 Grand Rapids
6 Henry Ford
7 Jackson
8 Kalamazoo Valley
9 Kellogg
10 Kirtland
11 Lake Michigan
12 Lansing
13 Macomb
14 Marian–Plymouth
15 Mid Michigan
16 Montcalm
17 Mott
18 Muskegon
19 North Central
20 Oakland
21 Schoolcraft
22 SW Michigan
23 St. Clair County
24 Wayne County

Conference	Institution	Location	Founded	Affiliation	Enrollment	Nickname	Joined	Colors
Eastern Conference	Henry Ford College	Dearborn, Michigan	1938	Public (Note: Part of the Michigan Community College Association.)	5,000	Hawks	?	Royal Blue & White
Eastern Conference	Jackson College	Jackson, Michigan	1928	Public	7,700	Jets	?	Maroon & Old Gold
Eastern Conference	Macomb Community College	Warren, Michigan	1954	Public	22,000	Monarchs	?	Navy Blue & White
Eastern Conference	Mott Community College	Flint, Michigan	1923	Public	9,700	Bears	?	Black & Gold
Eastern Conference	Oakland Community College	Auburn Hills, Michigan	1964	Public	29,600	Owls	?	Green & White
Eastern Conference	Schoolcraft College	Livonia, Michigan	1961	Public	9,000	Ocelots	?	Blue & Gold
Eastern Conference	St. Clair County Community College	Port Huron, Michigan	1923	Public	2,394	Skippers	?	Navy Blue & Gold
Eastern Conference	Wayne County Community College	Detroit, Michigan	1967	Public	11,266	Wildcats	?	Blue & White
Northern Conference	Alpena Community College	Alpena, Michigan	1952	Public	1,250	Lumberjacks	?	Maroon & Gray
Northern Conference	Bay College (Note: Also known as Bay de Noc Community College.)	Escanaba, Michigan	1962	Public	1,800	Norse	?	Kelly Green & Royal Blue
Northern Conference	Delta College	University Center, Michigan	1961	Public	7,500	Ducks	?	Green & White
Northern Conference	Kirtland Community College	Grayling, Michigan	1966	Public	2,300	Firebirds	?	Dark Blue & Burgundy & Gray
Northern Conference	Mid Michigan College	Harrison, Michigan	1965	Public	2,508	Lakers	?	Blue & Sky Blue & Silver
Northern Conference	Montcalm Community College	Sidney, Michigan	1965	Public	1,600	Centurions	2022	Dark Green & Yellow
Northern Conference	Muskegon Community College	Muskegon, Michigan	1926	Public	4,166	Jayhawks	?	Royal Blue & Gold
Northern Conference	North Central Michigan College	Petoskey, Michigan	1958	Public	2,341	Timberwolves	?	Blue & Gold
Western Conference	Glen Oaks Community College	Centreville, Michigan	1967	Public	1,100	Vikings	?	Green & Gold
Western Conference	Grand Rapids Community College	Grand Rapids, Michigan	1914	Public	13,500	Raiders	?	Maize & Blue
Western Conference	Kalamazoo Valley Community College	Kalamazoo, Michigan	1966	Public	7,500	Cougars	?	Valley Blue & White
Western Conference	Kellogg Community College	Battle Creek, Michigan	1959	Public	9,935	Bruins	?	Blue & Silver
Western Conference	Lake Michigan College	Benton Harbor, Michigan	1946	Public	4,000	Red Hawks	?	Red & Gray & White
Western Conference	Lansing Community College	Lansing, Michigan	1957	Public	11,000	Stars	?	Blue & Silver & White
Western Conference	Marian University–Plymouth (Note: Was known as Marian University's Ancilla College from 2021 to 2026.)	Donaldson, Indiana	2021	Catholic (PHJC)	500	Chargers	2021	Royal Blue & Gold
Western Conference	Southwestern Michigan College	Dowagiac, Michigan	1964	Public	1,800	Roadrunners	?	Green & Gold

=== Former members ===
The MCCAA had one former full members, which was also a private school:

Institution	Location	Founded	Affiliation	Enrollment	Nickname	Joined	Left	Colors	Current conference
Ancilla College	Donaldson, Indiana	1966 (Note: Ancilla was founded in 1937, but did not start publicly admitting students until 1966.)	Catholic (PHJC)	N/A	Chargers	?	2021	Royal Blue & Gold	N/A (Note: Closed and merged with Marian University in 2021.)

== Sports sponsored ==
School	Baseball	Men's Basketball	Women's Basketball	Men's Bowling	Women's Bowling	Men's Cross Country	Women's Cross Country	Men's Golf	Men's Soccer	Women's Soccer	Softball	Volleyball	Wrestling	Total Men's Sports	Total Women's Sports	Total Sports
Alpena	✓	✓	✓	✗	✗	✓	✓	✗	✓	✓	✓	✓	✗	4	5	9
Bay	✓	✓	✓	✗	✗	✓	✓	✗	✗	✗	✓	✓	✗	3	4	7
Delta	✓	✓	✓	✗	✗	✗	✗	✓	✗	✓	✓	✓	✗	3	4	7
Glen Oaks	✓	✓	✓	✗	✗	✗	✗	✓	✗	✗	✓	✓	✗	3	3	6
Grand Rapids	✓	✓	✓	✗	✗	✓	✓	✓	✓	✓	✓	✓	✗	5	5	10
Henry Ford	✓	✓	✓	✗	✗	✗	✗	✓	✗	✗	✓	✓	✓	4	3	7
Jackson	✓	✓	✓	✓	✓	✓	✓	✓	✓	✓	✓	✓	✗	6	6	12
Kalamazoo Valley	✓	✓	✓	✗	✗	✗	✗	✗	✗	✗	✓	✓	✗	2	3	5
Kellogg	✓	✓	✓	✓	✓	✓	✓	✗	✗	✓	✗	✓	✗	4	5	9
Kirtland	✗	✓	✓	✓	✓	✓	✓	✓	✗	✗	✗	✓	✗	4	4	8
Lake Michigan	✓	✓	✓	✗	✗	✓	✓	✗	✓	✓	✓	✓	✗	4	5	9
Lansing	✓	✓	✓	✗	✗	✓	✓	✗	✗	✗	✓	✓	✗	3	4	7
Macomb	✓	✓	✓	✗	✗	✓	✓	✗	✗	✗	✓	✓	✗	3	4	7
Marian–Plymouth	✓	✓	✓	✓	✓	✓	✓	✓	✓	✓	✓	✓	✓	7	6	13
Mid Michigan	✓	✓	✓	✓	✓	✓	✗	✗	✗	✗	✓	✗	✗	4	4	8
Montcalm	✗	✓	✓	✓	✓	✓	✓	✓	✗	✗	✗	✓	✗	4	4	8
Mott	✓	✓	✓	✗	✗	✓	✓	✓	✗	✗	✓	✓	✓	5	4	9
Muskegon	✓	✓	✓	✓	✓	✓	✓	✓	✓	✓	✓	✓	✓	7	6	13
North Central	✗	✓	✓	✗	✗	✓	✓	✗	✗	✗	✗	✓	✗	2	3	5
Oakland	✗	✓	✓	✗	✗	✓	✓	✓	✗	✗	✓	✓	✗	3	4	7
Schoolcraft	✓	✓	✓	✓	✓	✓	✓	✓	✓	✓	✓	✓	✗	6	6	12
Southwestern Michigan	✗	✓	✓	✗	✗	✓	✓	✗	✗	✗	✗	✓	✓	3	3	6
St. Clair County	✓	✓	✓	✓	✓	✓	✓	✓	✗	✓	✓	✓	✓	6	6	12
Wayne County	✗	✓	✓	✓	✓	✓	✓	✓	✗	✗	✗	✗	✗	4	3	7
Totals	18	24	24	10	10	20	20	14	8	10	18	22	5	99	104	203

== See also ==
- Ohio Community College Athletic Conference, also in NJCAA Region 12
