= Scott Swedorski =

Scott A. Swedorski
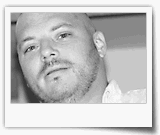
- Born: October 10, 1970 (age 54); Flint, Michigan
- Occupation: Software development & Marketing
- Website: CoffeeCup Software

Scott Swedorski is the founder of Tucows (The Ultimate Collection of Winsock Software), a large Internet domain name reseller, and Internet service provider.

== History ==
Scott served in the military and then received an associate degree from Mott Community College in Flint.

In 1993 he worked for the Flint Area Library Online Network (FALCON) Swedorski felt there was a need for public access to Internet-related software. Working from home, he created a site to provide the public with free and easily downloaded software.

In 2002, Swedorski received the lifetime achievement award from the Shareware Industry Awards Foundation (SIAF) for his work with shareware software authors.

Swedorski retired from Tucows in 2003 and launched a new software promotions company. He is also the Vice President of distribution and marketing at CoffeeCup Software, where he helped co-found the Organization of Independent Software Vendors. Scott also runs FileLight.com, a large shareware download site.
