= Mott Community College =

Public college in Flint, Michigan, U.S.

C.S. Mott Community College
- Mott Community College
- Former names: Flint Junior College (1923-c.1955); Flint Community Junior College (c.1955–1970); Genesee Community College (1970–1973)
- Motto: Ready For More!
- Type: Public community college
- Established: 1923
- Academic affiliations: MCCA, CNCCJC
- President: Beverly Walker-Griffea
- Administrative staff: 407 full-time; 421 part-time
- Students: 10,456
- Undergraduates: 10,456
- Location: Flint, Michigan, U.S. 43.0200°N 83.6725°W
- Campus: Flint with four suburban extension centers Clio, Fenton, Lapeer, and Howell, Michigan
- Colors: Black and gold
- Nickname: Bears
- Sporting affiliations: MCCAA; NJCAA
- Website: www.mcc.edu

Mott Community College (officially Charles Stewart Mott Community College or abbreviated MCC) is a public community college in Flint, Michigan. It is named for politician, businessman, and philanthropist Charles Stewart Mott. Its district is the same as the Genesee Intermediate School District and is governed by an elected board of trustees. The college offers 61 associate degrees and 40 pre-associate certificates. It also has satellite campuses in nearby Clio, Fenton, Lapeer, and Howell. The majority of students come from Genesee, Lapeer, and northwest Oakland County.

== History ==
Founded in 1923 by the City of Flint Board of Education, Flint Junior College held classes in Flint Central High School. In 1920, the school district purchased the Old Grove sanitarium plus 60 adjacent acres in 1920. With increased enrollment in the high school and junior college, the college moved in 1931 to the Oak Grove Campus.

In 1946 Charles Stewart Mott granted $1 million towards building a four-year college. A development committee was started based on the offer for future funding of a College and Cultural Center with more than $30 million pledged by the early 1960s. This funded a new campus on 32 acres (130,000 m^{2}) of donated Applewood Estate land. The first building constructed in 1954 was The Ballenger Field House. This campus opened in 1955. By that time, the college's name was Flint Community Junior College. The college was turned into a county-wide institution with a referendum and millage proposal passing the voters in 1969. To reflect this, Flint Community Junior College was renamed Genesee Community College on July 5, 1970. In 1973, it was renamed to Charles Stewart Mott College after the death of C.S. Mott.

=== Presidents ===
- Richard Shaink
- Beverly Walker-Griffea 2014-2024

== Athletics ==
MCC's sports teams are called the Bears. Their Men's Basketball team won the 2003, 2007, 2008, and 2012 national NJCAA Men's Division II Basketball Championship games. In 2001, 2004, and 2011 they were the division runners-up.

== Notable alumni ==
- John Jasinski, former Northwest Missouri State University president
- Clarence Leonard "Kelly" Johnson, aircraft engineer and aeronautical innovator who organized the Lockheed Skunk Works
- Donald Riegle, US Senator
- Woodrow Stanley, politician
- Scott Swedorski, founder of Tucows and Vice President of distribution and marketing at CoffeeCup Software
- Justus Thigpen, basketball player, first NBA player from Flint. Played for Pittsburgh Pipers, as well as the Detroit Pistons and Kansas City-Omaha Kings.
- Terrence Watson (born 1987), American-Israeli basketball player for Hapoel Eilat of the Israeli Premier League
