= CoffeeCup HTML Editor =

Web development software

- Developer: CoffeeCup Software
- Release: August 1996
- Stable release: 18.0.890 / 2022
- Operating system: Windows XP, Windows Vista, Windows 7, Windows 10
- Type: HTML editor
- License: Freemium trialware
- Website: coffeecup.com/html-editor/

CoffeeCup HTML Editor is an HTML editor developed by CoffeeCup Software. Originally created by Nicholas Longo and Kevin Jurica, it was first released to the public in August 1996. It was often compared to HotDog, a simple HTML editor that competed with HoTMetaL. Until version 12.5 released in 2012, it was capable of WYSIWYG editing; as of 2023 WYSIWYG editing has not returned to the software. A companion program called CoffeeCup HTML Editor was offered as a purely text-based HTML editor from the onset.
