= Lake Michigan College =

Community college in Berrien County, Michigan, U.S.

Coordinates: 42°05′49.9″N 86°23′34.5″W

- Motto: We Connect You to Your Future...
- Type: Public community college
- Established: 1946
- President: Trevor Kubatzke
- Location: Benton Township, Michigan, United States
- Campus: Rural, Suburban
- Colors: Red and gray
- Nickname: Red Hawks
- Website: www.lakemichigancollege.edu

Lake Michigan College is a public community college in Berrien County, Michigan. The main campus is in Benton Township, Michigan with regional campuses in Niles and South Haven.

== History ==
Lake Michigan College was founded as Benton Harbor Junior College in 1946 within the city of Benton Harbor when voters approved an initiative to create a junior college. In 1954, Benton Harbor Junior College was redesigned into the Benton Harbor Community College and Technical Institute (CCTI). In 1963, a vote in Berrien County was held and affirmed to plan to create a county college district. A tax of up to one mill was approved for operation and building needs and a six-person board of trustees was established as the governing body of the college. CCTI was renamed again in 1964 to Lake Michigan College. Construction on the Napier Avenue Campus, which is now the main campus, began in 1965 when the board of trustees approved the purchase of a 259-acre (1.05 km^{2}) parcel of land in Benton Township.

== Campuses ==
The college operates between three campuses: the main campus, located off Napier Avenue in Benton Harbor, the Niles Campus at Bertrand Crossing, and the South Haven campus. Classes are also offered at several off-campus locations and online. While primarily a commuter campus throughout its history, LMC began construction of the college's first on-campus residence hall, Beckwith Hall, at the Napier Avenue campus in the summer of 2013; Beckwith Hall opened in July 2014.

A Siena Heights University satellite campus is housed at the Benton Harbor campus, although Western Michigan University has transferred ownership of the building which housed its Southwest extension over to Lake Michigan College; this building is now known as the Todd Center, and houses the Business, Computer Science and Education departments as of Fall 2018.

The South Haven campus was completed in 2003 after South Haven School District residents voted to join the Lake Michigan College district, the M-TEC training facility was completed in 2000 and the Bertrand Crossing campus in 1998. After a proposed millage failed, the board of trustees put the M-TEC facility up for sale in 2008. In January 2015, Lake Michigan College sold the 44,000 square foot M-TEC building to the Whirlpool Corporation. Programs previously housed at the M-TEC facility were relocated to the Hanson Technology Center, which opened to the public at the Napier Avenue campus in the fall of 2016. The campus consolidations should save Lake Michigan College money through operational efficiencies.

The Welch Center for Wine & Viticulture opened on the main campus in 2019.

== Athletics ==
Lake Michigan College is a member of the NJCAA Region 12 and the Michigan Community College Athletic Association Western Division. The college's athletic teams were known as the "Indians" from 1946 until 2012, representing the school's longtime connection to the Pokagon Band of Potawatomi Indians of southwest Michigan. In February 2012, after several college staff and student meetings with the Pokagon Tribal Council, it was announced that the school would adopt a new team nickname in an effort put forward by student leaders to increase school spirit and mascot visibility while still honoring the historical connection to the Pokagon. On April 24, 2012, the college officially announced "Red Hawks" as its new team name for all sports, inspired by the red-tailed hawk which appears on the flag of the Pokagon Nation.

Lake Michigan College sponsors men's and women's basketball, baseball, softball, volleyball, and men's and women's soccer teams as well as club sports. The women's basketball team finished the 2011–2012 season as the #2 ranked team in the country and are eighth in total NJCAA appearances, the most of any MCCAA team. The men's basketball team placed 7th in the nation in 2005.

LMC's mascot is Rocky the Red Hawk, who debuted in 2012. The school's biggest rivals are the Kalamazoo Valley Community College Cougars and the Ancilla College Chargers.

The school won its first national championship in 2023 when women's cross country runner Olivia Ippel won the NJCAA Division II National Championship with a time of 17:56.6 for a 5K race.

== Notable alumni ==
- Eric Thompson, professional basketball player
- Maureen Bauer, member of the Indiana House of Representatives
- Duane Below, professional baseball player
