= Kirtland Community College =

Public college in Grayling, Michigan, US

- Motto: Be the future
- Type: Public community college
- Established: 1966
- President: Gary Roberts
- Location: Grayling, Michigan, United States; 44.602°N 84.706°W
- Campus: Rural
- Colors
- Nickname: Firebirds
- Website: www.kirtland.edu

Kirtland Community College is a public community college in Grayling, Michigan.

== History ==
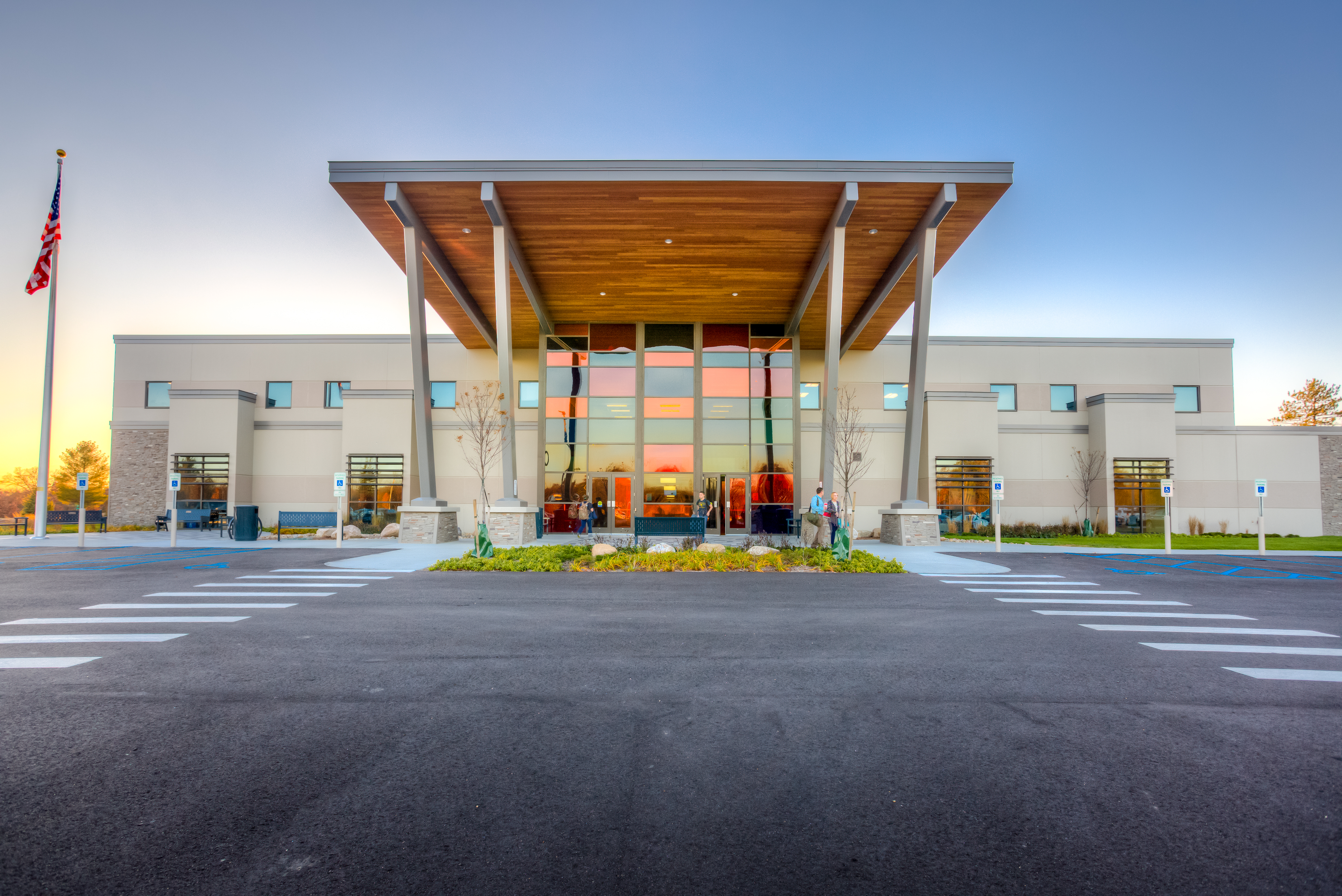
Kirtland Community College front entrance in Grayling, MI.

Established in 1966, Kirtland Community College was created by a vote of six local school districts: Crawford-AuSable, Fairview Area, Gerrish-Higgins, Houghton Lake, Mio-AuSable, and West Branch-Rose City. Established under the provisions of Michigan's Public Act 188 of 1955, it is the state's largest community college district geographically, encompassing 2,500 square miles (6,500 km2) and serving all or part of nine counties: Ogemaw, Oscoda, Roscommon, and Crawford, as well as areas of five other counties. Approximately 65,000 residents within the district are served by Kirtland. The college began operations in 1968 with five portable classrooms and an initial enrollment of 160 students. Named in honor of the Kirtland's warbler, it has grown to become a significant educational institution in the region.

Kirtland's new central campus was built in 2016, which houses the health and science programs. In addition, Kirtland maintains classrooms and community spaces in Gaylord, Michigan.

== Academics ==
Kirtland offers 49 degrees and certificates for its students. This includes transfer associate degrees and areas of study in arts and sciences, business, professional programs, industrial trades, health science, public safety, and more. The ASA (Associate in Science and Arts) allows students to complete their basic classes at Kirtland. If students choose to take in-person classes most of the classes are located at the main campus in Grayling. However, some are available in Gaylord and at high school campuses for dual-enrolled students. The college also offers a concurrent BSN-RN pathway in partnership with Saginaw Valley State University and Grand Valley State University in 2024.

=== Accreditation ===
The college is accredited by the Higher Learning Commission. The college also holds membership in the Michigan Community College Association and the American Association of Community Colleges. The North Central Association of Colleges and Schools, the predecessor to the Higher Learning Commission, granted Kirtland Community College status as a candidate for accreditation in 1972 and the college has been accredited as an associate degree-granting institution since 1975. Specific programs at the college are accredited by program-specific accreditors, including the surgical technology program accredited by the Commission on Accreditation of Allied Health Education Programs (CAAHEP), the associate of science in nursing program accredited by the National League for Nursing Commission for Nursing Education Accreditation (NLN-CNEA), and the medical assisting programs approved by the American Medical Technologist Association (AMT).

== Athletics ==
The college competes in intercollegiate athletics as a member of the Northern Conference of the Michigan Community College Athletic Association. The Kirtland Firebirds compete in men's golf and men and women's cross-country running. There is also pickle-ball available to play in the event center, paddles being picked up from the library. Kirtland has half- to full-ride scholarships available. In 2015, Kirtland added bowling to their athletics department. In 2022, Kirtland added men's and women's basketball to their athletics department. E-sports has been their latest addition including Overwatch, Super Smash Bros and Mariokart. The Kirtland Firebirds have their home sport areas located a few miles from campus at Hanson Hills for cross country, Hi Skore Lanes in West Branch for their bowling team and the Grayling country club for their golf team. The boys and girls Firebird basketball players play at home in their more recently built gym at the Thomas Quinn Event Center. The Thomas Quinn Event Center features three complete basketball courts, two of which are multipurpose material. Around the three courts runs a 200-meter track for walking or running. The event center also features four locker rooms and a weight room. The Event Center is available to Kirtland students for free.

The Kirtland Firebirds compete in cross-country, golf and bowling in the MCCAA (Michigan Community College Athletic Association), and go head-to-head with four-year universities in Michigan and Ohio in regional competitions and at the national level for the NJCAA (National Junior College Athletics Association) Division II.

Firebirds have earned Academic All-American and All-American status, and teams have recently ranked in the top 10 nationally for academic success, while traveling to National Championship competitions in places like Garden City, Kansas and Lansing, Michigan. From top-tier recruits to walk-ons, all our student-athletes earn scholarships, and Firebirds have a track record of transferring to join teams at four-year universities.

With home sport areas in Grayling at Hanson Hills, at Hi Skore Lanes in West Branch and at the Graying Country Club golf course, there is plenty of opportunities in the region for fans to attend matches and support our student-athletes.

The Kirtland Esports Club is the forum at Kirtland for researching and promoting online and competitive esports gaming. With the goal to build community and student growth, the Esports Club will provide a venue for Kirtland students to socialize, form teams for intercollegiate tournaments, and develop the future Firebird Esports Varsity Team. From competitive gaming to streaming production and shoutcasting, the Kirtland Esports Club will be crucial in the success of esports at Kirtland.

Kirtland Community College offers a 5K Run at the Grayling Campus. Walk or run around with your fellow Firebirds. Those who attend will be treated to a healthy potluck meal following the activity.
