= Kellogg Community College =

Public college in Battle Creek, Michigan, US

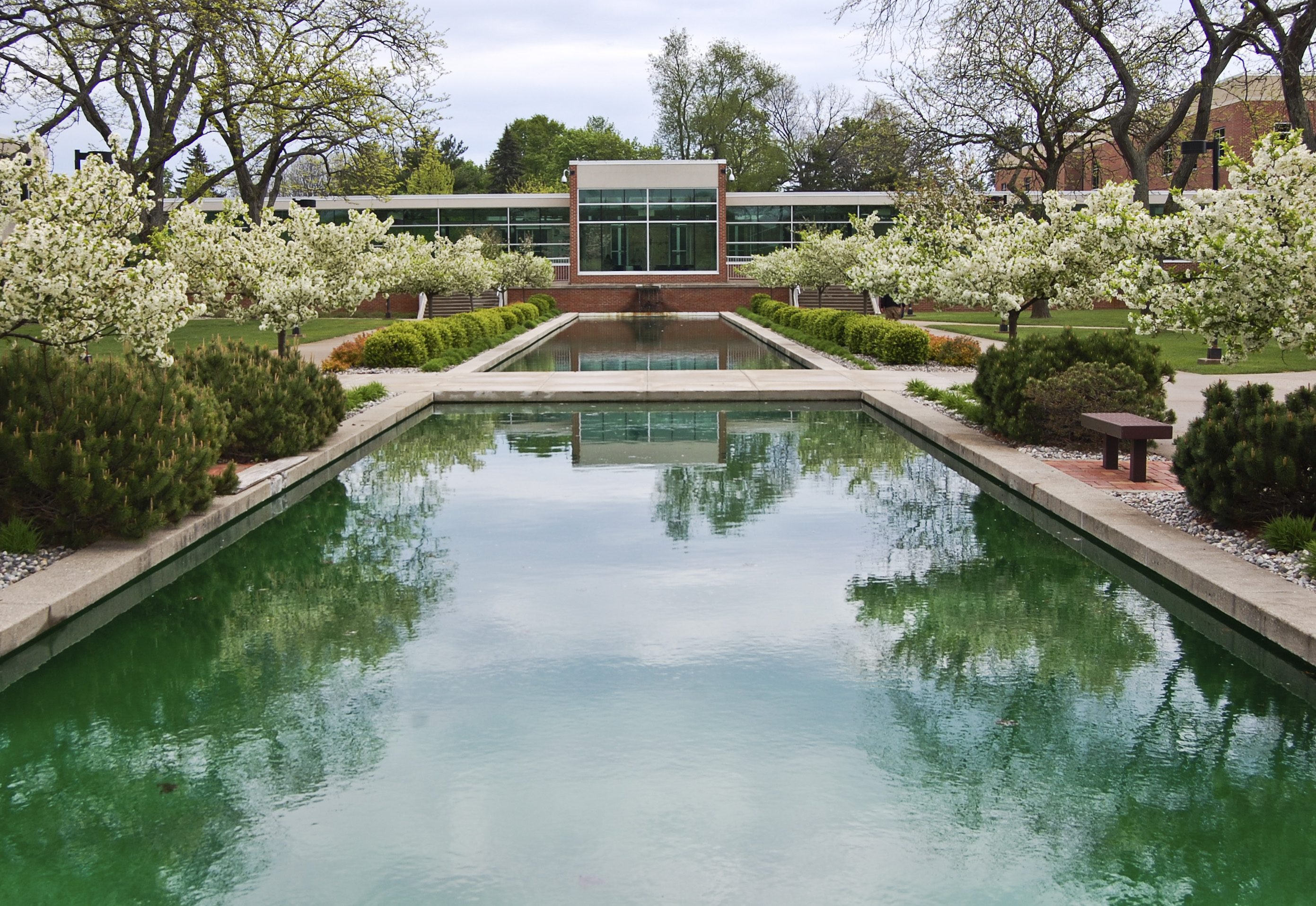
- Other name: KCC
- Type: Public community college
- Established: 1956; 70 years ago
- President: Dr. Paul Watson II
- Students: 8,400 annually
- Location: Battle Creek, Michigan, U.S. 42.3349°N 85.1772°W
- Campus: Battle Creek with regional centers in Albion, Hastings, Coldwater
- Colors: Blue and gray
- Mascot: Bruins
- Website: www.kellogg.edu

Kellogg Community College (KCC) is a public community college based in Battle Creek, Michigan, with sites in Battle Creek, Albion, Coldwater, Hastings and in the Fort Custer Industrial Park. It serves approximately 8,400 students annually via five campuses, customized training, and online coursework.

The KCC service district covers Barry, Branch and Calhoun counties in south central Michigan. The tax district includes most of Calhoun County and small portions of Barry, Branch, Hillsdale, Kalamazoo and St. Joseph counties. KCC, a nonprofit institution, is governed by a publicly elected Board of Trustees, which sets policy and budgeting priorities.

== Academics ==
KCC is accredited by the Higher Learning Commission. The college offers 59 pre-professional transfer curricula; 35 associate degree programs; 28 certificate programs; six categories of professional certifications; and a variety of short-term, non-credit courses.

== Athletics ==
Kellogg Community College offers six athletics programs including baseball, men's and women's basketball, men's and women's bowling, men's and women's cross country, women's soccer and women's volleyball. The teams compete as members of the Michigan Community College Athletic Association and Region 12 of the National Junior College Athletic Association (NJCAA).

== Freedom of speech controversy ==
On September 2016, three individuals were arrested after handing out copies of the U.S. Constitution on campus, the students were told to shut down the event on grounds that it violated the school's “speech permit policy" and were subsequently arrested by campus police for trespassing.

The YAL Organization subsequently filed a lawsuit and the school agreed to pay a $55,000 settlement.

== Notable alumni ==
- Josh McDowell, Christian apologist and evangelist
- Lance Barber, actor
