= Southwestern Michigan College =

Community college near Dowagiac, Michigan, US

- Motto: Knowledge for All
- Type: Public community college
- Established: 1964
- President: Klint Pleasant
- Students: 2000 (fall 2024)
- Location: Dowagiac, Michigan, United States; 41.9658°N 86.0826°W
- Campus: Dowagiac with one satellite campus (Niles)
- Sporting affiliations: NJCAA – MCCAA
- Mascot: Ronnie Roadrunner
- Website: swmich.edu

Southwestern Michigan College is a public community college with its main campus near Dowagiac, Michigan. It also has a campus just outside the city limits of Niles, Michigan.

== History ==
Southwestern Michigan College was founded on November 19, 1964 after the voters of Cass County, Michigan approved a $1.5 million tax levy to fund a Cass County Community College. The name of the college was voted on and adopted by the board of trustees and approved in March 1965. On September 12, 1965, ground was broken for the main campus in Dowagiac, Michigan, the ground breaking was at the site of the arts building. Classes began at Southwestern Michigan College in September 1966. In April 1966 the college already had enrolled 175 students before the buildings were completed, with the expected first class to be 240 students. By August the college had passed that goal and had 295 Students enrolled. On September 11 the colleges enrollment was 335 students. The local ratio of area high school graduates attending college in Cass county changed from one of the lowest in the state to one of the highest. In its second year of operation, the college had over 800 students and was projecting enrollment by 1972 to hit 1,800 students.

The college is located three miles (5 km) outside of Dowagiac, Michigan city limits. The first president of the college was Nathan Ivey. After in taking the job, his wife, the Latin teacher in Rangely, Colorado, taught Latin class over the phone.

When the campus opened it was located on 160-acre campus. One of the first endowed scholarships given to the college was from the Nineteenth Century Club of $5,000 for an endowed scholarship for female students. Applications for the first class of students at the college were opened on July 1, 1965. The Municipal Finance Commission approved the $1.5 million bond that voters had approved, allowing the college to fund early operation and capital investment. The bond was a 28-year bond with a maximum issue of 4%.

The lowest bid on building the main buildings the new library arts and science was from Eisenhauer Construction Company of Marshall, Michigan for $675,500. After the board awarded the contract, the contractor notified the board of $100,000 error in their bid, refused to sign the contract, and asked to be released. Ed Eisenhauer asked to be released and a return of the 5% bond that had to be placed on the bid. Because of the dispute, the board had to award the contact to the second lowest bid of $739,600 from Cosnick Construction Company of Benton Harbor, Michigan. Eisenhauer Construction Company filed litigation against the college.

The state assistant superintended Ferris Crawford issued a quote saying that "Cass County Community College District has an inadequate tax bases and is in financial trouble." In just days he walked back that remark saying it "was inaccurate, taken out of context and incomplete. Southwestern Michigan College District is not in financial trouble. It has a well-founded construction plan which will be adequate for many years."

The first bursar of the college was Maxine Lyle, who prior to being brought on to run the college's financial office was office manager of Dowagiac Union High School. Francis Hiscok became the first dean of vocational education. Donald L. Newport was named the college dean. In April 1966 the first 8 faculty members were hired by the board. Mary Eileen Parks was named director of the practical nursing department.

In October 1966, the board awarded a contract to Gosnick Construction Company to build the vocational technical building for $243,000.00. In July 1967, the board offered Ivey a three-year contract with a salary of $21,000 per year.

The family of Jennie Wells File established a library fund for the college. Before the new vocation building could open in 1967, the buildings was burglarized and $5,000 of tools were stolen which included "valve grinders, battery chargers, car jacks and" other tools.

=== State retirement benefits exclusions ===
In February 2018, the Michigan Office of the Auditor General investigated Southwestern Michigan College for intentionally excluding part-time student employees from enrollment into Michigan Publics School Employees' Retirement System. Although then-president David Mathews and the board of trustees filed a lawsuit against the state attempting to challenge the "constitutional authority" of the state office to audit community colleges, the Michigan Court of Claims dismissed the case. The college appealed the case to the Michigan Court of Appeals, but the case was sent back to the court of claims. The college withdrew the litigation in January 2019. The case was started when an anonymous complaint of "fraud, waste and abuse" on March 4, 2017. The Michigan Office of Retirement Services started its own investigation and found the college could owe up to $10.4 million for improperly/intentionally excluding up to 500 part-time students from the system.

The Office of the Audit General alleged that emails from 2015 "unequivocally demonstrated that current administrators communicated the college's noncompliance to the president," who signed the certification forms, the report said." Then-president Mathews stated "We were aware that we were not putting part-time students into the retirement system, but we were under the impression that that was the correct way to handle those part-time students whose predominant relationship with the college was that of a student.""

The college was one of 16 of the 28 community colleges in the state that were treating student works as students not as employees. The state legislature issued a fix in Public Act 328 of 2018 which ended the dispute. It clarified that part-time student workers should not be in the state retirement system. Public Act 512 of 2018 dealt with what to do about the past issues prior to the passing of Public Act 328 which made the issue clear. Under Public Act 512 clarified that $257,569 is what was due to the state from the college, only $210,000 in past retirement contributions, the rest was late fees and interest.

=== Presidents ===
There have been nine presidents of Southwestern Michigan College.

	Name	Year started	Year ended	Source
1st	Nathan Ivey	1965	1968	
2nd	Raymond A. Pietak	1968	1969	
3rd	Stanley J. Hergenroeder	1969	1971	
4th	Russell M. Owen	1971	1981	
5th	David C. Briegel	1981	1998	
6th	Marshal Bishop	1998	2001	
7th	David Mathews	2001	2019	
8th	Joe Odenwald	2019	2025	
9th	Klint Pleasant	2025		

== Academics ==
Offering both on-campus and hybrid learning options, the college is accredited by the Higher Learning Commission. It offers Associate in Arts, Associate in Science, and Associate in Applied Science degrees as well as certificate programs. SMC also offers bachelor's degrees on the Dowagiac campus through a partnership with Ferris State University, allowing students to take three years of classes at SMC's low tuition and pay only one year of the university's tuition. Additionally, the college has partnered with Michigan State University to help students earn an MSU certificate while also working toward an associate degree. SMC also has articulation agreements with many other four-year universities.

== Athletics ==
In the early 1970s SMC had a strong intercollegiate athletics program, gaining national recognition for cross-country. The cross-country team won five NJCAA national championships (1973, 1974, 1975, 1979, 1981) and 23 Michigan Community College Athletics Association (MCCAA) championships. It produced three Hall of Fame runners, a Hall of Fame coach (Ron Gunn) and 41 All-Americans. SMC has also won four national championships in the marathon (1979, 1983, 1990, 1991) and the 1994 women’s basketball Division II national championship, for a total of 10 overall. Intercollegiate athletics were disbanded in 1997. However, men’s and women’s cross country returned in the fall of 2021, and in 2022 SMC added men’s basketball, women’s basketball, women’s volleyball, and men’s wrestling. Since 2022, women's wrestling and men's and women's track and field was also added.

Intramural and club sports have been an active aspect of campus life throughout the college's history, and in 2022, the college added bass fishing and esports teams, both of which compete on the national level.

== Main campus ==
The main campus houses 10 buildings:

- Jan and A.C Kairis Building
- Barbara Wood Building
- Charles O. Zollar Building (Student Activity Center)
- Dale A. Lyons Building
- Foster W. Daugherty Building
- Fred L. Mathews Library and Conference Center
- Keith H. McKenzie Hall (Student Housing)
- William M. White Hall (Student Housing)
- Thomas F. Jerdon Hall (Student Housing)
- David C. Briegel Building
- William P.D. O'Leary Building

=== Student Activity Center ===
The Student Activity Center (SAC) in the Charles O. Zollar Building houses a fitness center, rock climbing wall, café, student theatre, and game room complete with pool, foosball, ping pong, arcade games, and video games. All student facilities and events are free for all students. Community members can also buy memberships or day passes to the fitness center.

The SAC is also home to the 1st Source Bank Fieldhouse that serves as home to the SMC Roadrunners and seats 525 fans. It includes the McLoughlin Family Foundation Suite, a second-floor suite that houses athletic offices and the SMC Sports Medicine Center.

== Satellite campus ==
In July 1992 the Niles Campus opened with a new 25,000-square-foot (2,300 m^{2}) facility, located just outside the city limits of Niles, Michigan. In 1999 a 22,000-square-foot (2,000 m^{2}) addition was completed, which came close to doubling the size of the Niles Campus. In 2001 a 14,000-square-foot (1,300 m^{2}) Michigan Technology Center was added. Named for a former Michigan state senator, this building is known as the Harry T. Gast Building.
