= Bay College =

Community college in Michigan, U.S.

- Type: Public community college
- Established: 1962
- President: Nerita L. Hughes
- Students: 2,414 degree-seeking 5,000 total
- Location: Escanaba, Michigan, United States; 45.7718°N 87.0859°W
- Campus: Rural
- Colors: Green and blue
- Nickname: Norse
- Sporting affiliations: NJCAA Region XIII, MCCAA
- Website: www.baycollege.edu

Bay de Noc Community College (Bay College) is a public community college in Escanaba, Michigan. Founded in 1962, the college has a main campus in Escanaba and another 25-acre (0.10 km^{2}) campus, Bay College West, in Iron Mountain, Michigan, serving Dickinson County.

== Academics ==
The college offers several certificate programs, as well as programs for two-year Associate Degrees; Associate in Arts (AA), Associate in Science (AS), Associate in Applied Science (AAS). Bay College is also home of the first Michigan Technical Education Center (M-Tec), which offers training and development courses. Together, the college and M-Tec host over 40,000 visits each year. In 2016, Bay College was awarded a grant from Achieving the Dream (ATD), which uses Open Educational Resources (OER).

== Athletics ==
As of 2017, Bay College Norse Athletics offers Men's and Women's basketball and Men's and Women's cross country, and competes in the MCCAA.

== Notable alumni ==
- Chad Hord, professional off-road racing driver
- Josh Parisian, UFC mixed martial artist
- Travis Wiltzius, head football coach at Finlandia

== Images ==
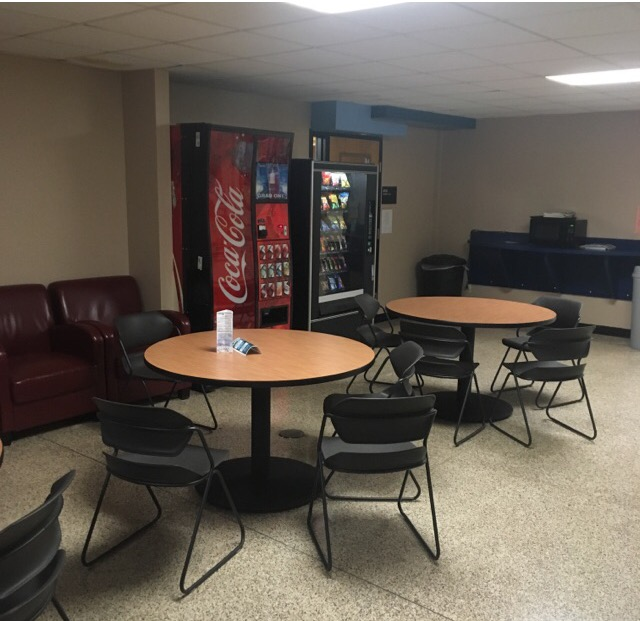
The lounge near the chem labs at bay

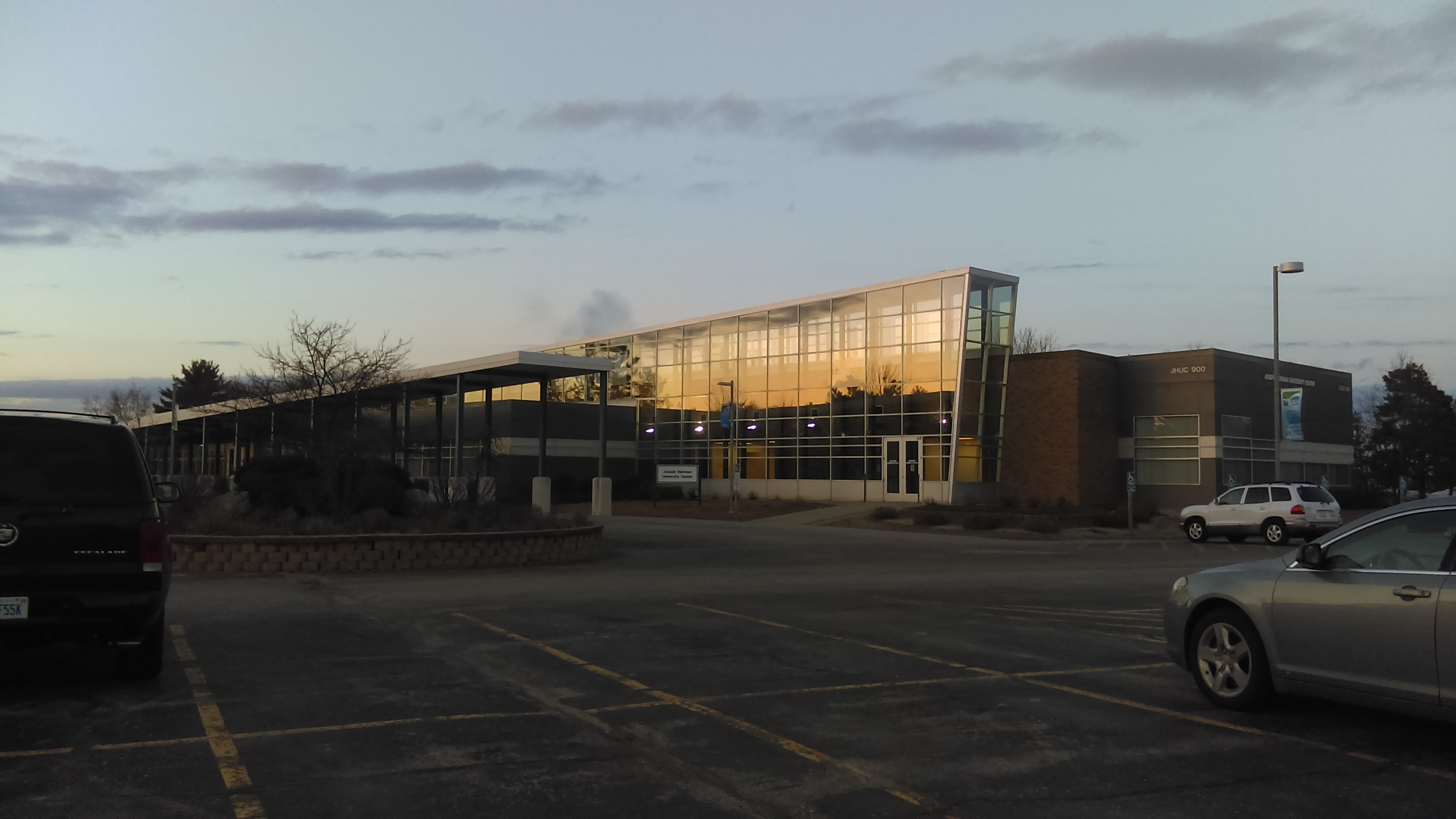
Bay College's JHUC at dusk

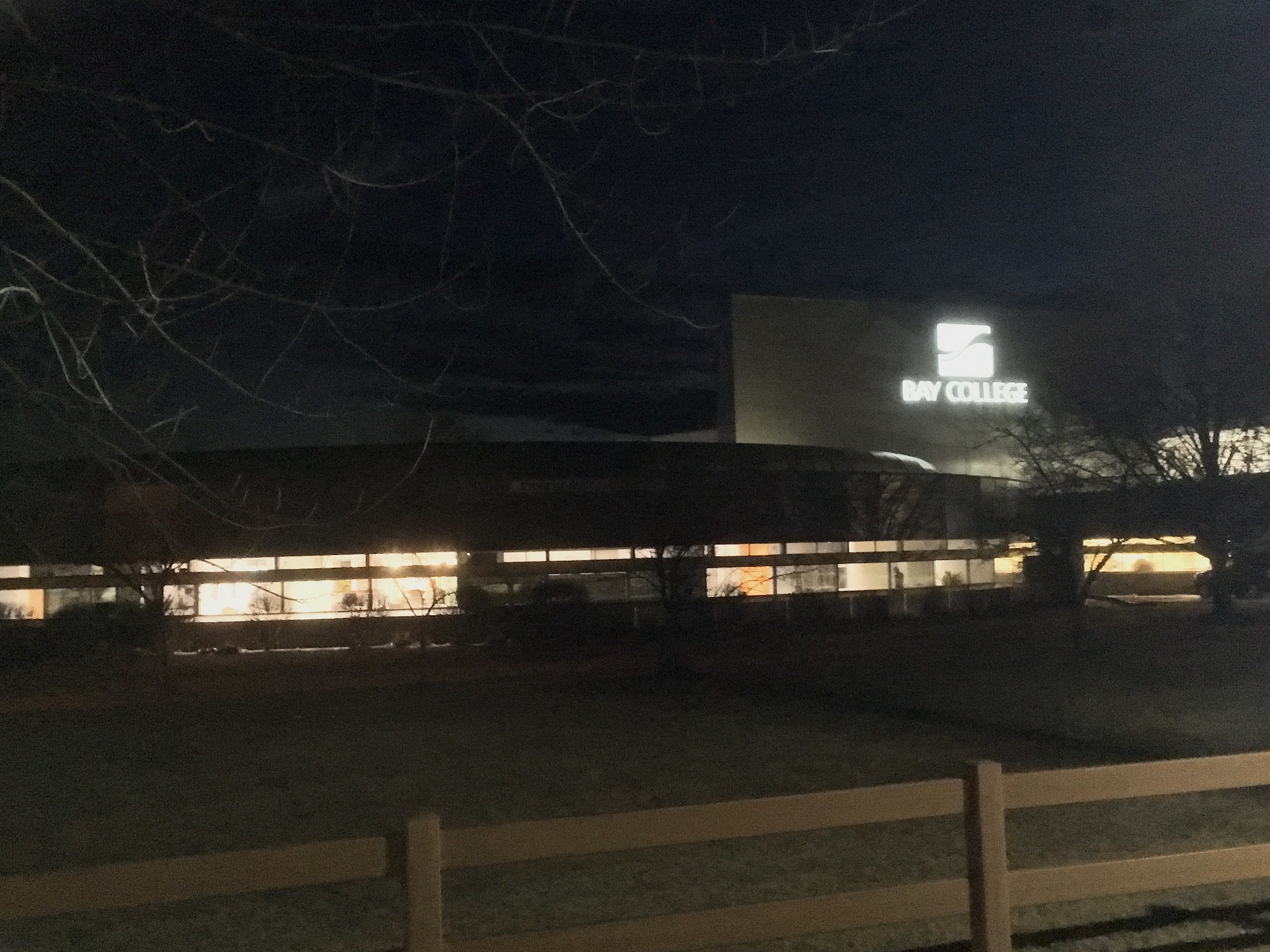
Bay College HUB Building, nighttime

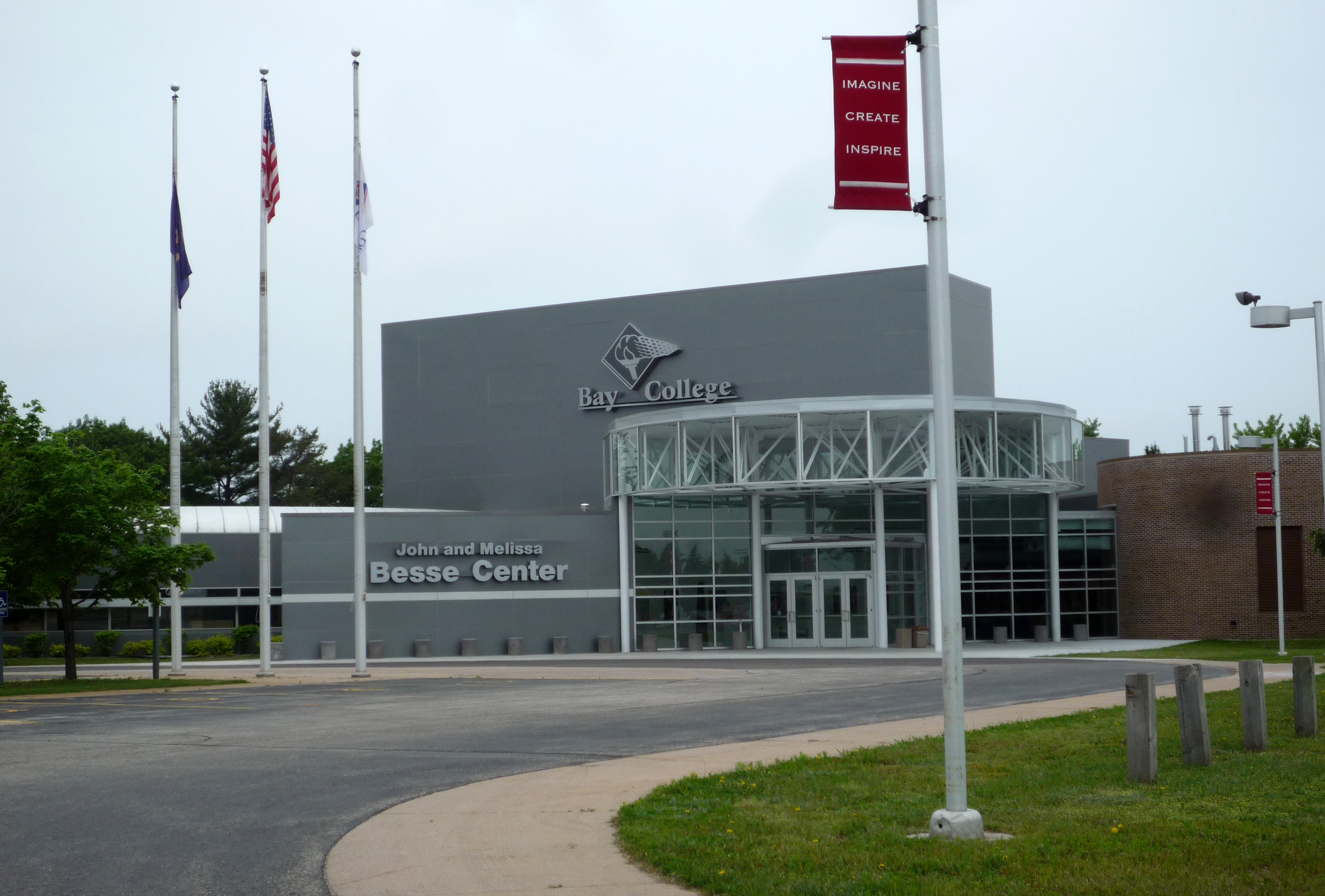
Besse Center Theater

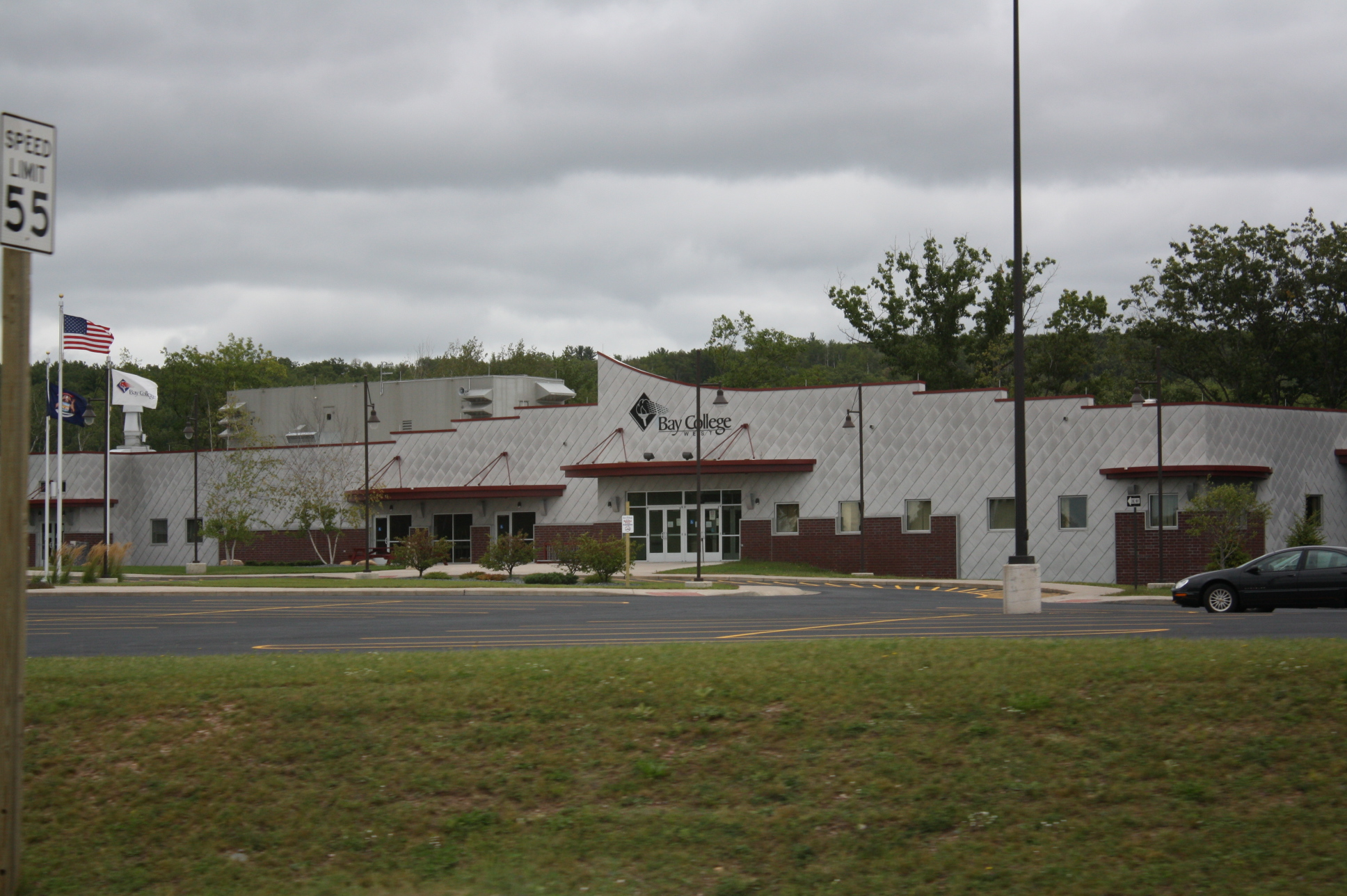
Bay College West, Iron Mountain
