= CoffeeCup Software =

American software development company

CoffeeCup Software Incorporated
- Company type: Private
- Industry: Software
- Founded: Corpus Christi, Texas (1996)
- Headquarters: Atlanta, Georgia, U.S.
- Key people: Hans Top, Director; Bob Visser, COO; Alberto Fernández González, Chief Technology Officer
- Products: See complete products listing.
- Number of employees: 10 (March 2018)

CoffeeCup Software is an American computer software development company based in Atlanta, Georgia, United States, founded in Corpus Christi, Texas, in 1996. The name comes from the company's origins in an internet cafe owned by its founder.

The company develops software applications for creating, designing, and editing responsive websites and a number of online services for webmasters. The company's third product, CoffeeCup Direct FTP, was the first FTP program to incorporate text editing functionality directly into the interface in a "split-screen" fashion.

In the spring of 2007, CoffeeCup moved to its new headquarters where it employs just over 10 programmers and designers. In addition to a panel of user-advisers, CoffeeCup has a group of around 8000 “Ambassadors” who are invited to test drive new and existing software programs and report bugs and offer suggestions for improvements.

CoffeeCup's Software has won the Shareware Industry Award six years running from 1999 to 2004 for the CoffeeCup HTML Editor. Other awards include being ranked #400 in the Interactive 500, 11 CNet Editors Choice Awards, 18 Tucows 5-Star Awards, and ZDNet Best Pick for Web Design Software.

== History ==
CoffeeCup Software was started in a coffee house called “The Raven & The Sparrow” which was owned by the company's founder, Nicholas Longo. This was the only coffee house that offered free internet access in Corpus Christi, Texas, at the time.

Since the coffee house already had the www.coffeecup.com domain name, the fledgling software company was named CoffeeCup Software and the first program was named CoffeeCup HTML Editor. Longo posted the program on his website. Eventually, CoffeeCup began charging US$20 for the program. In 1996 Longo decided to put away the espresso machines and devote full-time attention to developing software.

CoffeeCup offers a core group of programs free to schools. CoffeeCup Software's K–12 Donation Program allows public schools to request the Educational Software Package (ESP) Free for classroom use to elementary and secondary public schools, and public libraries.

== Products ==
- CoffeeCup HTML Editor
- Responsive Email Designer
- Responsive Site Designer
- CSS Grid Builder
- Foundation Framer
- Bootstrap Builder
- Responsive Layout Maker Pro
- Website Insight
- Places
- Direct FTP
- Web Form Builder
- Animation Studio
- Web Editor - OS X
- Web Form Builder - OS X
- Image Mapper
- Website Color Schemer
- Google SiteMapper
- Website Access Manager
- Image Mapper
- CoffeeCup Free HTML Editor
- CoffeeCup Free Zip Wizard
- CoffeeCup Free Image Viewer
- CoffeeCup Free FTP 4.0
- CoffeeCup Free DHTML Menu Builder
- CoffeeCup LockBox
