= Alpena Community College =

Two-year college in Alpena, Michigan, U.S.

- Alpena Community College logo
- Motto: Discover the value of an ACC education
- Type: Public community college
- Established: 1952
- Endowment: $3.3 million
- President: Dr. Donald MacMaster
- Academic staff: 125
- Students: Approximately 2,000
- Location: Alpena, Michigan, U.S. 45.0805°N 83.4451°W
- Campus: Small town, 700 acres (280 ha)
- Colors: Burgundy and white
- Sporting affiliations: ACHA, MCCAA, NJCAA
- Mascot: The Lumberjack
- Website: www.alpenacc.edu

Alpena Community College (ACC) is a public community college in Alpena, Michigan. It was founded in 1952. The college has a 700-acre (280 ha) main campus in Alpena and another campus, Huron Shores, located in Wurtsmith Air Force Base in Oscoda, Michigan.

The college offers associate's degrees to students in the arts, general studies, science, and applied science; and one Bachelor of Science degree in Electrical Systems Technology. There are also certificate programs in twenty concentrations and cooperative programs with seven universities and three community colleges.

== Description ==
Alpena Community College is run on a semester schedule. Students are offered classes on campus and a multitude of online classes. The fall semester generally starts in the middle of August and the spring semester starts at the beginning of January. Summer classes are only six weeks long and can be started in the middle of May or at the end of June. Alpena also offers a dual enrollment program for qualified high school students, who can attend classes on campus or online.

Alpena Community College is a small, quiet college that offers several transferable programs. Before attending Alpena Community College a student should speak with a counselor to figure out which college would accept the credits from ACC. ACC offers a 2+2 bachelor's degree program in Nursing. A student usually attends Alpena Community College for two years and then attends Ferris State University for the other two years. The future student must obtain a 2.0 grade point average in order for any credits to transfer. However, there are several other colleges that offer transferable degrees. Just like any other college, Alpena Community College offers all the courses that prepare a student for the nursing program and helps accelerate the student for an internship.

== Programs ==
=== Sports ===
- Alpena Community College offers volleyball, basketball, and softball for women.
- The College offers cross country, baseball, and basketball for men.
- Alpena Community College is a part of the National Junior College Athletic Association (Region XII) and the Northern Conference of the Michigan Community College Athletic Association (MCCAA).

=== Art directors program ===
ACC has a Fine Arts Program. Right now nearly 60 percent of people who are in the art field are self-employed. Art directors make up the largest category of all artists, coming up with new designs and ways to present these designs. Art directors work on websites, articles, newspapers, and digital media. They look over this material to develop a design for publications. Usually art directors are in charge of the visual. The art directors work a normal work week, usually in offices at a firm or company. Some art directors are self-employed, and therefore they make their own work schedule and deadlines.

=== Psychology (Associate in Science) ===
This degree is intended for students who want to work in the psychology field, are pursuing an Associate in Science (AS) degree, or want to transfer to obtain a bachelor's or advanced degree in psychology. It stresses mathematics and biological factors in psychological phenomena. It can provide a foundation for clinical psychology, cognitive psychology, experimental psychology, forensic psychology, health psychology, physiological psychology, and neuropsychology. A minimum of 60 credits is needed for the Associate in Science degree.

=== Pre-Medicine (Associate in Science) ===
This degree is suitable for students going into pre-dental or pre-medical studies. This program can be altered depending on the need of any particular student, so a consultation with an academic advisor is required. A minimum of 60 credits is needed for the Associate in Science degree.

=== Business Management AAS (Associate in Applied Science) ===
This degree is for students who want to work in the business industry or manage their own businesses. The curriculum combines general education courses with business operations and management.

=== Concrete Technology ===
This course features a two year program where students learn fundamental understanding of the technology of concrete. Concrete technology at ACC is one of the original associate degree curriculums offered by Portland Cement Association.

=== Welding ===
Students learn about traditional forms of welding alongside plasma cutting during this course. At ACC students are taught proper use of standard safety equipment in a state of the art welding laboratory. All welding instructors at ACC are AWS(American Welder Society) certified, allowing for the ability of students' welding to be checked for industry and code standards.

== Notable alumni ==
- Andrea Ball, political aide
