= Ancilla College =

Catholic college in Donaldson, Indiana, US

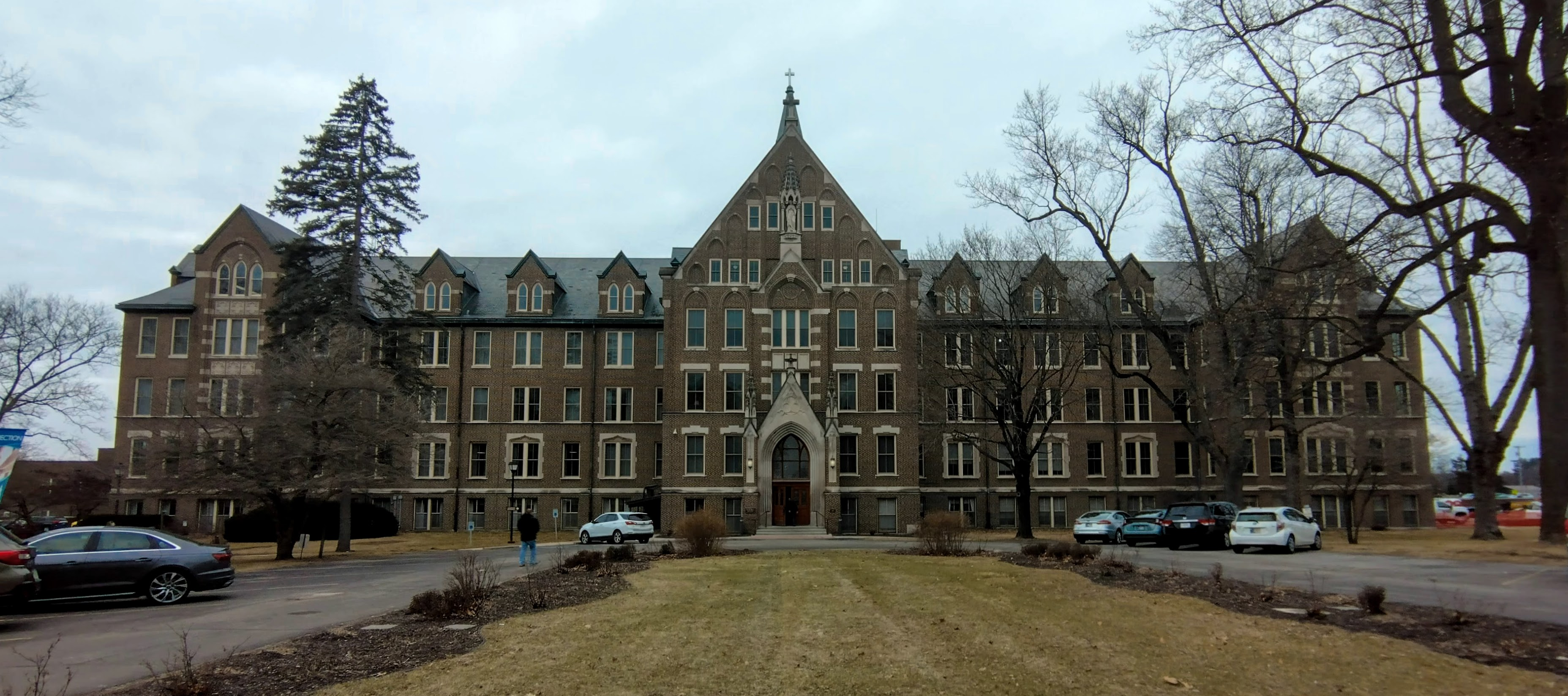
- Type: Private junior college
- Active: 1937–2021
- Religious affiliation: Roman Catholic (Poor Handmaids of Jesus Christ)
- Location: Donaldson, Indiana, United States; 41.3376°N 86.4459°W
- Campus: Rural, 63 acres (25 ha)
- Colors: Royal blue and gold
- Nickname: Chargers
- Sporting affiliations: NJCAA – MCCAA

Ancilla College was a private Catholic junior college near Donaldson, Indiana, United States. It was founded by the Poor Handmaids of Jesus Christ in 1937 as an extension of DePaul University for the training of Catholic novices and candidates of the Poor Handmaids of Jesus Christ. In 1966 the college started admitting the public as a private liberal arts community college. Ancilla College focuses on serving the seven surrounding counties of Indiana. Ancilla College granted associate degrees in multiple programs and had transfer agreements with 14 Indiana colleges and universities. The Latin word ancilla means "handmaid or servant," a reference to the college's sponsor, the Poor Handmaids of Jesus Christ.

In 2021 Ancilla College was merged into Marian University, a fellow Catholic institution based in Indianapolis, as a regional campus.

== Athletics ==
The Ancilla Chargers competed in the Michigan Community College Athletic Association of the National Junior College Athletic Association. Their soccer, volleyball, baseball and softball games were broadcast by the Regional Radio Sports Network.

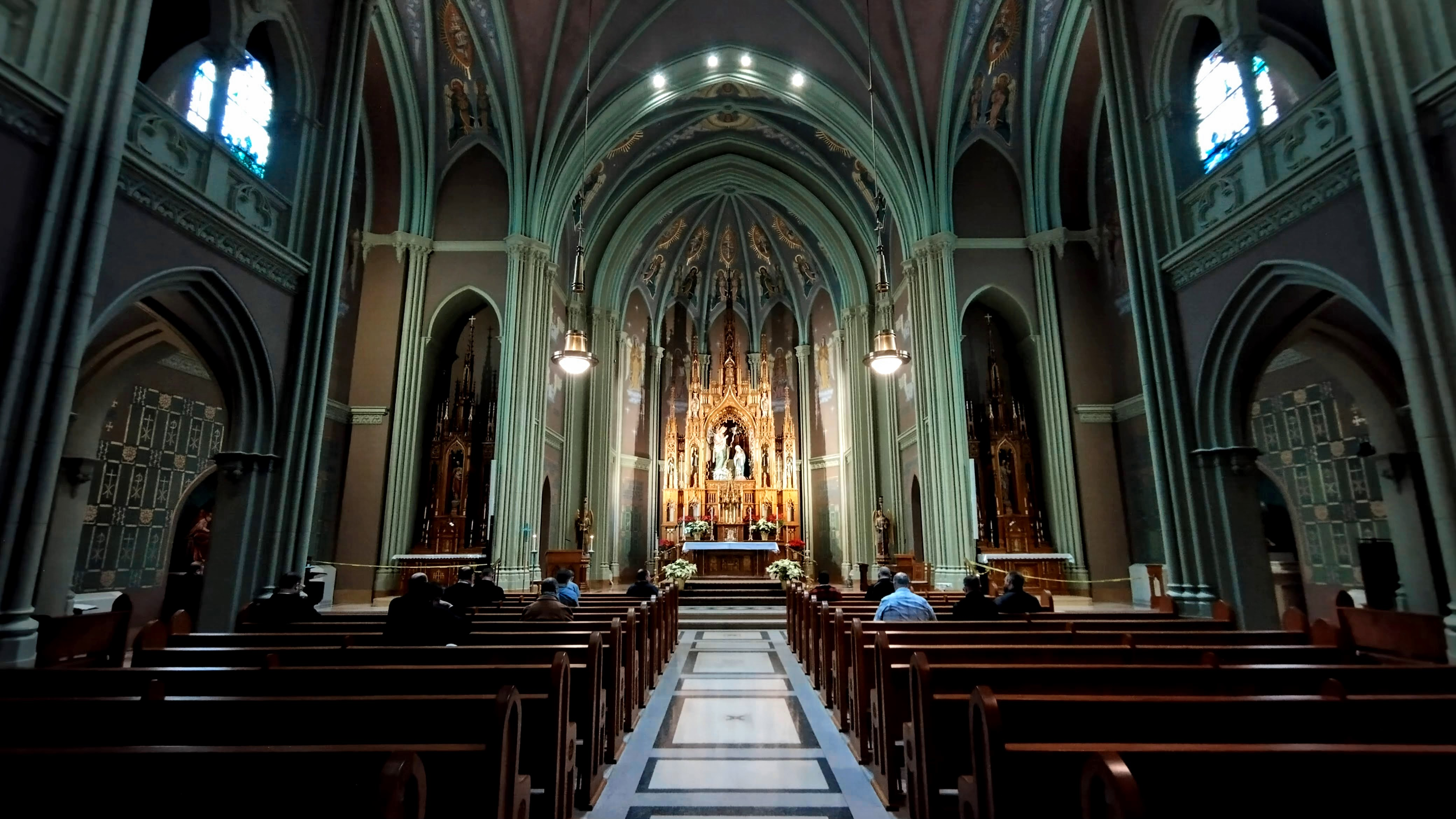
The college chapel
