= St. Clair County Community College =

Public college in Port Huron, Michigan, US

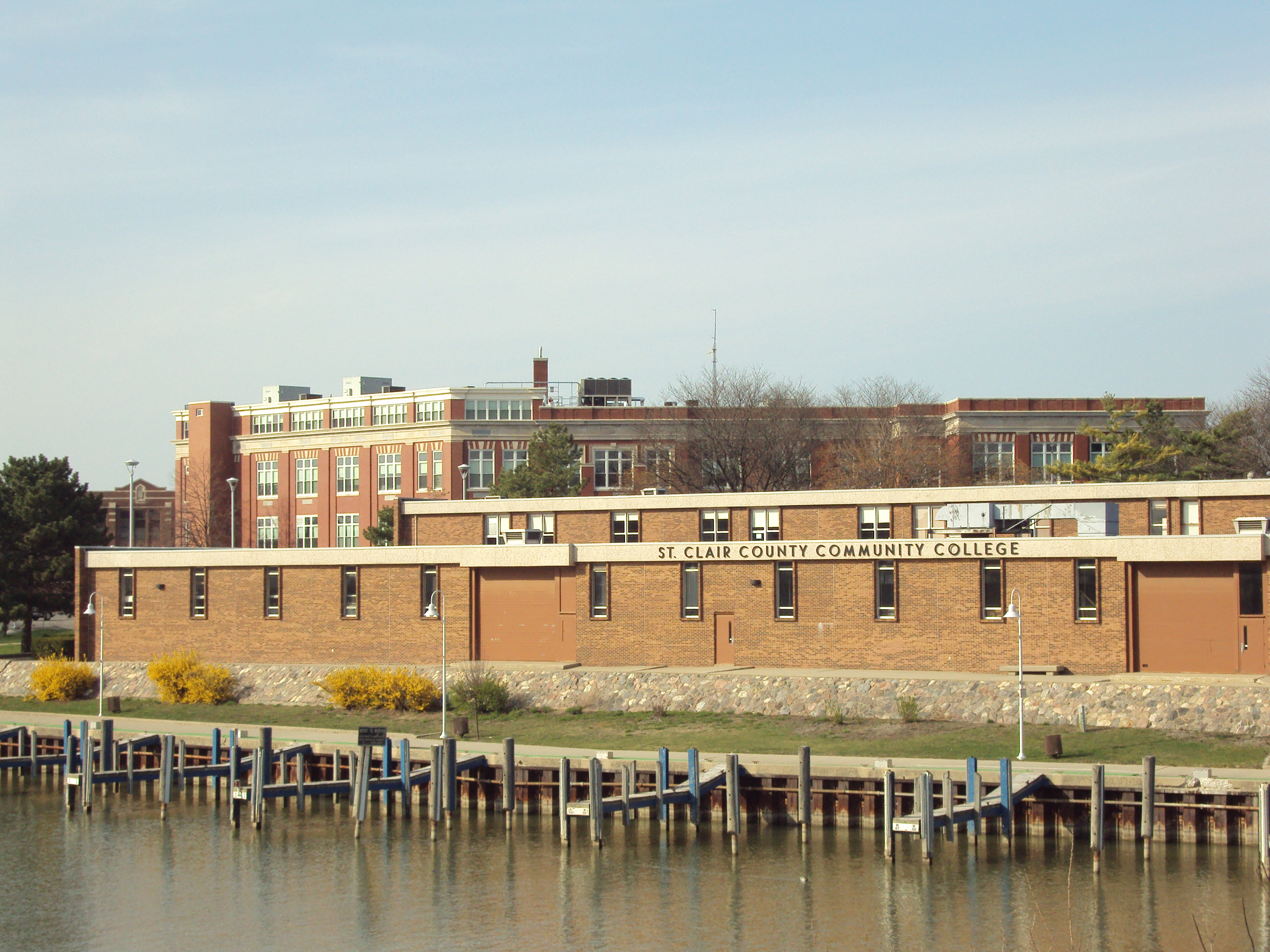
- View from across the Black River in Port Huron
- Motto: Sic iter ad-scientiam (Latin)
- Motto in English: Such is the path to knowledge
- Type: Public community college
- Established: 1923
- President: Kirk Kramer
- Location: Port Huron, Michigan, United States; 42.9796°N 82.4291°W
- Campus: Port Huron, Michigan.
- Colors: Blue and gold
- Mascot: Skippers
- Website: www.sc4.edu

St. Clair County Community College (SC4) is a public community college in Port Huron, Michigan. It serves as the primary center of higher education for the Blue Water Area. SC4 offers associate degree and certificate programs. It also offers online classes and transfer programs to four-year institutions. In addition, working with University Center partners, students can earn Bachelor's and Master's degrees on the SC4 campus.

Classes are held in classrooms on the SC4 campus and taught online. SC4 serves a large portion of the Thumb region of Michigan.

== History ==
St. Clair County Community College began as Port Huron Junior College, which was the Junior College Department of the Port Huron School District. The college was established by act of the Board of Education of the Port Huron School District under Michigan State Law in 1923 and began operation in the same year. It officially became St. Clair County Community College in 1967.

== Athletics ==
The Skippers are affiliated with the National Junior College Athletic Association and play in the Michigan Community College Athletic Association. The school currently has women's and men's cross country, softball, women's and men's bowling, women's volleyball, baseball, men's and women's golf, women's and men's basketball, wrestling, women's soccer, and co-ed dance and esports teams. The 2009-2010 men's basketball team succeeded in winning their way to the 'sweet sixteen' of the NJCAA basketball championship tournament. The women's basketball team competed in the National Tournament three straight years from 2012 to 2014.

== Honor Society ==
Phi Theta Kappa, the honor society for two-year colleges, has repeatedly recognized SC4's own chapter, Lambda Mu as being one of the best in the nation. It won the Chapter of the Year award in 2000, and has won the distinguished chapter award for 14 years consecutively. It's also the oldest society of its kind within Michigan, being founded in 1963.

== Notable alumni ==
- Rob Thomson, professional baseball manager
