= Mid Michigan College =

Public college in Harrison and Mount Pleasant, Michigan, US

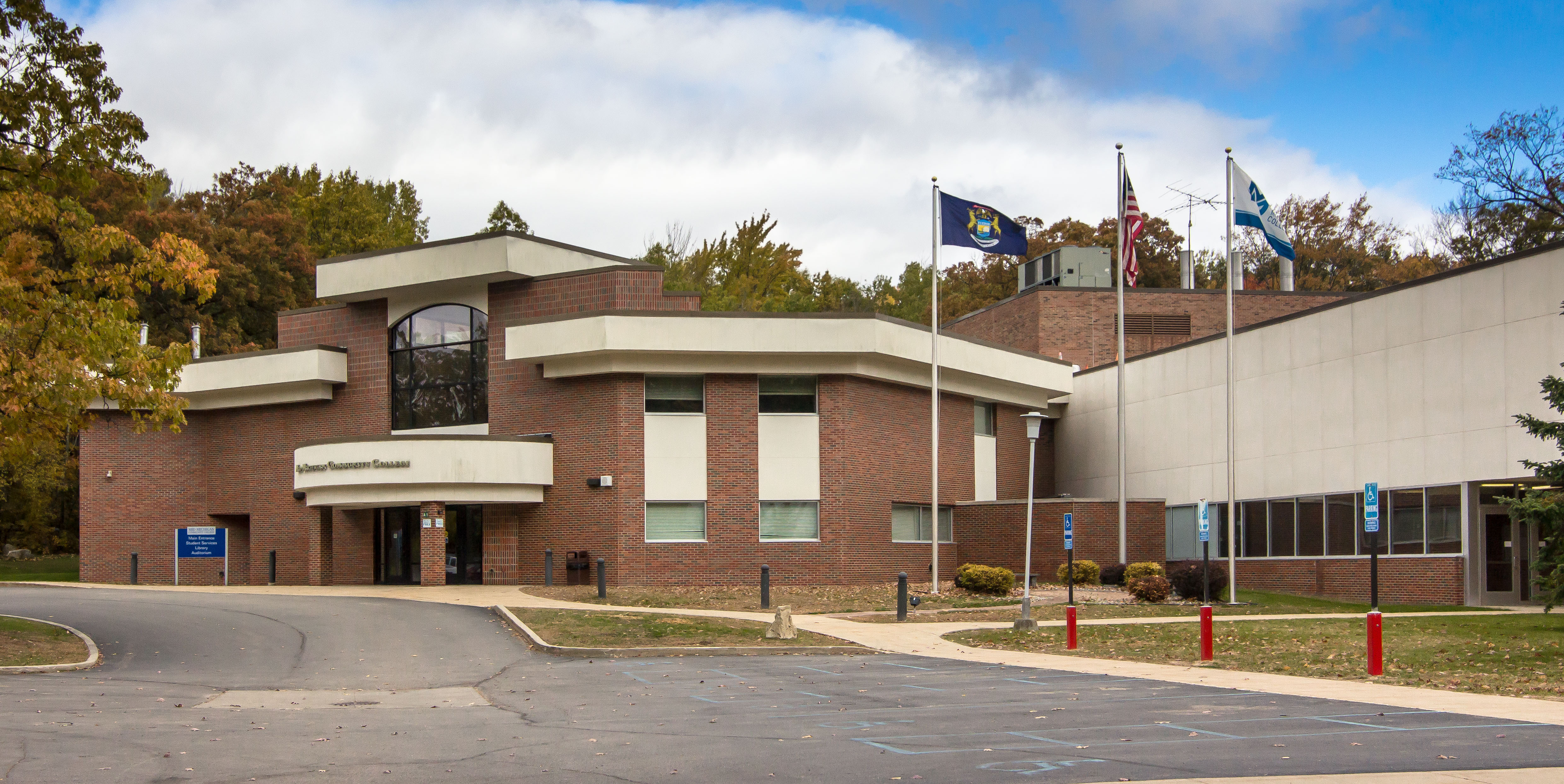
- Former name: Mid Michigan Community College
- Type: Public community college
- Established: 1965; 61 years ago
- Accreditation: HLC
- President: Tim Hood
- Location: Harrison and Mount Pleasant, Michigan, U.S. 43.9694°N 84.7642°W
- Colors
- Nickname: Lakers
- Sporting affiliations: NJCAA
- Mascot: Harry the Heron
- Website: www.midmich.edu
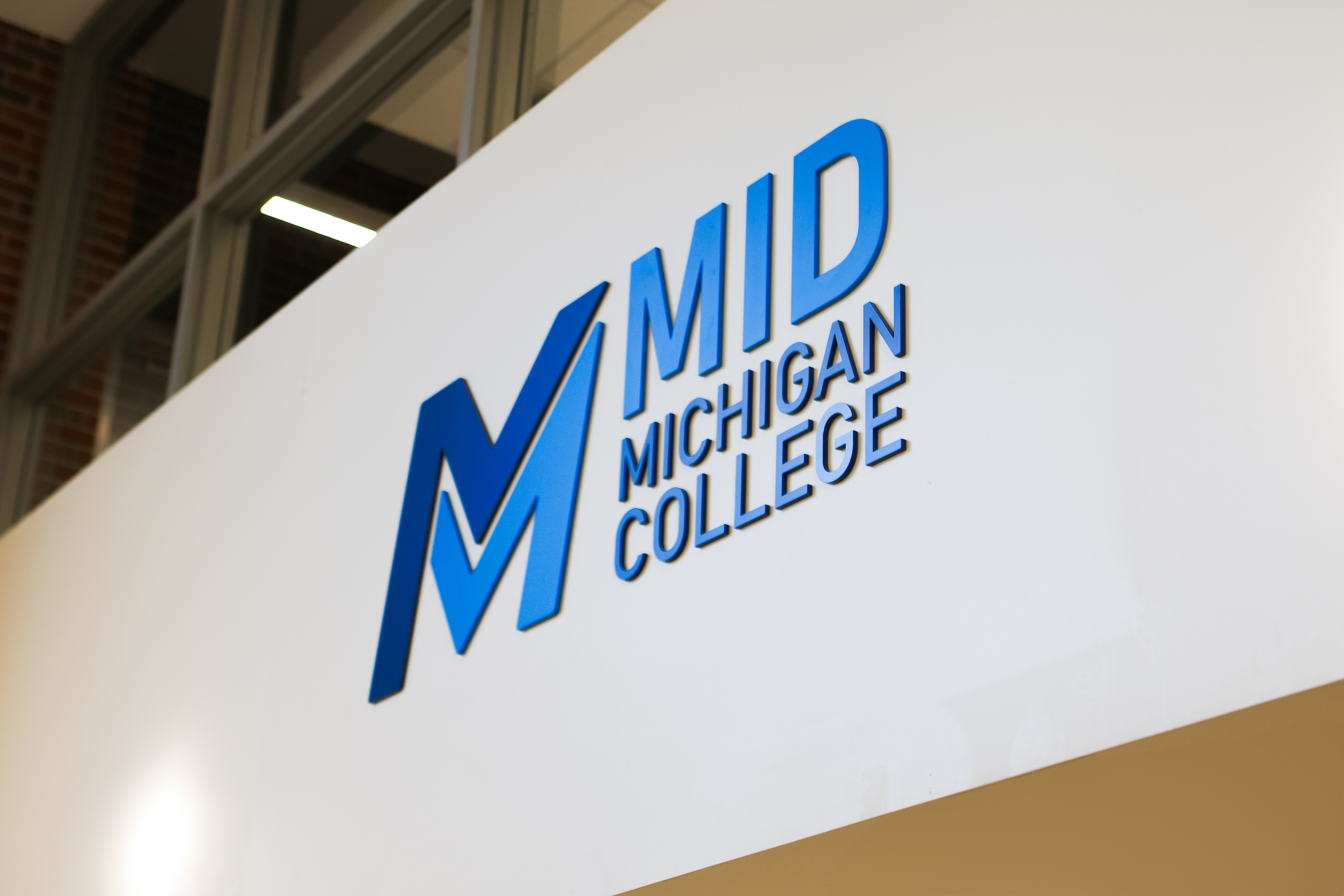

Mid Michigan College (Mid) is a public community college with two locations in Michigan, one in Harrison and one in Mount Pleasant. Founded in 1965, the college offers one- and two-year certificates and associate degrees in occupational and health science programs.

The Harrison Campus is in on 560 acres (2.3 km^{2}) of land, including multiple trails open all year long and free to the public. The Mount Pleasant Campus is 27 miles (43 km) south of the Harrison Campus.

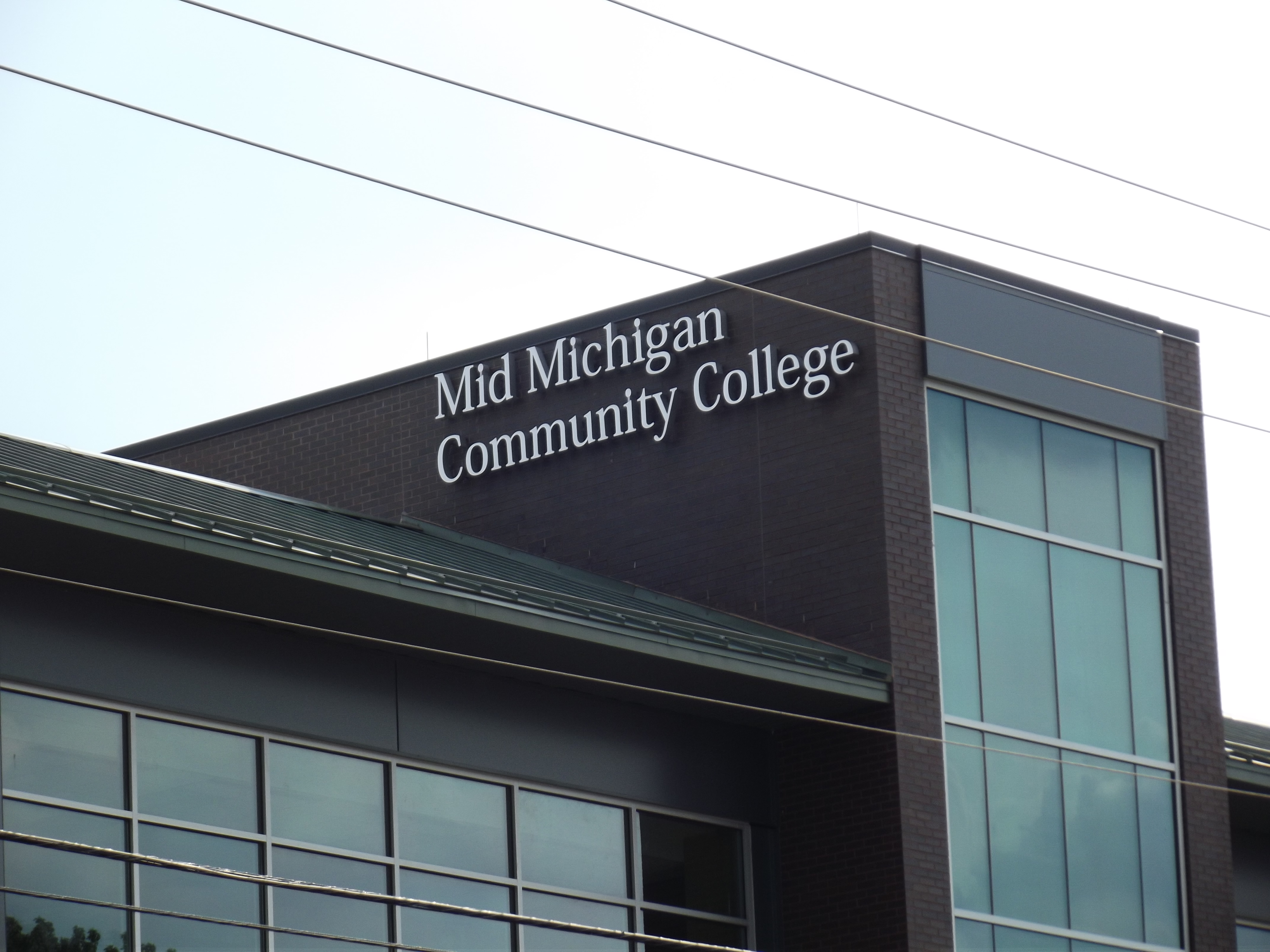
Photo, July 2014, of a new building at the Mt. Pleasant, MI campus of Mid Michigan College

In 2021 the entire territory of Mount Pleasant Public Schools joined the service area and the taxation area of Mid Michigan College as per the results of an election. 1,593 and 1,415 voters respectively approved being a part of the service area and taxation area while 952 and 1,141 respectively voted against each.

== Athletics ==
Mid currently fields six varsity teams in the following sports: men's basketball, women's basketball, men's and women's bowling, baseball, and softball.
