= Kalamazoo Valley Community College =

Public college in Kalamazoo, Michigan, US

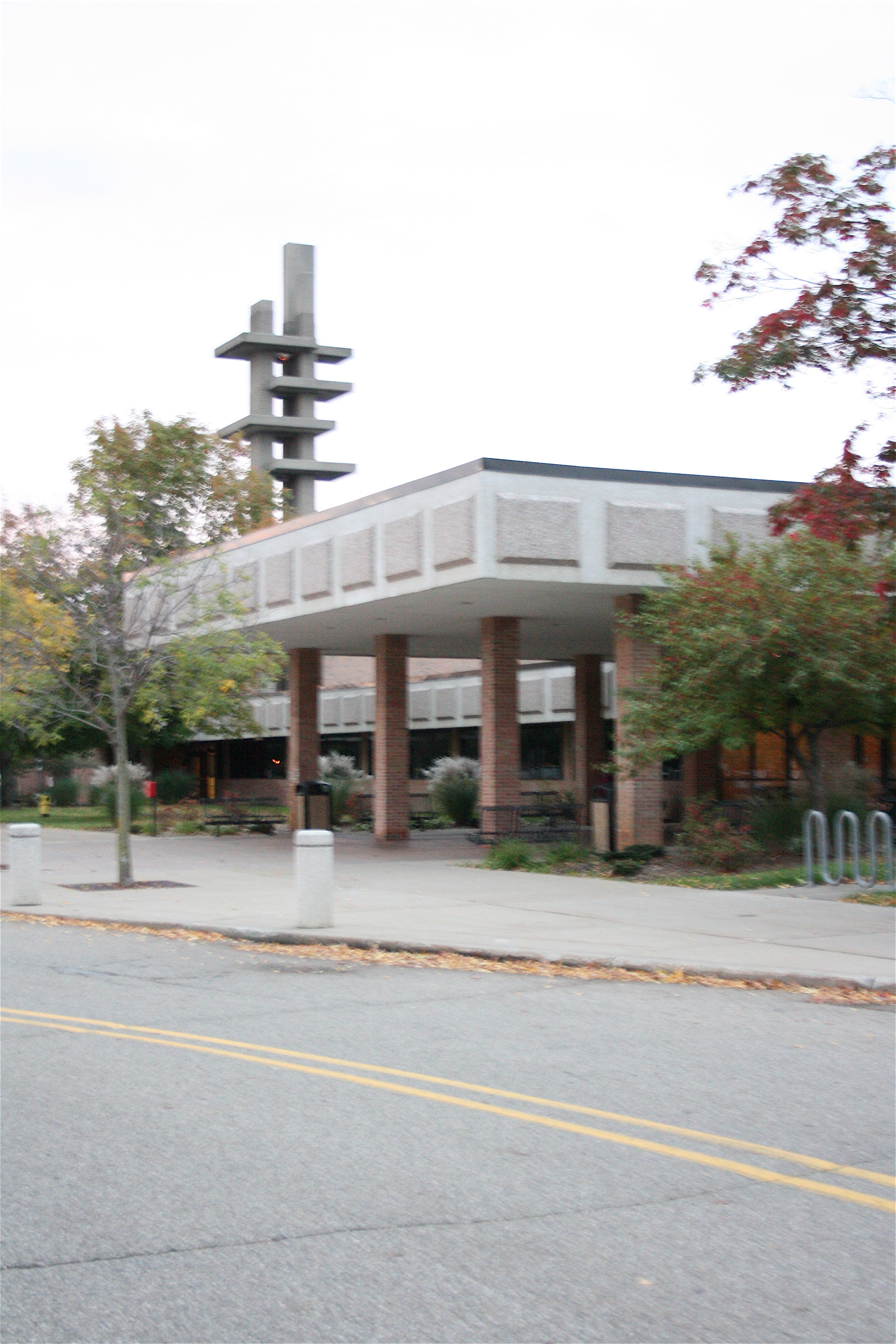
- Type: Public community college
- Established: 1966; 60 years ago
- Endowment: $29.1 million (2025)
- President: L. Marshall Washington
- Students: 9,832 (2022)
- Location: Kalamazoo, Michigan, USA
- Colors: Valley Blue, White
- Nickname: Cougars
- Website: www.kvcc.edu

Kalamazoo Valley Community College (KVCC) is a public community college in Kalamazoo, Michigan. Its main campus is located in Texas Charter Township, with a few other locations located in Kalamazoo.

== History ==
KVCC was founded on August 1, 1966, after a meeting in which people from nine different school districts in the area voted to support and establish a new community college. The school began offering classes in 1968, consisting of 1,518 students and 47 faculty members at the time of its opening. It also became the 29th community college in Michigan when it opened.

On March 1, 1967 Dale B. Lake becomes the first president of KVCC. Dr. Lake was the president of Kalamazoo Valley Community College until October 1, 1982. Marilyn Schlack served as the second president of the college for 35 years and retired in 2017. L. Marshall Washington, was chosen as the third president of KVCC on Thursday March 15, 2018.

== Locations ==
Currently, Kalamazoo Valley Community College has four campuses: Texas Township, Arcadia Commons, Groves Campus, and the Bronson Healthy Living Campus.

=== Texas Township Campus ===
Designed by Alden B. Dow, a student of Frank Lloyd Wright, the Texas Township Campus is located near the I-94 and U.S. 131 interchange on 185 acres of rolling woodland west of Kalamazoo. Expanded several times over the last 55 years, the 430,000-square-foot complex features modern classrooms, comprehensive library and computer capabilities, two gymnasiums, a swimming pool, ball fields, tennis courts, a running track, two auditoriums, food services, free parking in expansive lots, and fully equipped labs for science, industrial and manufacturing technologies.

=== Arcadia Commons Campus ===
Located in downtown Kalamazoo, the Arcadia Commons Campus, build in 1994, includes Anna Whitten Hall, the Kalamazoo Valley Museum, and the Center for New Media. The campus serves as a hub for community, business and education partnerships that renovated and revitalized a significant portion of the historic downtown area.

==== Anna Whitten Hall ====
Located downtown Kalamazoo on the Arcadia Commons Campus, the 55,000-square-foot Anna Whitten Hall, features 15 classrooms, a library, computer lab, new media art gallery and outdoor relaxation areas. Opened in 2004 and named for in honor of longtime Board of Trustee’s member Anna Whitten, Anna Whitten Hall offers a full range of student support services are available including admissions, records, registration, transcripts requests, pay station, counseling, financial aid, tutoring services and student activities. The facilities and services of the Kalamazoo Valley Museum, as well as other downtown institutions, are frequently used to supplement the students' learning experience.

==== Kalamazoo Valley Museum ====
The Kalamazoo Valley Museum, located near the Arcadia Commons Campus, offers a multi-sensory glimpse into the Kalamazoo area's history. A 60,000-square-foot educational resource in the heart of downtown Kalamazoo, it provides children and adults with hands-on learning opportunities in history, science, and technology. The museum seeks to develop cultural, historical and scientific literacy through innovative permanent exhibits, special traveling exhibitions, planetarium programs, and family events. As of 2025, the Kalamazoo Valley Museum is free admission.

==== Center for New Media ====
The Center for New Media is located in the historic W. S. Dewing Building in the heart of the city. It was a part of a deal with the Greenleaf Companies, and KVCC to renovate and expand the building to house its career-based, industry-standard instruction for all aspects of digital media. Three floors of state-of-the art iMac and PC classrooms, two drawing studios, a photography studio and five art galleries comprise this innovative building. Student and community art is featured monthly in the galleries as part of the Arts Council of Greater Kalamazoo’s Art Hops.

The state-of-the-art facility features 11 classrooms and computer labs operating on both Mac and PC platforms specifically created for drawing, fine art, photography and videography, 3D animation, web development and software training, several practice and production labs including a print and prepress production lab and a lighting lab, five galleries showcasing student artwork, designs and projects, offices and conference rooms for faculty and student meetings, and Design Crew Offices: a designated student office space specifically created to provide a unique and private environment to nurture creativity in the approach, application, and management of project work for outside non-profit clients.

=== Bronson Healthy Living Campus ===
With its focus on a healthier tomorrow, the Culinary and Allied Health Building anchors Kalamazoo Valley Community College’s new Bronson Healthy Living Campus near downtown Kalamazoo and serves as a catalyst for urban revitalization, community health, and workforce development.

==== Marilyn J Schlack Culinary Allied Health ====
The Marilyn J. Schlack Culinary and Allied Health Building, part of the Bronson Healthy Living Campus, is a space where students make connections between food, health, and sustainability. It houses Kalamazoo Valley’s Menus That Matter™ Culinary Arts program and Sustainable Brewing program on the first and second floors. The college’s nursing, emergency medical technician, and respiratory therapy programs are on the third floor. The building also contains a student-run restaurant and café.

==== Food Innovation Center ====
Kalamazoo Valley students and partners explore new trends in growing food indoors and in reclaimed urban environments at the Food Innovation Center on the Bronson Healthy Living Campus. The site hosts a food hub for aggregating foods from local farms to supply area hospitals, schools and other institutions. Indoor growing space, processing and distribution facility, quality assurance testing lab, classroom and greenhouse, and outdoor gardens and education spaces are located in the FIC.
