= North Central Michigan College =

Community college in Petoskey, Michigan, U.S.

- Type: Public community college
- Established: 1958
- President: David Roland Finley
- Faculty: 32 full time, 130 adjunct
- Administrative staff: 68
- Students: 2,341 (Fall 2018)
- Location: Petoskey, Michigan, United States; 45.3614°N 84.9528°W
- Campus: Petoskey with three extension centers (Cheboygan, Gaylord, East Jordan)
- Colors: Blue and Gold
- Mascot: Timberwolf
- Website: ncmich.edu

North Central Michigan College (NCMC) is a public community college in Petoskey, Michigan. It was established in 1959 and is Michigan's 12th community college. NCMC has two additional learning centers, one in Gaylord, Michigan and one in Cheboygan, Michigan. NCMC is one of 30 community colleges in the state of Michigan.

== History ==
Development of the current campus began in 1962, when the college bought 10 acres (40,000 m^{2}) of land. By 1963 the first buildings were completed and some classes were held on the new campus at 1515 Howard Street. A chemistry building, heating plant and temporary library were the first structures to be built, and over the next few years more land was purchased for additional facilities. Most buildings were constructed in the late 1960s. The Library/Conference Center was added in 1984.

The Student and Community Resource Center was completed in 2001. The Center has physical education and recreation facilities, an expanded college bookstore, and the College's Learning Support Services, which include open computer labs, a tutoring center, assessment and testing facilities, and study areas.

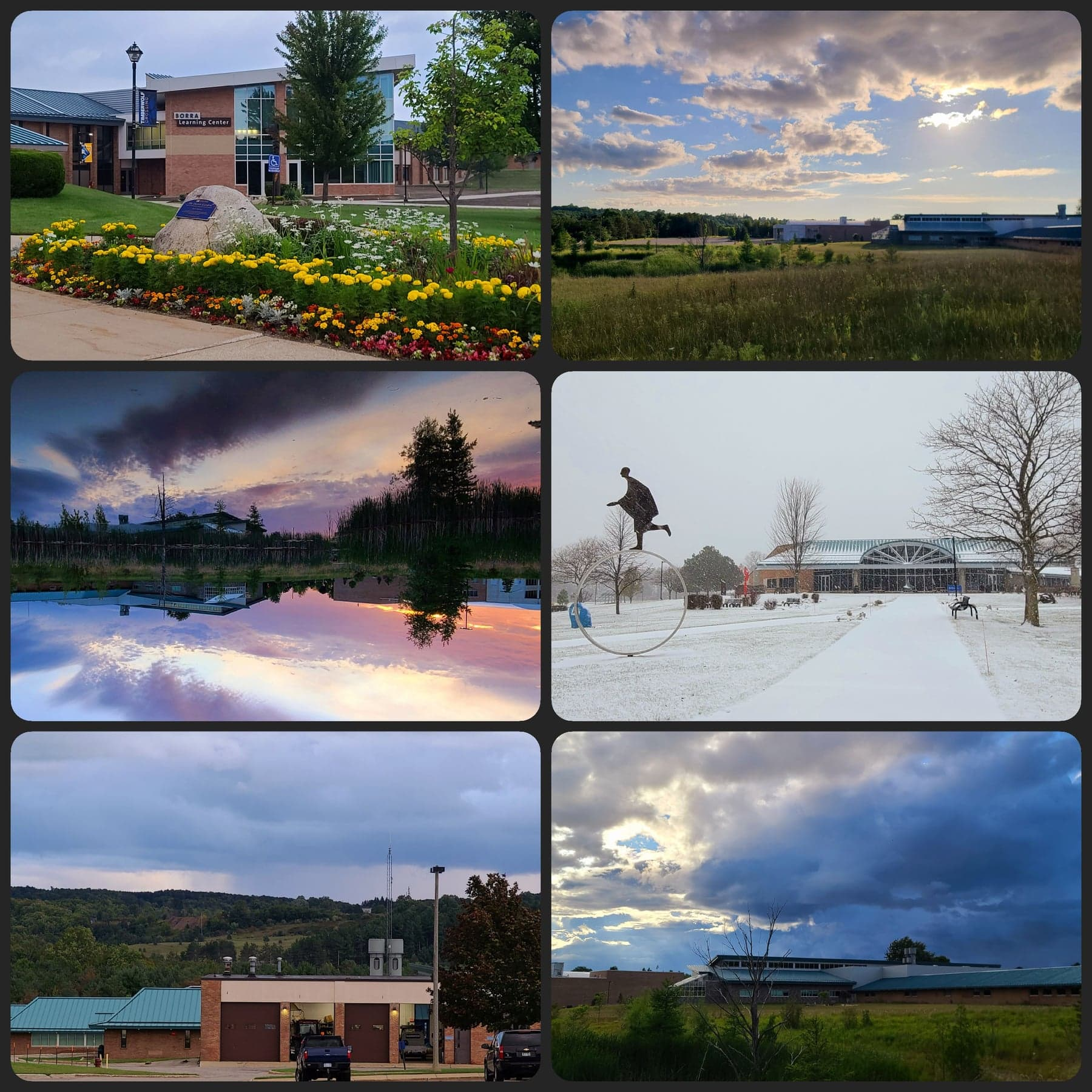
North Central Michigan College Borra Learning Center, Natural Area/Health Sciences Bldg, Natural Area Pond, Library & Sculptures, Grounds and Maintenance, Gym and Health Sciences Bldg

The latest addition to the campus is the Health Education and Science Center, a 23,300 square-foot building to house biology, chemistry, Earth science and physics laboratories, classrooms and office space for faculty and staff. a renovation of the previous science laboratory space created 17,150 square feet of instructional space for nursing labs and general-purpose classrooms.

== Athletics ==
NCMC fields athletic teams known as the Timberwolves, in the sports of men's and women's basketball, men's and women's cross country, men's and women's track, women's volleyball, and co-ed esports.

== Notable alumni ==
- Alton Davis
- Sue Rocca
- April Winchell
