= Jackson College =

Public college in Jackson County, Michigan, US

Coordinates: 42.16442°N 84.40350°W

- Former names: Jackson Junior College; Jackson Community College
- Type: Public college
- Established: 1928
- Endowment: $12,757,187
- President: Daniel J. Phelan
- Faculty: 72 full-time
- Administrative staff: 175 full-time 406 part-time
- Students: 5,487
- Location: Jackson, Michigan, U.S.
- Campus: Urban, multiple campuses
- Colors: Gold and maroon
- Nickname: Jets
- Sporting affiliations: NJCAA Division II
- Website: www.jccmi.edu

Jackson College is a public college in Jackson County, Michigan. Originally established as Jackson Junior College in 1928, Jackson County electors voted to reincorporate the institution as a community college district under the "Public Act 188 of 1955" in 1962. In 1964 voters approved a charter millage that continues to indefinitely fund the college. In June 2013, the board of trustees approved an official name change from Jackson Community College to Jackson College.

Jackson College has been accredited by the Higher Learning Commission since 1933 and offers 48 associate degrees, certificate programs, and transfer options to Jackson County and Michigan residents. Today, the college has a yearly enrollment of nearly 8,000 students across its several locations. These locations are: Central Campus located in Summit Township, JC/LISD Academy in Adrian, and the LeTarte Center in Hillsdale, as well as online programs.

Jackson College's Central Campus offers student housing facilities, becoming one of only a handful of community colleges in Michigan to offer student housing. The college provides a variety of Division II athletic programs, including basketball, baseball, softball, soccer, bowling, cross country and golf.

== History ==
Jackson College was founded as Jackson Junior College in 1928 and operated as a division of the Jackson Public Schools. Voters agreed to make it a separate entity in 1962, and the name was changed to Jackson Community College in 1965. In June 2013, the school's board of directors approved a name change to Jackson College. Daniel Phelan, president of the college at the time, is quoted as saying that the word "community" was removed to reflect the highest degree offered by the college. Trustees also set a budget of $50,000 for the rebranding all items bearing the college's name and logo.

== Campuses ==
Jackson college currently operates on 3 campuses and satellite programs in and around the Jackson area.

- Central Campus - The primary and largest of the 3 locations, with the majority of the college's academic buildings and administrative offices being located here, in addition to sports complexes, a nature trail, and frisbee golf course. Most notably, central campus includes the Potter Center, which is among the most versatile and capable performing arts centers in the Southern region of Michigan.
- Jackson College Hillsdale -- Hillsdale campus offering college classes for students in the Hillsdale county area.
- Jackson College Lenawee -- Adrian campus offers college classes for students in the Lenawee County area.
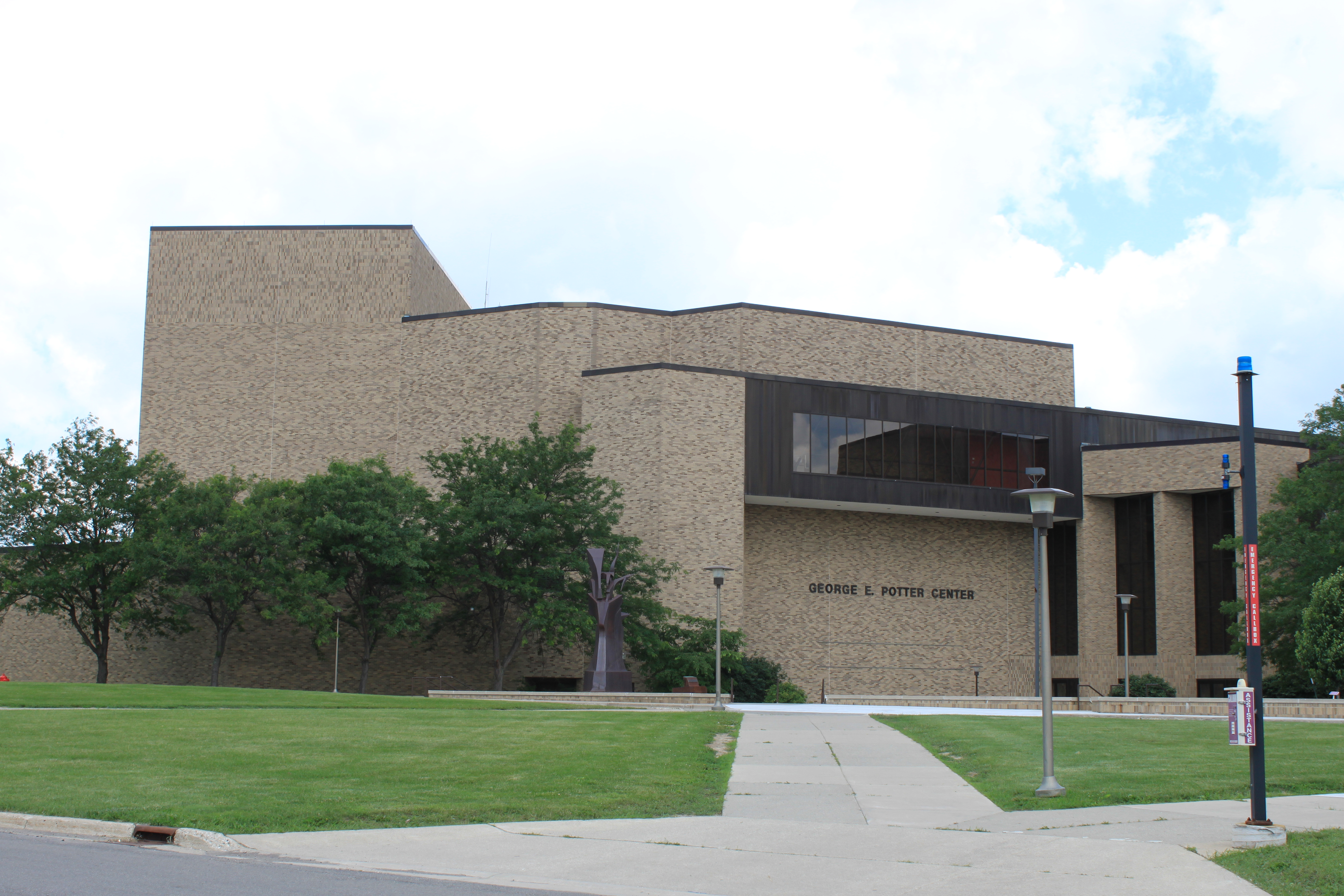
George E. Potter Center at the Central Campus

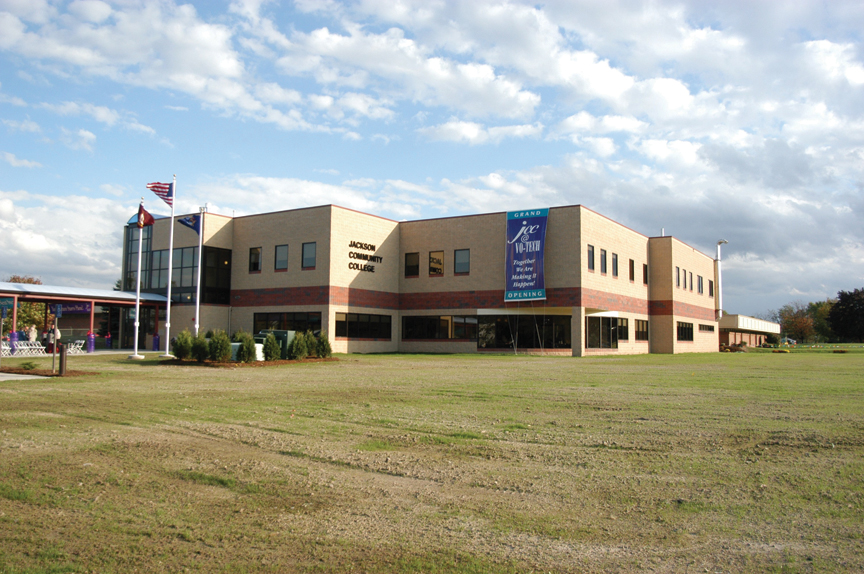
JC @ LISD TECH

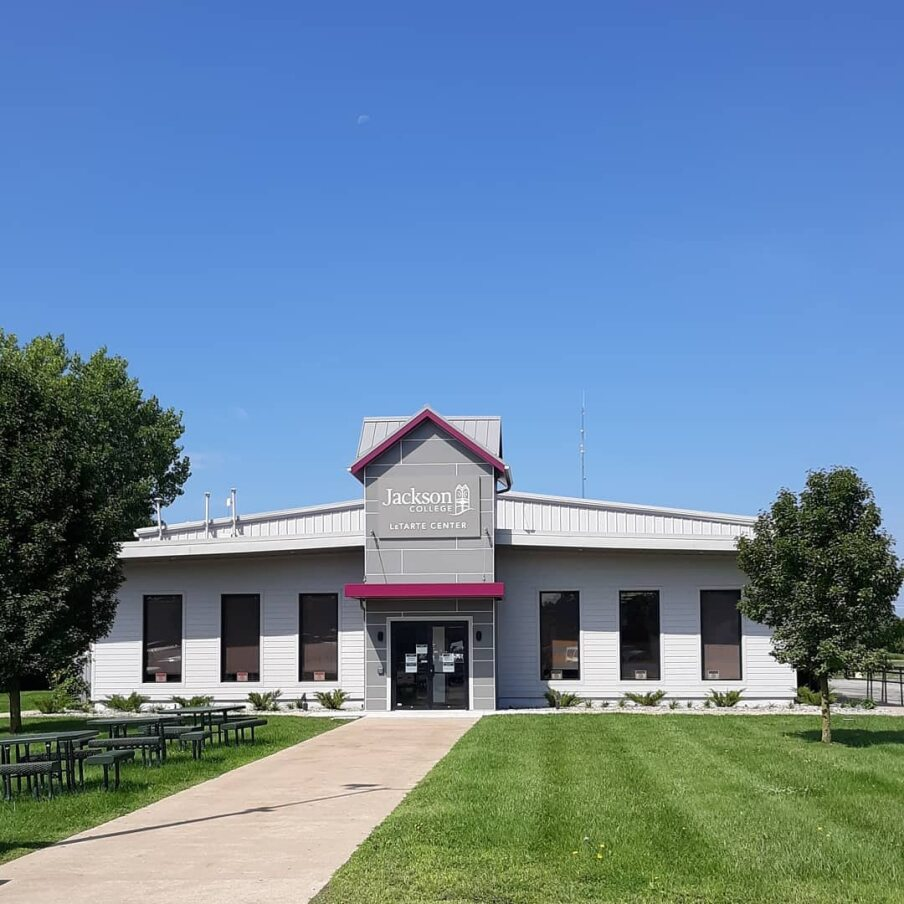
Jackson College Hillsdale

=== Closed campuses ===
- JC/LISD Academy - Now closed, started in 2003 as a partnership program with the Lenawee Intermediate School District, and located in Adrian, Michigan. The program is intended to immerse ambitious high school students in the post-secondary learning environment, while affording them the opportunity to both complete a high school diploma and receive an associate degree in a 5 year period. While it started in 2003 under the nickname JC @ LISD TECH, where classes held in classrooms within the 11 Lenawee school districts it offered classes to, the program became JC/LISD Academy in 2013 upon the opening of a brick and mortar building, rather than. The 27,000-square-foot location features modern technology, classroom spaces, a science wing, a full-service bookstore, and a bistro.
- W.J. Maher Campus - This now closed campus was opened in 2012. It was named after William J. Maher, a veteran US Navy pilot who served in World War 2, following the Maher family and their foundation's gifting of a sizable monetary donation raised via fundraiser, solely in support of the Maher Campus. Campus operations were indefinitely halted in 2020 due to the COVID-19 pandemic, and the building was sold to Automated Logistics Systems on June 3, 2023.
- Jackson Flight Center - Now closed, it was opened in 1979. Located at the Jackson Airport, the JC Aviation program educated future pilots with both the flight and ground hours necessary to receive a pilot's license. A trend of diminishing interest in the program was noticed by educators since the events of the 9/11 terrorist attacks, although there may be no direct connection to such events. It was shut down August 6, 2020, immediately following the COVID-19 pandemic, due to such declining levels of interest. There was a notable revamping of local interest in aviation education from the creation of Flight School Jackson, a private flight school founded in the absence of the JC Aviation program.

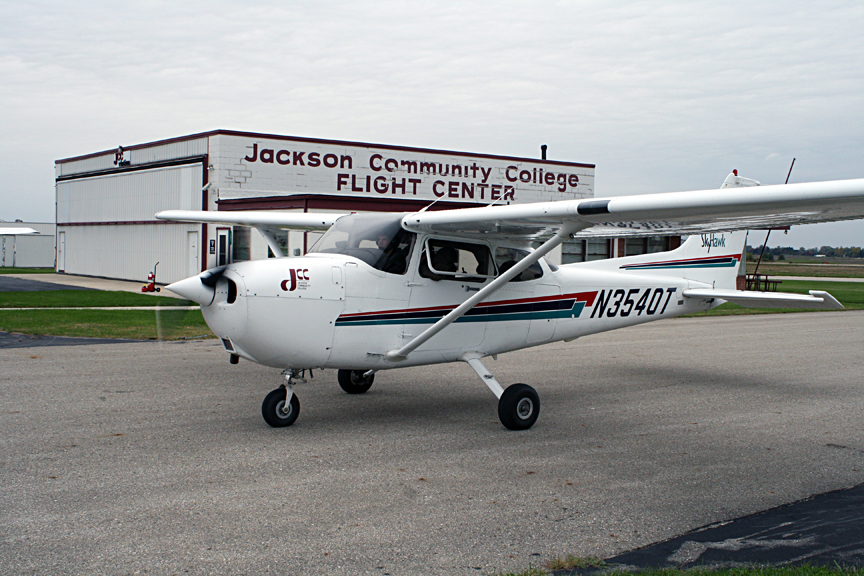
The Flight Center, pictured with a decaled Cessna 172 in taxi.

=== Student housing ===
Housing at Jackson College is limited to its Central Campus, and there are currently 3 student residence buildings. The Campus View residences, ordered by their respective construction years, include Campus View 1 (built in 2007), Campus View 2 (built in 2009), and Campus View 3 (built in 2015).

CV1 and CV2 are both located on the southeast corner of the Central campus, while CV3 is located on the south side.

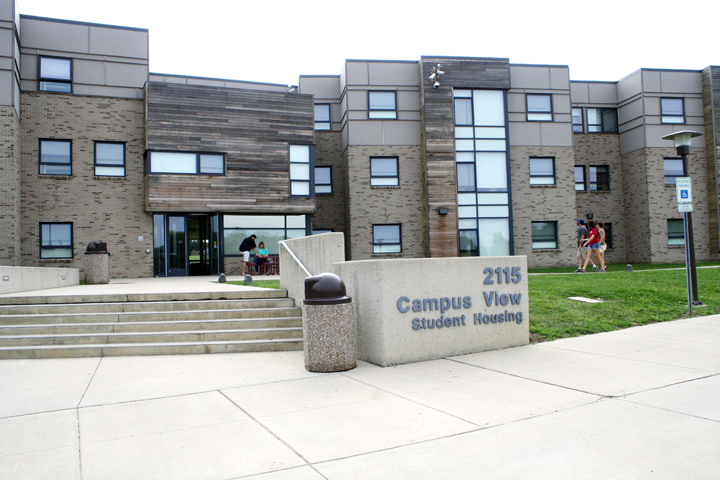
Campus View 1

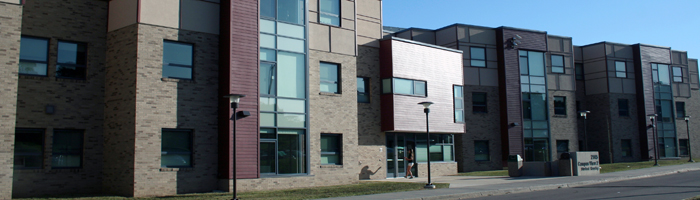
Campus View 2

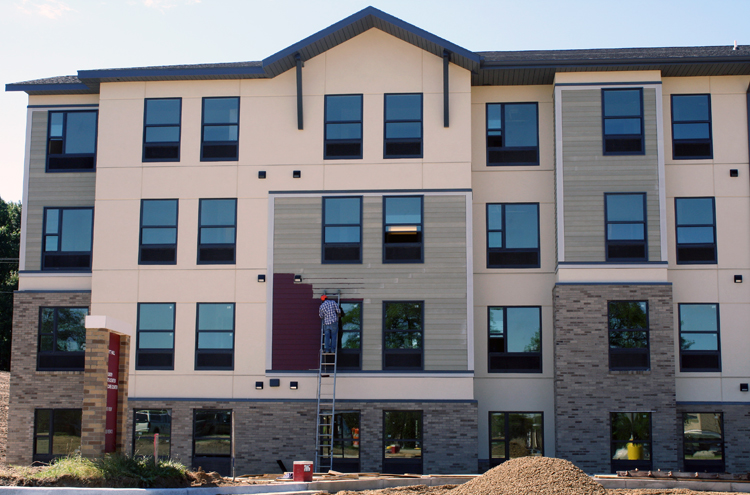
Campus View 3

== Athletics ==
Jackson College fields athletics teams known as the Jets. They compete in the NJCAA.

== Campus Map ==
=== JC Central Campus ===
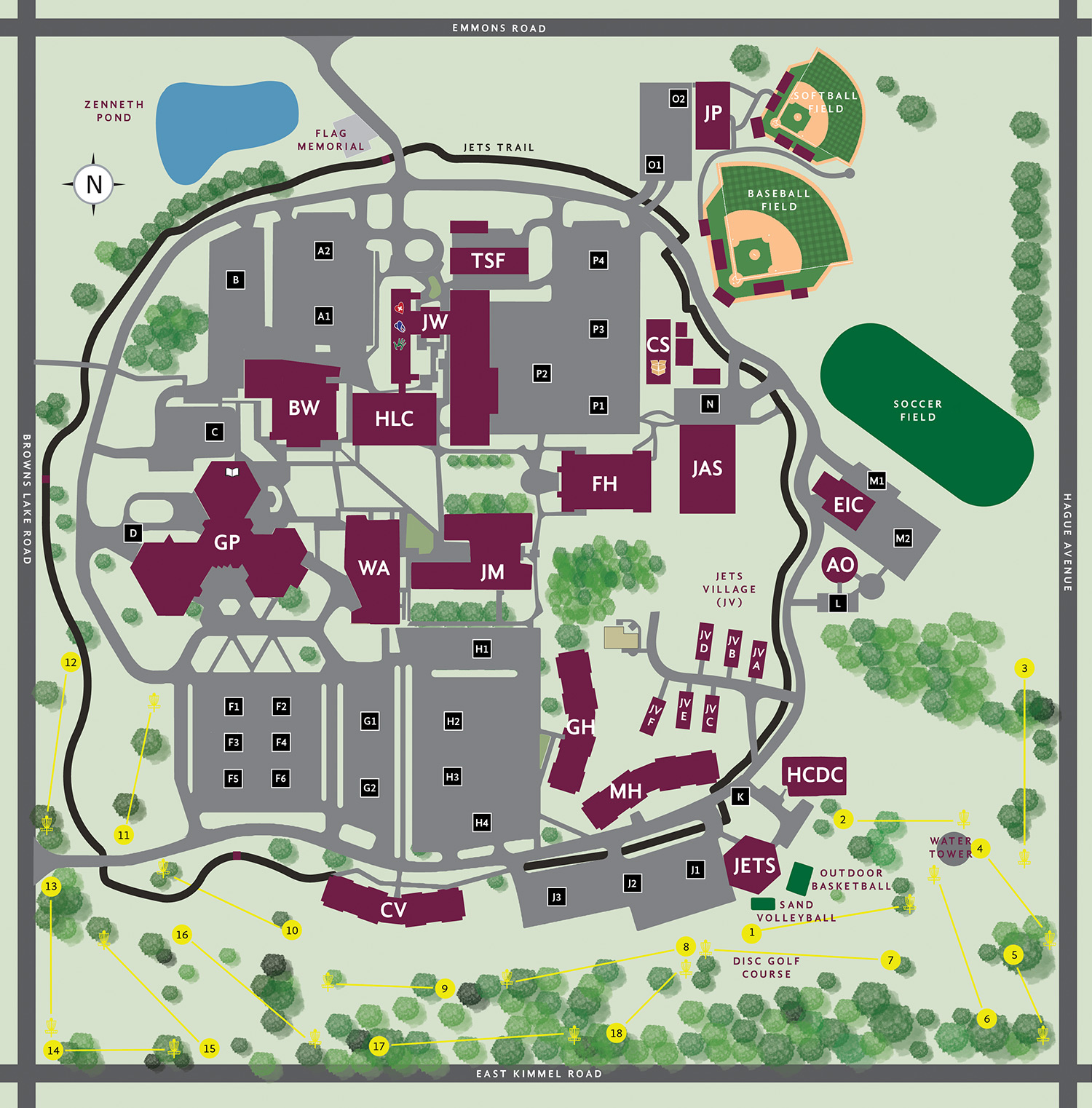
A map of Central Campus at JC
