= Glen Oaks Community College =

Community college in Centreville, Michigan, U.S.

- Type: Public community college
- Established: 1965
- President: David Devier
- Students: 1864
- Location: Centreville, Michigan, United States; 41.8922°N 85.4967°W
- Mascot: Vikings
- Website: www.glenoaks.edu
- Location within the state of Michigan

Glen Oaks Community College is a public community college in Centreville, Michigan.

== History ==
In 1965, Nora Hagen donated a considerable amount of land in Sherman Township to Glen Oaks. Soon afterward, Glen Oaks was approved by the state as a credible institution authorized to provide college courses to students. Hagen, who gives her name to many sites at Glen Oaks, was one of the last surviving members of her immediate family and decided that the newly conceived college should receive those 120 acres (486,000 m^{2}). She did so, commemorating the event in the following statements:

"This farm of 120 acres [486,000 m²] with the farmhouse and other buildings has been in the Henry B. Hagen family name for 90 years.

"In the year 1965 it was given to the St. Joseph County community college district to be used as the central campus of Glen Oaks Community College for the education of the county's young people.

"It is the memory of my father and mother, my sister Louise C. Fry and her husband Stephen D. Fry, who became co-owners with me of this homestead in 1930, that I fondly dedicate this plaque.

"May God's blessing rest on all who pass this way."

5 November 1965,
Nora C. Hagen,
The Last Survivor

== Leadership ==
David Devier retired as the college's president on June 30, 2024. He was succeeded by Bryan Newton.

== Athletics ==
Glen Oaks has seven different sports programs: softball, volleyball, men's and women's basketball, baseball, and basketball; and men's golf.
