= List of university and college name changes in the United States =

Here follows a list of renamings of universities and colleges in the United States.

== A ==
Current name	Former name(s)	Year of Change
Adams State University	Adams State College	2012
University of Advancing Technology	CAD Institute; University of Advancing Computer Technology	1996, 2002
Adventist University of Health Sciences	Florida Hospital College of Health Sciences	2012
Alabama Agricultural and Mechanical University	State Normal School and University for the Education of the Colored Teachers and Students (1873–1878); State Normal and Industrial School (1878–1885); State Normal and Industrial School of Huntsville (1885–1896) The State Agricultural and Mechanical College for Negroes (1896–1919); State Agricultural and Mechanical Institute for Negroes (1919–1948); Alabama Agricultural and Mechanical College (1948–1949); Alabama A&M College (1949–1969)	1969
University of Alabama	The University of the State of Alabama	1820–1827
Alabama State University	Lincoln Normal School of Marion; State Teachers College; Alabama State College for Negroes; Alabama State College	1969
Alaska Pacific University	Alaska Methodist University	
Albany State University	Georgia Normal and Agricultural College, Albany State College	1917, 1932
Alcorn State University	Alcorn Agricultural and Mechanical College	1974
Alliant International University	California Western	
Amridge University	Southern Christian University; Alabama Christian School of Religion; Regions University	
Anabaptist Mennonite Biblical Seminary	Associated Mennonite Biblical Seminary	2012
Anderson University (Indiana)	Anderson Bible Training School; Anderson College and Theological Seminary; Anderson College	1988
Anderson University (South Carolina)	Johnson Female Seminary 1848; Anderson College	2006
Andersonville Theological Seminary	Andersonville Baptist Seminary	2002
Antioch University Midwest	Antioch University McGregor	2010
AOMA Graduate School of Integrative Medicine	Academy of Oriental Medicine at Austin	2012
Appalachian State University	Appalachian State Teachers College; Appalachian Training School for Teachers; Appalachian State Normal School; Watauga Academy	1967
Apollo College	American Institute of Health Technology	2005
Arcadia University	Beaver College	2001
Arizona Christian University	Southwestern Conservative Baptist Bible College	2011
Arizona State University	Tempe Normal School	1958
University of Arkansas at Little Rock	Little Rock Junior College; Little Rock University	1957, 1969
University of Arkansas at Monticello	Fourth District Agricultural School; Arkansas Agricultural & Mechanical College	1925, 1971
University of Arkansas at Fort Smith	Fort Smith Junior College; Westark Junior College; Westark Community College; Westark College	1966, 1972, 1998, 2000
University of Arkansas at Pine Bluff	Arkansas AM&N College; Branch Normal College	1972
University of Arkansas Community College at Batesville	Gateway Technical College	
University of Arkansas Community College at Hope	Red River Technical-Vocational School; Red River Technical College	1991, 1998
University of Arkansas Community College at Morrilton	Petit Jean Vocationa-Technical School; Petit Jean Technical College	1991, 2001
Arkansas Tech University	Second District Agricultural School; Arkansas Polytechnic College	1925, 1976
Arkansas Tech University Ozark campus	Arkansas Valley Vocational Technical School; Arkansas Valley Technical Institute	1991, 2003
Armstrong State University	Armstrong College of Savannah; Armstrong State College; Armstrong Atlantic State University	2014
Art Institute of Las Vegas	Denver Automotive and Diesel College	
Asbury University	Asbury College	2010
The Athenaeum of Ohio	St. Francis Xavier Seminary; Mount St. Mary's of the West	
Athens State University	Athens Female Academy; Athens Female Institute; Athens College; Athens State College	1998
Auburn University	East Alabama Male College; Agricultural and Mechanical College of Alabama; Alabama Polytechnic Institute;	1960
Augusta Technical College	Augusta Technical Institute	2000
Augusta University	Augusta College (1828), Augusta State University (1996), Georgia Regents University (2012)	2015

== B ==
Current name	Former name(s)	Year of Change
Babson College	Babson Institute	1969
Baldwin Wallace University	Baldwin Institute (1845), Baldwin University (1855), Baldwin-Wallace College (1913)	2012
Batten University	Virginia Wesleyan College; Virginia Wesleyan University	2017, 2026
Bellevue College	Bellevue Community College	2009
Bemidji State University	Bemidji State College	
Benedictine University	St. Procopius College (1887), Illinois Benedictine College (1971)	1996
Benedictine University at Springfield	Springfield Junior College, Springfield College in Illinois (1929)	2009
Bethune-Cookman University	Bethune-Cookman College	2007
Biola University	Bible Institute of Los Angeles	1981
Black River Technical College	Black River Vocational Technical School	
Bowie State University	Maryland State Normal School No. 3; Maryland Normal and Industrial School at Bowie for the Training of Colored Youths	1988
Bowling Green State University	Bowling Green State Normal School (1914–1929); Bowling Green State Normal College (1929–1935)	1935
Bradley University	Bradley Polytechnic Institute	1946
Brescia University	Brescia College	1998
Brigham Young University	Brigham Young Academy	1903
Brigham Young University Hawaii	Church College of Hawaii	1972
Brigham Young University Idaho	Bannock Stake Academy (1888–1898); Fremont Stake Academy (1898–1903); Ricks Academy (1903–1917); Ricks Normal College (1917–1923); Ricks College (1923–2001)	2001
Broward College	Broward Community College	2008
Brown Mackie College	Michiana College	2004
Brown University	College in the English Colony of Rhode Island & Providence Plantations; College of Rhode Island	
University at Buffalo	University of Western New-York (chartered by New York State in 1836, but never organized); University of Buffalo (1846–1962)	1962

== C ==
Current name	Former name(s)	Year of Change
Cabrini University	Cabrini College	2016
Cairn University	Philadelphia Bible Institute, Philadelphia College of Bible, Philadelphia Biblical University	1958, 2001, 2012
University of California, Berkeley	Agricultural, Mining, and Mechanical Arts College of Oakland (1866–1868); College of California (1868–1873)	1873
University of California, Davis	Northern Branch of the College of Agriculture	1959
University of California, Los Angeles	Southern Branch of the University of California	1927
California College of the Arts	California College of Arts and Crafts	
California Institute of Technology	Throop University; Throop Polytechnic Institute; Throop College of Technology	1893, 1913, 1920
California State Polytechnic University, Humboldt	Humboldt State Normal College; Humboldt State College; California State University, Humboldt; Humboldt State University	1913, 1935, 1972, 1974, 2022
California State University, East Bay	Almeda County State College; Almeda University; California State College at Hayward; California State University, Hayward	2007
California State University, Fresno	Fresno State Normal School	1972
California State University, Long Beach	Los Angeles-Orange County State College; Long Beach State College; California State College at Long Beach; California State College, Long Beach	1972
California State University, Los Angeles	Los Angeles State College	1964
California State University Maritime Academy	The California Maritime Academy	2015
California State University, Northridge	San Fernando Valley State College	1972
California University of Pennsylvania	California State Teachers College, Southwestern Normal School	1983
Campbellsville University	Russell Creek Academy; Campbellsville Junior College; Campbellsville College	1996
Cankdeska Cikana Community College	Little Hoop Community College	2005
Carnegie Mellon University	Carnegie Institute of Technology	1967
Case Western Reserve University	Case Institute of Technology; Western Reserve University	1967
Cecil College	Cecil Community College	2007
Centenary University	Centenary College	2016
University of Central Arkansas	State College of Arkansas; Arkansas State Teachers College; Arkansas State Normal School	1975
Central Baptist College	Central College	1962
University of Central Florida	Florida Technological University	1978
Central Georgia Technical College	Macon Technical College	2000
Central Michigan University	Central State Normal School	
University of Central Missouri	Central Missouri State University	2006
University of Central Oklahoma	Oklahoma Territorial Normal School; Central State Normal School; Central State College (Okla.)	1991
Central Washington University	Washington State Normal School; Central Washington College of Education; Central Washington State College	1977
Charleston Southern University	Baptist (South Carolina)	1991
Chancellor University	Dyke College, David N. Myers College	1995, 2008
Chester College of New England	White Pines College	2002
University of Charleston	Morris Harvey College	1979
Christopher Newport University	Christopher Newport College	1992
University of Cincinnati	McMiken University	1870
The Citadel, The Military College of South Carolina	South Carolina Military Academy, The Citadel Academy	1910
Clemson	Clemson Agricultural College	1950
Cleveland State University	Fenn College, The Cleveland State University	1964
Coleman University	Coleman College	2008
Colgate University	Baptist Education Society; Hamilton Literary and Theological Institution; Madison University	1890
CollegeAmerica	Northern Arizona College of Health Careers	
College of Coastal Georgia	Coastal Georgia Community College	2008
College of Idaho	Albertson College of Idaho (used from 1991 until October 2007)	2007
Collins College	Al Collins Graphic Design School	2001
Colorado Heights University	Teikyo Loretto Heights University	2009
Colorado Mesa University	Mesa State College	2011
Colorado State University	The State Agricultural College, Colorado Agricultural and Mechanical College	1910, 1957
Colorado State University–Pueblo	Southern Colorado Junior College, Pueblo Junior College, Southern Colorado State College, University of Southern Colorado	1937, 1961, 1975, 2003
Columbia International University	Columbia Bible College; Columbia Bible College and Seminary	1994
Columbia University	King's College; Columbia College	1896
Columbus State University	Columbus College	1996
Concordia College	Alabama Lutheran Academy & College	1980
Concordia University, Irvine	Christ College, Irvine	1993
Concordia University Chicago	Concordia University, River Forest; Concordia Teachers' College (1992)	2006
Cossatot Community College	Cossatot Vocational-Technical School; Cossatot Technical College	1991, 2001
Corban University	Phoenix Bible Institute (1935–1946); Western Baptist Bible College (1946–1973); Western Baptist College (1973–2005); Corban College (2005–2010)	2010
Crown College (Minnesota)	St. Paul Bible College	1992
Crown College (Tacoma)	Crown School of Hair Design	1994
University of the Cumberlands	Cumberland College	2005

== D ==
Current name	Former name(s)	Year of Change
Daymar College	Owensboro Business College	2001
Dakota State University	Madison Normal School; Eastern State Normal School; Dakota Normal School; Dakota State Normal School; General Beadle State College; Dakota State College	1989
Daytona State College	Daytona Beach College	2008
Delaware Valley University	National Farm School;National Agricultural College;Delaware Valley College of Science and Agriculture;Delaware Valley College	1948, 1960, 1989, 2014
DeSales University	Allentown College of St. Francis de Sales	2001
Diné College	Navajo Community College	1997
University of Detroit Mercy	University of Detroit and Mercy College of Detroit	1990
University of the District of Columbia	D.C. Teachers College merged with Federal City College	1977
Dominican University	Rosary College	1997
Dominican University of California	Dominican College	
Drexel University	Drexel Institute of Technology (1936–1970); Drexel Institute of Art, Science and Industry (1891–1936)	1970
Duke University	Trinity College (North Carolina)	1924
Dunlap-Stone University	International Import-Export Institute	2008

== E ==
Current name	Former name(s)	Year of Change
Eastern Arizona College	St. Joseph Stake Academy; Gila College; Eastern Arizona Junior College	
Eastern Florida State College	Brevard Community College, Brevard Junior College	2013
Eastern Illinois University	Eastern Illinois State Normal School	1957
Eastern Kentucky University	Central University (1874–1906), Eastern Kentucky State Normal School (1906–1922), Eastern Kentucky State Normal School and Teachers College (1922–1930), Eastern Kentucky State Teachers College (1930–1948), Eastern Kentucky State College (1948–1966)	1966
Eastern Michigan University	Eastern Michigan College; Michigan State Normal College; Michigan State Normal School	1959
Eastern Washington University	Benjamin J. Cheney Academy; State Normal School; Eastern Washington College of Education; Eastern Washington State College	1877
East Tennessee State University	East Tennessee State Normal School	
East Texas A&M University	East Texas Normal College, East Texas State Normal College, East Texas State Teachers College, East Texas State College, East Texas State University, Texas A&M University–Commerce	1889, 1923, 1957, 1962, 1996, 2024
Elmhurst University	Elmhurst College	2020
Elon University	Elon College	2001
Embry–Riddle Aeronautical University	Embry-Riddle School of Aviation; Embry-Riddle Aeronautical Institute	
Emporia State University	Kansas State Normal College; Kansas State Teachers College; Emporia Kansas State College	1977
University of Evansville	Moores Hill Male and Female Collegiate Institute; Moores Hill College; Evansville College	1967
Everest Institute	Duffs Business Institute	
Everest University	Florida Metropolitan University	2008
Excelsior College	Regents College of the University of the State of New York	2001

== F ==
Current name	Former name(s)	Year of Change
Fairleigh Dickinson University	FDU-Madison	
Fairmont State University	Fairmont State Normal School	2004
Faulkner University	Montgomery Bible School; Alabama Christian College	1985
Fitchburg State University	State Normal School in Fitchburg (1894–1932); State Teachers College at Fitchburg (1932–1960); State College at Fitchburg (1960–1965); Fitchburg State College (1965–2010)	2010
Florida Career College	Florida Computer and Business School	
Florida SouthWestern State College	Edison Community College (1972); Edison State College	2014
Florida State University	Florida State College for Women	1947
Fort Hays State University	Fort Hays Kansas State College	1977
Framingham State University	Normal School (1839–1845); State Normal School (1845–1932); State Teacher's College at Framingham (1932–1960); State College at Framingham (1960–1968); Framingham State College (1968–2010)	2010
Franklin Pierce University	Franklin Pierce College	2007

== G ==
Current name	Former name(s)	Year of Change
Gage Academy of Art	Seattle Academy of Art	2006
Gallaudet University	Gallaudet College; National Deaf-Mute College	1986, 1894
GateWay Community College	Maricopa Technical College	1987
George Fox University	Pacific College (1891–1949); George Fox College (1949–1996)	1949, 1996
George Mason University	University College; George Mason College of the University of Virginia	
George Washington University	Columbian College, Columbian University	1821, 1873, 1904
Georgia Piedmont Technical College	DeKalb Technical College	2011
Georgia Southern University	First District A&M; Georgia Normal School; South Georgia Teachers College; Georgia Teachers College	1924, 1929, 1939, 1959
Georgia State University	Georgia State College of Agriculture	1910
Globe University	Globe College	2007
Griggs University	The Fireside Correspondence School; Home Study Institute	

== H ==
Current name	Former name(s)	Year of Change
Hampton University	Hampton Normal and Agricultural Institute/Hampton Institute	1930/84
Harding University	Harding College	
Harrisburg University of Science and Technology	Harrisburg Polytechnic Institute	2003
Henderson State University	Arkadelphia Methodist College (1890–1904), Henderson College (1904–1911), Henderson-Brown College (1911–1929), Henderson State Teachers College (1929–1967), Henderson State College (1967–1975)	1975
Hendrix College	Central Institute (1876–1881), Central Collegiate Institute (1881–1889), Hendrix College (1889–1929), Hendrix-Henderson College (1929–1931), Trinity College (1931)	1931
Henry Ford College	Henry Ford Community College	2014
Heritage University	Heritage College	
Heritage Christian University	International Bible College	2001
Hodges University	International College	2007
Hollins University	Valley Union Seminary (1842–1855), Hollins Institute (1855–1911), Hollins College (1911–1998)	1998
University of Houston	Houston Junior College (1927–1934); University of Houston–University Park (1983–1991)	1934
University of Houston–Clear Lake	University of Houston at Clear Lake City (1971–1983)	1983
University of Houston–Downtown	University of Houston–Downtown College (1974–1983)	1983
Huntingdon College	Tuskegee Female College (1854–1872), Alabama Conference Female College (1872–1910), Woman's College of Alabama (1910–1934)	1934
Husson University	Husson College	2008

== I ==
Current name	Former name(s)	Year of Change
The College of Idaho	Albertson College of Idaho (1991–2007); The College of Idaho (1891–1991)	2007
Iḷisaġvik College	North Slope Higher Education Center; Arctic Sivunmun Iḷisaġvik College	
Illinois Benedictine College	St. Procopius College	1971
University of Illinois Chicago	University of Illinois at Chicago (1982-2020); University of Illinois at Chicago Circle (1965-1982)	1982, 2020
University of Illinois Urbana-Champaign	University of Illinois at Urbana-Champaign (1977-2020); University of Illinois (1885-1977); Illinois Industrial University (1867-1885)	1885, 1977, 2020
Illinois Institute of Technology	Armour Institute of Technology	1940
Illinois State University	Illinois St. Normal and Illinois Normal	1968
Immaculata University	Villa Maria College;Immaculata College	1929, 2002
Indiana Institute of Technology	Indiana Technical College	1963
Indiana University of Pennsylvania	Indiana Normal School;Indiana State Teachers College; Indiana State College	1920, 1959, 1965
Indiana Wesleyan University	Marion College	1988
Iowa State University	Iowa State College of Agriculture and Mechanic Arts	1959
Ivy Tech Community College	Indiana Vocational Technical College	1995
Ivy Tech State College		2005
University of Indianapolis	Indiana Central	1986
University of Iowa	State University of Iowa	1964

== J ==
Current name	Former name(s)	Year of Change
Jacksonville State University	Jacksonville State Teachers College; Jacksonville State College	1957, 1967
James Madison University	State Normal School for Women at Harrisonburg (until 1924), State Teachers College at Harrisonburg (1924 to 1938), Madison College (1938 to 1976)	1976
University of Jamestown	Jamestown College	2013
John Brown University	John E. Brown College	
John Carroll University	St. Ignatius College	1923
John Paul the Great Catholic University	The New Catholic University	2005
Johnson C. Smith University	Biddle University	1924
Johnson University	The School of the Evangelists (1895–1909); Johnson Bible College	2011
Judson College	Judson Female Institute	
Juilliard School	Institute of Musical Art; Juilliard School of Music	

== K ==
Current name	Former name(s)	Year of Change
Kansas State University	Kansas State College of Agriculture and Applied Science (Kansas State Agricultural College)	1959 (1931)
Kaplan Business Institute	ICM School of Business and Medical Careers	
Kaplan College	Hamilton College	
Kaplan College	Heritage College	
Kaplan College (Indiana)	Sawyer College	
Kalamazoo College	Michigan and Huron Institute	1855
Kean Jersey City	New Jersey State Normal School at Jersey City; New Jersey State Teachers College; Jersey City State; New Jersey City University	1998, 2026
Kean University	Newark Normal School; New Jersey State Normal School at Newark; Newark State College	1997
Kent State University	Ohio State Normal College at Kent; Kent State Normal School; Kent State Normal College; Kent State College	1911, 1915, 1929, 1935
Kent State University College of Podiatric Medicine	Ohio College of Podiatric Medicine	2012
Kettering University	The School of Automotive Trades (1919–1923); Flint Institute of Technology (1923–1926); General Motors Institute of Technology (1926–1932); General Motors Institute (1932–1982); GMI Engineering & Manufacturing Institute (1982–1998)	1998
University of Kentucky	Agricultural and Mechanical College of Kentucky (1865–1878)	1878
Kentucky Christian University	Christian Normal Institute	
Kentucky State University	State Normal School for Colored Persons (1887–1902); Kentucky Normal and Industrial Institute for Colored Persons (1902–1926); Kentucky State Industrial College for Colored Persons (1926–1938); Kentucky State College for Negroes (1938–1952); Kentucky State College (1952–1972)	1972
Kutztown University of Pennsylvania	Kutztown State Teachers College	1983

== L ==
Current name	Former name(s)	Year of Change
LaGrange College	LaGrange Female Academy; LaGrange Female College	1934
Lake Washington Institute of Technology	Lake Washington Technical College	2011
Lamar University	Lamar Tech	1971
Lenoir-Rhyne University	Lenoir College (1891), Lenoir-Rhyne College (1928)	2008
Lewis and Clark College	Albany Collegiate Institute (1873–1939); Albany College (1939–1942)	1942
Lewis-Clark State College	Lewiston State Normal School	1971
Liberty University	Lynchburg Baptist; Liberty Baptist	1984
Linfield University	Linfield College; McMinnville College; Oregon City College; Baptist College at McMinnville	1848–1849, 1858–1922, 1922–2020
Lincoln College of Technology: Denver	Denver Automotive and Diesel College	
Lipscomb University	David Lipscomb University (1988–2005); David Lipscomb College (1918–1988); Nashville Bible School (1891–1918)	2005
Lone Star College–CyFair	Cy-Fair College	2007
Lone Star College–Kingwood	Kingwood College	2007
Lone Star College–Montgomery	Montgomery College	2007
Lone Star College–North Harris	North Harris College	2007
Lone Star College–Tomball	Tomball College	2007
Longwood University	Farmville Female College; Longwood College	2004
University of Louisiana at Lafayette	Southwestern Louisiana Industrial Institute (1900–1921), Southwestern Louisiana Institute (1921–1960), University of Southwestern Louisiana (1960–1999)	1999
University of Louisiana at Monroe	Northeast Louisiana	1999
Lourdes University	Lourdes College	2011
Loyola Marymount University	Loyola U. of L.A. and Marymount College	1973
LSU New Orleans	Louisiana State University in New Orleans, University of New Orleans	1974, 2026
Luna Community College	Luna Vocational Technical Institute	2000
Lynn University	College of Boca Raton	1991
Lyon College	Arkansas College	1994

== M ==
Current name	Former name(s)	Year of Change
University of Maine	University of Maine at Orono	1986
Manchester University	Manchester College [Indiana]	2012
Manhattan University	Manhattan College	2024
Mannes College The New School for Music	The David Mannes Music School; Mannes Music School; Mannes College of Music	
Marist University	Marist Normal Training School (1929–1946); Marian College (1946–1960); Marist College (1960–2025)	2025
State University of New York Maritime College	N.Y. Maritime	
Marycrest International University	Teikyo Marycrest	
University of Maryland Eastern Shore	Maryland State College	1970
University of Maryland	Maryland State College of Agriculture	1910
University of Mary Washington	State Normal and Industrial School for Women; Mary Washington College	2005
University of Massachusetts Amherst	Massachusetts St.; Massachusetts Agriculture Col.; Massachusetts College of Agriculture	1947, 1925
Massachusetts Institute of Technology	Massachusetts Institute of Technology and Boston Society of Natural History, Boston Tech	1865, 1916
Massachusetts College of Liberal Arts	North Adams State College	1997
University of Massachusetts Dartmouth	Southeastern Mass.	1991
University of Massachusetts Lowell	University of Lowell	1991
McDaniel College	Western Maryland College	2002
Massachusetts College of Pharmacy and Health Sciences	MCPHS University	2013
University of Memphis	West Tennessee State Normal School; Memphis State University	1994
Methodist University	Methodist College	2006
University of Michigan	Catholepistemiad of Detroit or University of Michigania	1837
Michigan State University	Agricultural College of the State of Michigan (1855–1861); State Agricultural College (1861–1909); Michigan Agricultural College (1909–1925); Michigan State College of Agriculture and Applied Science (1925–1955); Michigan State University of Agriculture and Applied Science (1955–1964)	1964
Mid-Atlantic Christian University	Roanoke Bible College	2009
Middlebury Institute of International Studies at Monterey	Monterey Institute of International Studies	2014
Midway University	Midway College	2015
Miles College	Miles Memorial College	1941
Minnesota State University, Mankato	Mankato Teachers; Mankato St.	1998
Minnesota State University Moorhead	Moorhead St.; Moorhead Teachers	2000
Missouri State University	Southwest Missouri State	2005
Missouri University of Science and Technology	University of Missouri – Rolla	2008
Mississippi State University	Mississippi Agricultural and Mechanical College	1910
Missouri Valley University	Missouri Valley College	2026
Mitchell Hamline School of Law	William Mitchell College of Law and Hamline University School of Law merged	2015
University of Mobile	Mobile College	1993
University of Montevallo	Alabama Girls' Industrial School (1896–1911); Alabama Girls' Technical Institute (1911–1919); Alabama Girls' Technical Institute and College for Women (1919–1923); Alabama College, State College for Women (1923–1956); Alabama College (1956–1969)	1969
Montana State University	Montana College of Agricultural and Mechanical Arts	1930
Montana State University - Billings	Eastern Montana	1994
Montana State University - Northern	Northern Montana	1994
Montclair State University	Montclair Normal School	1994
Mount St. Joseph University	College of Mount St. Joseph	2014
University of Mount Union	Mount Union Seminary (1846–1853); Mount Union College (1853–2010)	2010
Multnomah University	Multnomah School of the Bible (1936–1993); Multnomah Bible College (1993–2008)	2008
Murray State University	Murray State Normal School (1923–1926); Murray State Normal School and Teachers College (1926–1930); Murray State Teachers College (1930–1948); Murray State College (1948–1966)	1966
Miami Dade College	Miami Dade Community College	2003

== N ==
Current name	Former name(s)	Year of Change
National Park Community College	Garland County Community College (1973) merged with Quapaw Technical Institute (1969)	2003
University of Nebraska at Kearney	Nebraska State Normal School at Kearney; Kearney State College	1991
University of Nebraska at Omaha	Omaha	1968
Neumann University	Our Lady of Angels College (1965–1980); Neumann College (1980–2009)	2009
Nevada State University	Nevada State College	2023
University of New England, Maine	St. Francis	1978
The College of New Jersey	New Jersey State Normal School (1855); New Jersey State Normal School at Trenton (1908); New Jersey State Teachers College and State Normal School at Trenton (1929); New Jersey State Teachers College at Trenton (1937); Trenton State College (1958)	1996
New Jersey Institute of Technology	Newark College of Engineering (NCE)	1975
New Mexico State University	New Mexico College of Agriculture and Mechanic Arts; New Mexico A&M	1935
The New School	The New School for Social Research; New School University	1997, 2005
Norfolk State University	Norfolk State College	1979
University of North Alabama	LaGrange College (1830–1854); Florence Wesleyan University (1854–1872); State Normal School at Florence (1872–1889); State Normal College (1889–1913); State Normal School (1913–1929); Florence State Teachers College (1929–1957); Florence State College (1957–1967); Florence State University (1967–1974)	1974
North Carolina Central University	North Carolina College	1969
North Dakota State University	North Dakota Agricultural College	1935
North Idaho College	Coeur d'Alene Junior College; North Idaho Junior College	1971
Northland Community & Technical College	Northwest Technical College (Minnesota)	2003
Northwest Florida State College	Okaloosa-Walton Community College	2008
Northwest Nazarene University	Northwest Nazarene College	2000
University of North Carolina at Charlotte	Charlotte College	1965
University of North Carolina at Pembroke	Pembroke State	1996
North Carolina State University	North Carolina College of Agriculture and Mechanic Arts	1935
North Central College	North-Western	1926
North Central Texas College	Cooke County College	1994
University of North Georgia	consolidation of Gainesville State College and North Georgia College & State University	2013
University of North Texas	North Texas State University	1988
Northeastern Illinois University	Northeastern Illinois State College	1971
Northeastern State University	Northeastern Oklahoma State	1985
Northwestern State University	Louisiana State Normal College	1970
Northern Arizona University	Northern Arizona Normal School; Northern Arizona State Teachers' College; Arizona State Teachers' College of Flagstaff; Arizona State College of Flagstaff	1966
University of Northern Colorado	State Normal School of Colorado; Colorado State College	1970
Notre Dame of Maryland University	Notre Dame of Maryland Preparatory School and Collegiate Institute(1837–1897); College of Notre Dame of Maryland	2011

== O ==
Current name	Former name(s)	Year of Change
Oakwood University	Oakwood Industrial School; Oakwood Manual Training School; Oakwood Junior College; Oakwood College	2007
Oklahoma State University	Oklahoma Agricultural and Mechanical College	1957
Old Dominion University	William & Mary (Norfolk)	1962
Oregon State University	Corvallis Academy, 1856; Corvallis College, 1868*; State Agricultural College, 1876; Corvallis State Agricultural College, 1881; Oregon State Agricultural College, 1882; State Agricultural College of Oregon, 1886; Oregon Agricultural College, 1889; Oregon State Agricultural College, 1927 *Officially Chartered	1961
University of Oregon	Oregon State University (unofficially "State University")	1880
Orion College	Allied Health Institute	
Otterbein University	Otterbein College	2010
Ouachita Baptist University	Ouachita Baptist College	1965
Ozarka College	Ozarka Vocational-Technical School; Ozarka Technical College	1999
University of the Ozarks	Cane Hill College; Arkansas Cumberland College; College of the Ozarks	1987

== P ==
Current name	Former name(s)	Year of Change
Pacific College of Health and Science	Pacific College of Oriental Medicine	2020
Paradise Valley Community College	Northeast Valley Education Center	
Parker University	Parker College of Chiropractic	2011
Parsons The New School for Design	Chase School (1896–1898); New York School of Art (1898–1909); New York School of Fine and Applied Art (1909–1936); Parsons School of Design (1936–1970)	1970
Pepperdine University	George Pepperdine	
Penn Foster College	ICS Center for Degree Studies	
Pennsylvania College of Art and Design	Pennsylvania School of the Arts	2003
Pennsylvania College of Technology	Williamsport Technical Institute; Williamsport Area Community College	1989
University of Pennsylvania	Academy of Philadelphia; College of Philadelphia; University of the State of Pennsylvania	1791
Philadelphia Biblical University	Philadelphia College of the Bible	
University of the Sciences in Philadelphia	Philadelphia Pharmacy	1998
Philadelphia University	Philadelphia Textile School, Philadelphia College of Textiles & Science	1961, 1999
Philander Smith University	Walden Seminary; Philander Smith College	1882, 2023
University of Pikeville	Pikeville Collegiate Institute; Pikeville College	2011
Pima Community College	Pima College	1972
University of Pittsburgh	Western University of Pennsylvania	1908
Point University	Atlanta Christian College	2011
Polytechnic University of New York	New York Poly; Brooklyn Poly	
Portland State University	Portland State College; Vanport Extension	1969
Post University	Teikyo Post; Post	1990
Princeton University	College of New Jersey; unofficially Nassau Hall	1896
University of Providence	University of Great Falls	2017

== R ==
Current name	Former name(s)	Year of Change
Radford University	State Normal and Industrial School for Women at Radford (1910–1924); State Teachers College at Radford (1924–1943); Women's Division of the Virginia Polytechnic Institute (1943–1964); Radford College (1964–1979)	1979
Randolph College	Randolph Macon Woman's College	2006
Rasmussen College	Aakers College	2007
Rasmussen College	Webster College	2007
Regent University	CBN University (1978–1990)	1990
Rhodes College	Masonic University of Tennessee; Montgomery Masonic College; Stewart College; Southwestern Presbyterian University; Southwestern; Southwestern at Memphis	1984
William Marsh Rice University	Rice Institute	1960
Rochester Institute of Technology	Rochester Athenaeum; Mechanics Institute	1847, 1944
University of the Rockies	Colorado School of Professional Psychology	2007
Roger Williams University	Roger Williams Junior College; Roger Williams College	1992
Roseman University of Health Sciences	University of Southern Nevada	2011
Rowan University	Glassboro Normal School; Glassboro St.; Rowan College of New Jersey	1997
Rutgers, The State University of New Jersey	Queens College	1825
Rutgers, The State University of New Jersey–Camden	College of South Jersey & South Jersey Law School	1950
Rutgers, The State University of New Jersey–Newark	University of Newark	1945

== S ==
Current name	Former name(s)	Year of Change
St. Andrews University (North Carolina), a branch of Webber International University	St. Andrews Presbyterian College	2011
Saint Augustine's University (listed in Wikipedia as St. Augustine's University), North Carolina	Saint Augustine's College	2012
Saint Paul's College, Virginia	Saint Paul Normal and Industrial School; Saint Paul's Polytechnic Institute	1957
Saint Peter's University	Saint Peter's College	2012
Salem International University	Salem-Teikyo; Salem	2000
Salus University	Pennsylvania College of Optometry (one of four colleges combined to found Salus)	2008
Salem State University	Salem State College, State College at Salem, State Teachers College at Salem, Salem Normal School	2010, 1968, 1960, 1932
Samford University	Howard College	
Samuel Merritt University	Samuel Merritt College	
San Diego State University	San Diego Normal School; San Diego State College, California State University- San Diego	
Sanford-Brown College	Sanford-Brown Institute	2014
San Jose State University	California State University-San Jose; San Jose State College; San Jose State Teachers College; San Jose State Normal School; California State Normal School; Minns School	1974
Santa Fe University of Art and Design	College of Santa Fe; St. Michael's College	2010, 1966
Schoolcraft College	Northwest Wayne County Community College	1963
The Seattle School of Theology & Psychology	Mars Hill Graduate School	2011
Seattle University	Seattle College	1948
Selma University	Alabama Baptist Normal and Theological School; Alabama Baptist Colored University	1908
Seton Hill University	Seton Hill Junior College (1914–1918); Seton Hill College (1918–2002)	2002
Shenandoah University	Shenandoah College	1991
Shimer College	Frances Shimer College; Frances Shimer Junior College; Frances Shimer School; Frances Shimer Academy of the University of Chicago; Mount Carroll Seminary	1950, 1942, 1932, 1910, 1896
Shippensburg University of Pennsylvania	Shippensburg State College; Shippensburg State Teachers College; State Teachers College at Shippensburg; Cumberland Valley State Normal School	1983, 1960, 1939, 1927
Shorter College (Arkansas)	Bethel University	
University of Silicon Valley	Cogswell Technical School (1887–1930) Cogswell Polytechnical College (1930–2021)	1930, 2021
Slippery Rock University of Pennsylvania	Slippery Rock State College; Slippery Rock State Teachers College; Slippery Rock State Normal School	1983, 1960, 1926
Sofia University	Institute of Transpersonal Psychology	2012
Southeast Arkansas College	Pines Technical College	1998
Southeastern University	Southeastern College of the Assemblies of God	2005
Southern Arkansas University	Third District Agricultural School; Agricultural and Mechanical College, Third District; Southern State College	1976
Southern Arkansas University Tech	Southwest Technical Institute	1975
University of South Carolina	South Carolina College	1906
Southern Connecticut State University	Connecticut Agricultural College	1910
South Dakota State University	South Dakota College of Agricultural and Mechanical Arts	1935
University of Southern Indiana	Indiana State University-Evansville	1985
University of Southern Maine	Maine Portland-Gorham; Gorham St. (Me.)	1968
University of Southern Mississippi	Mississippi Normal College; State Teachers College; Mississippi Southern College	1962
Southeast Missouri State University	Southeast Missouri State Normal School	
Southern New Hampshire University	New Hampshire School of Accounting and Secretarial Science; New Hampshire College of Accounting and Commerce; New Hampshire College	1961, 1969, 2001
Southern Oregon University	Southern Oregon State Normal School	
Southern University	Southern Baton Rouge	1974
Southern Utah University	Branch Normal School; Branch Agricultural College; College of Southern Utah; Southern Utah State College	1991
Southwest Minnesota State University	Southwest State	2003
Stanford University	Leland Stanford Junior University (current legal name)	
Stevenson University	Villa Julie College	2008
Stockton University	Stockton College, Richard Stockton College of New Jersey	1993, 2015
Strayer University	Strayer's Business College; Strayer College	
SUNY Adirondack	Adirondack Community College	2010

== T ==
Current name	Former name(s)	Year of Change
Tarleton State University	John Tarleton College, John Tarleton Agricultural College, Tarleton State College	1899, 1917, 1949, 1973
Taylor University-Fort Wayne	Summit Christian College	1980
University of Tennessee at Chattanooga	Chattanooga University	1969
The University of Texas at Arlington	Arlington State College	1967
The University of Texas at Austin	The University of Texas (1883–1967)	1967
The University of Texas at El Paso	Texas Western College of the University of Texas	1967
The University of Texas Rio Grande Valley	Pan American University, formed from merger of The University of Texas–Pan American and The University Texas at Brownsville	2015
Texas A&M International University	Texas A&I University at Laredo, Laredo State University	1969, 1977, 1993
Texas A&M University	Agricultural and Mechanical College of Texas	1963
Texas A&M University–Corpus Christi	University of Corpus Christi, Texas A&I University at Corpus Christi, Corpus Christi State University	1947, 1963, 1971, 1993
Texas A&M University at Galveston	Nautical School, Texas Maritime Academy	1931, 1971, 1981
Texas A&M University–Kingsville	South Texas Normal School, South Texas State Teachers College, Texas College of Arts & Industries, Texas A&I University	1917, 1925, 1967, 1989
Texas Southmost College	The Junior College of the Lower Rio Grande Valley, The University of Texas at Brownsville – Texas Southmost College,	1931, 1991, 2011
Texas State University	Southwest Texas State Normal School (1903–1918); Southwest Texas State Normal College (1918–1923); Southwest Texas State Teachers College (1923–1959); Southwest Texas State College (1959–1969); Southwest Texas State University (1969–2003); Texas State University–San Marcos (2003–2013)	2013
Texas Tech University	Texas Technological College	1969
Thomas More University	Villa Madonna College, Thomas More College	1968, 2018
Thunderbird School of Global Management	American Institute for Foreign Trade (1946–1968); Thunderbird Graduate School of International (1968–1973) Management; American Graduate School of International Management (1973–1997); Thunderbird, The American Graduate School of International Management (1997–2004); Garvin School of International Management (2004–2007)	2007
Towson University	Towson State University	1997
Transylvania University	Transylvania University (1780–1865), Kentucky University (via merger, 1865–1908)	1908
Trident University International	Touro College; TUI University; Trident University	
Trine University	Tri-State University	2009
Troy University	Troy Normal School (1887–1929); Troy State Teachers College (1929–1957); Troy State College (1957–1967); Troy State University (1967–2004)	2004
Truman State University	North Missouri Normal and Commercial School; North Missouri Normal School; North Missouri Normal School of the First District; Northeast Missouri State Teachers College; Northeast Missouri State College; Northeast Missouri State University	1995
Tulane University	Medical College of Louisiana; The University of Louisiana	
University of Tulsa	Henry Kendall College	1920
Tuskegee University	Tuskegee Institute, Tuskegee Normal and Industrial Institute	1910, 1920

== U-V ==
Current name	Former name(s)	Year of Change
Union Institute & University	The Union for Research and Experimentation in Higher Education; The University Without Walls; The Union Institute	2001
University of Utah	University of Deseret	
Utah State University	Agricultural College of Utah; Carbon College; College of Eastern Utah	
Utah Tech University	Dixie State University	2021
Utah Valley University	Central Utah Vocational School; Utah Trade Technical Institute; Utah Technical College at Provo; Utah Valley Community College; Utah Valley State College	2008
Valparaiso University	Valparaiso Male and Female College; Northern Indiana Normal School and Business Institute; Valparaiso College	1906
University of Vermont	University of Vermont and State Agricultural College	Current
Vermont State University	Johnson State College (1828); Lyndon State College (1911); Northern Vermont University (2018)	2023
Virginia Intermont College	Southwest Virginia Institute	
Virginia Polytechnic Institute and State University or "Virginia Tech"	Virginia Agricultural and Mechanical College and Polytechnic Institute; Virginia Polytechnic Institute	1930, 1970
Virginia State University	Virginia Normal and Industrial School	1979
Voorhees University	Voorhees School and Junior College; Voorhees College	1962, 2022

== W–Z ==
Current name	Former name(s)	Year of Change
Wallace Community College	George C Wallace Community College	
Washburn University	Lincoln College	
Washington and Lee University	Washington College	1870
Washington University in St. Louis	Washington Institute, Eliot Seminary	1854, 1857
University of Washington	Territorial University of Washington	1889
Washington State University	State College of Washington; Washington Agricultural College	1935, 1959
Wayne State University	Wayne University	
Waynesburg University	Waynesburg College	2007
Weber State University	Weber Stake Academy (1889–1902); Weber Academy (1902–1918); Weber Normal College (1918–1922); Weber College (1922–1962); Weber State College (1962–1991)	1991
University of West Alabama	Livingston Female Academy; Livingston Normal College; Livingston State Teachers College; Livingston State College; Livingston University	1995
West Chester University of Pennsylvania	West Chester State College; West Chester State Teachers College; West Chester Normal School	1983, 1960, 1927
West Texas A&M University	West Texas State Normal College, West Texas State Teachers College, West Texas State College, West Texas State University, West Texas St.	1914, 1922, 1949, 1963, 1993
Western Career College	Silicon Valley College	
Western Colorado University	Colorado Normal; Western State College of Colorado; Western Colorado State University	1923, 2012, 2018
Western Illinois University	Western Illinois Normal School	
Western Michigan University	Western Michigan College, Western Michigan College of Education, Western State Teachers College, Western State Normal School	1957, 1955, 1941, 1927
Western New England University	Western New England College	2011
Western New Mexico University	New Mexico Western University	
Western Oregon University	Western Oregon State College, Oregon College of Education, Oregon Normal School, Oregon State Normal School, Christian College, Monmouth University	1997
Westfield State University	Westfield State Normal School; Westfield State College	2010
Westmar University	Western Union College; Teikyo Westmar	1995
West Virginia University at Parkersburg	Parkersburg Branch of West Virginia University; Parkersburg Community College	1971, 1989
Wichita State University	Fairmount College (1886–1926); Municipal University of Wichita (1926–1964)	1964
Widener University	Pennsylvania Military College	1979
William James College	Massachusetts School of Professional Psychology	2015
William Paterson University	Paterson State College	1997
William Peace University	Peace College	2012
Williams Baptist University	Southern Baptist College; Williams Baptist College	1991, 2018
Winston-Salem State University	Slater Industrial and State Normal School	
University of Wisconsin–Eau Claire	Eau Claire Teachers	1971
University of Wisconsin–La Crosse	La Crosse Teachers	1971
University of Wisconsin–River Falls	River Falls Teachers	1971
University of Wisconsin–Superior	Superior Normal; Superior State Teachers	1971
Xavier University	The Athenaeum; St. Xavier College	
Yale University	The Collegiate School; Yale College	1971

== See also ==
- List of American institutions of higher education
- List of colloquial names for universities and colleges in the United States
- List of university and college mergers in the United States
- List of university and college nickname changes in the United States
