= List of university and college mergers in the United States =

This is a list of mergers of universities and/or colleges in the United States with the name of the surviving institution, predecessors, and effective date.

== A through D ==
- Albany State University absorbed Darton State College, 2016
- Alderson Broaddus University – merger of Alderson Academy and Broaddus Institute, 1932
- Alliant International University – merger of California School of Professional Psychology and United States International University, 2001
- American Sentinel University – merger of American College of Computer & Information Sciences and American Graduate School of Management
- Argosy University – merger of American Schools of Professional Psychology, the University of Sarasota and the Medical Institute of Minnesota, 2001
- University of Arizona – acquired Ashford University, 2021
- University of Arkansas – acquired Grantham University
- Azusa Pacific College – absorbed Arlington College, 1968
- Azusa Pacific College – merger of Azusa College and Los Angeles Pacific College, 1965
- Aurora University – absorbed George Williams College (Chicago), 2000
- University of Baltimore – absorbed Eastern College, 1970
- Benedictine College – merger of Mount Saint Scholastica College and St. Benedict's College – 1971
- Big Sandy Community and Technical College – merger of Prestonsburg Community College and Mayo Technical College.
- Birmingham–Southern College – merger of Southern University (Alabama) and Birmingham College in 1918.
- Boston University School of Medicine – absorbed Boston Female Medical School, 1874
- Boston College absorbed Pine Manor College, 2020
- Boston University – merger of Boston University School of Education and Wheelock College of Education and Human Development, 2017
- Brevard College – merger of Brevard Institute, Weaverville College, and Rutherford College, 1934
- Brown University – merged with Pembroke College, 1971
- University of California, Berkeley – merger of the College of California and the Agricultural, Mining, and Mechanical Arts College, 1853
- Carnegie Mellon University – formed by the merger of Carnegie Institute of Technology and the Mellon Institute of Industrial Research
- Carson-Newman University – merger of Carson College and Newman College for Women, 1889
- Case Western Reserve University – merger of Case Tech and Western Reserve, 1967
- The Catholic University of America – absorbed Columbus University, 1954
- Central Nazarene College – absorbed Nazarene Bible Institute (1911)
- Chicago College of Performing Arts – absorbed Roosevelt University School of Music, 1954
- University of Cincinnati – absorbed Medical College of Ohio 1896; Cincinnati Law School, absorbed 1896; Cincinnati College of Pharmacy, 1954; Cincinnati College-Conservatory of Music, absorbed in 1962.
- Cincinnati College-Conservatory of Music – formed by merger of Cincinnati Conservatory of Music and the College of Music of Cincinnati in 1955.
- Cincinnati Law School absorbed Cincinnati College in the late 1830s.
- Clark Atlanta University – merger of Clark College and Atlanta University, 1988
- Cleveland State University – absorbed Cleveland-Marshall College of Law in 1969
- Commonwealth University of Pennsylvania - merger of Mansfield University, Bloomsburg University, and Lock Haven University, 2022
- Cornell University – absorbed New York Hospital Training School for Nurses, 1942
- Daniel Webster College – acquired by ITT Educational Services Inc. in 2009
- Davenport University – merger of Davenport College, Detroit College of Business, and Great Lakes College, 2000.
- University of Delaware – merger of Newark College and Women's College of Delaware, 1921
- Delaware State University acquired Wesley College, 2021
- University of Denver – absorbed Colorado Women's College, 1982
- DePaul University – absorbed Barat College, 2001
- University of Detroit Mercy – merger of University of Detroit and Mercy College, 1990
- Dillard University – merger of Straight University and New Orleans University, 1934

== E through K ==
- Emerson College – absorbed Marlboro College, 2020
- Erskine College – absorbed Due West Female College, 1927
- Fordham University – absorbed Marymount College, 2002
- Gannon University – absorbed Villa Marie College, 1989
- The George Washington University – absorbed Mount Vernon College for Women, 1999; absorbed Benjamin Franklin University, 1987; absorbed National University, 1954
- Georgia Health Sciences University (formerly the Medical College of Georgia) merged with Augusta State University, 2012, to form Georgia Regents University (later renamed Augusta University)
- Georgia Southern University – absorbed Armstrong State University, 2018
- Gordon College (Massachusetts) – absorbed Barrington College (1985)
- Hamilton College – absorbed Kirkland College, 1978
- Hannibal-LaGrange College (now Hannibal-LaGrange University) – merger of LaGrange College and Hannibal College, 1928
- Harvard University – signed merger with Radcliffe College in 1977; completed merger in 1999
- University of Hartford – merger of Hartford Art School, Hartt College of Music, and Hillyer College, 1957
- Hendrix College – absorbed Henderson-Brown College, 1929; absorbed Galloway Women's College, 1933
- Hope International University – merged with Nebraska Christian College, 2016
- University of Houston–Downtown – assets were acquired from South Texas Junior College, 1974
- Houghton College – absorbed United Wesleyan College, 1989
- University of Illinois at Chicago – absorbed the John Marshall Law School, 2019
- Illinois Institute of Technology – merger of Armour Institute of Technology and Lewis Institute, 1940; absorbed Institute of Design, 1949; absorbed Chicago-Kent College of Law, 1969; absorbed Midwest College of Engineering, 1986
- Indiana University Purdue University Indianapolis – merger of Indiana University School of Medicine, Indiana University Robert H. McKinney School of Law, Indiana University School of Dentistry, Indiana University Herron School of Art, Indiana University Indianapolis Extension, and Purdue University Indianapolis Extension, 1969
- Johnson University – absorbed Florida Christian College, 2013
- Kansas State University – absorbed Kansas College of Technology, 1991
- Kennesaw State University - absorbed Southern Polytechnic State University, 2015

== L through M ==
- University of Kentucky – absorbed the Louisville College of Pharmacy in 1947.
- University of La Verne – absorbed San Fernando Valley College of Law, 1983
- Lawson State Community College – absorbed Bessemer State Technical College, 2005.
- LeMoyne-Owen College -merger of LeMoyne College and S. A. Owen Junior College in 1968
- Luther College – absorbed Decorah College for Women, 1936
- Long Island University – absorbed Brooklyn College of Pharmacy, 1976
- Loyola University Chicago – absorbed Mundelein College, Chicago, 1991
- Loyola Marymount University – merger of Marymount College and Loyola University, 1973
- Loyola University Maryland – absorbed Mount Saint Agnes College, 1971
- Loyola University New Orleans – absorbed College of the Immaculate Conception, 1911; absorbed New Orleans College of Pharmacy, 1919
- Macon State College and Middle Georgia College merger to form Middle Georgia State College, 2013 (now Middle Georgia State University)
- Mannes College of Music – absorbed Chatham Square Music School
- Martin Luther College – merger of Dr. Martin Luther College and Northwestern College (Wisconsin), 1995
- University of Maryland, Baltimore – absorbed Baltimore College, 1830
- University of Massachusetts Boston – absorbed Boston State College, 1982
- University of Massachusetts Dartmouth – merger of Bradford Durfee College of Technology and New Bedford Institute of Technology, 1964; absorbed Southern New England School of Law, 2010
- University of Massachusetts Lowell – merger of Lowell State College and Lowell Technological Institute, 1975–76
- University of Memphis – acquired Lambuth University campus, 2011
- Mercer University – absorbed Tift College, 1986
- Miami University – absorbed Oxford College of Music and Art, 1928; absorbed Western College, 1974
- Michigan Technological University – absorbed the nursing program of Finlandia University, 2023
- Middlebury College – affiliated then acquired the Monterey Institute of International Studies (MIIS), now a graduate school, 2010
- Millsaps College – absorbed Grenada College, 1936; absorbed Whitworth College, 1938
- Morningside College – absorbed Charles City College, 1914
- Montclair State University – absorbed Bloomfield College, 2023

== N through R ==
- National College – acquired Kentucky College of Business and absorbed Fugazzi College.
- National Louis University – acquired the assets of Kendall College, 2018
- University of Nevada, Reno merged with Sierra Nevada University, 2022
- University of New England – merged with Westbrook College, 1996.
- The New School (then the New School for Social Research) – absorbed Parsons School of Design in 1970; absorbed Mannes College of Music in 1989.
- New York University – acquired Bellevue Hospital Medical College in 1898; acquired New York College of Dentistry in 1925; acquired Polytechnic University in 2008, merged in 2014
- Northeastern University – absorbed Bouve College in 1964
- Northeastern University – acquired Mills College in 2022
- North Central College acquired Shimer College, June 1, 2017
- North Georgia College & State University and Gainesville State College merge, to form the University of North Georgia, 2012
- Nova Southeastern University – merger of Nova University and Southeastern University of the Health Sciences, 1994
- Pace University – absorbed Briarcliff College, 1977; merged with College of White Plains (formerly Good Counsel College), 1975
- Pennsylvania Western University - formed by the merger of California University of Pennsylvania, Clarion University of Pennsylvania, and Edinboro University of Pennsylvania, 2022
- Pennsylvania State University – absorbed Dickinson School of Law, 2000
- Phillips Community College of the University of Arkansas – absorbed the Rice Belt Technical Institute, 1996
- Piedmont International University – absorbed Tennessee Temple University in 2015, Southeastern Bible College (Birmingham, Alabama) in 2017, and John Wesley University in 2018
- Polytechnic University – absorbed NYU School of Engineering and Science, 1973
- University of Portland – absorbed Multnomah College, 1969
- Purdue University – acquired Kaplan University, 2017
- Purdue University Northwest – consolidation of Purdue Calumet and Purdue North Central, 2016
- Radford University - absorbed Jefferson College of Health Sciences, 2019
- Regis University – absorbed Loretto Heights College, 1988
- Rich Mountain Community College – formed by the merger of Rich Mountain Vocational-Technical School and the off-campus program of Henderson State University, 1983
- Roosevelt University – acquired Robert Morris University Illinois campuses, 2020
- Rutgers University – absorbed University of Newark, 1947

== S through Z ==
- College of St. Catherine – absorbed St. Mary's Junior College, 1986
- Saint Joseph's merger with University of the Sciences, 2021
- University of San Diego – absorbed San Diego College for Women, 1972
- Shimer College acquired by North Central College, June 1, 2017
- South Arkansas Community College – merger of Southern Arkansas University, El Dorado Branch and Oil Belt Technical College, 1992
- Southern Benedictine College – merger of Saint's Bernard College and Cullman College, 1976
- Southern Nazarene University – absorbed Peniel College (1920), Central Nazarene College (1929), Arkansas Holiness College (1931), Bresee Theological College (1940)
- Southern New Hampshire University absorbed Notre Dame College, 2002; absorbed Daniel Webster College, 2017
- St. John's University (New York City) College of Business – absorbed the College of Insurance – 2001
- South Georgia College and Waycross College merger to form South Georgia State College, 2012
- Southwestern University – merger of Rutersville College, Wesleyan College, McKenzie College, and Soule University, 1873
- College of Staten Island – merger of Staten Island Community College (SICC) and Richmond College, 1976
- University of Tennessee at Chattanooga – merger of the University of Chattanooga, University of Tennessee, and Chattanooga City College, 1969
- Tennessee State University – absorbed University of Tennessee at Nashville, 1979
- Tufts University – absorbed School of the Museum of Fine Arts, Boston, 2016
- The University of Texas Rio Grande Valley – consolidation of The University of Texas–Pan American and The University of Texas at Brownsville, 2015
- The University of Texas at San Antonio – absorbed the Southwest School of Art in 2022
- Thomas Jefferson University – merged with Philadelphia University, 2017
- University of Toledo – merger with Medical University of Ohio, 2006
- Transylvania University
  - Merged with Kentucky University, 1865, adopting the latter school's name (Transylvania name restored in 1908)
  - Absorbed Hamilton College (Kentucky), 1903
- Trenholm State Technical College – Formed by a merger between H. Councill Treholm State Technical College and John M. Patterson State Technical College, 2002/2003.
- Trinity University (Texas) – absorbed University of San Antonio, 1942
- Union College (Kentucky) – absorbed Sue Bennett College, 1997
- Union Theological Seminary (New York) – absorbed Episcopal Divinity School, 2017
- Vanderbilt University – absorbed Peabody College, 1979
- Virginia Commonwealth University – merger of Richmond Professional Institute and Medical College of Virginia
- Virginia Tech – absorbed Virginia Tech Carilion School of Medicine and Research Institute, 2018.
- Virginia Union University – absorbed Hartshorn Memorial College, 1932
- Washington & Jefferson College – merger of Washington College in Washington, Pennsylvania and Jefferson College in Canonsburg, Pennsylvania, 1865
- Wayne State University (then Wayne University) – formed by the merger of Detroit City College, Detroit Teachers College and Detroit Medical College
- University of West Los Angeles – absorbed the San Fernando Valley College of Law in 2002
- Willamette University – absorbed Pacific Northwest College of Art in 2021
- Xavier University (Cincinnati) – absorbed Edgecliff College in 1980

== See also ==
- List of American institutions of higher education
- List of colloquial names for universities and colleges in the United States
- List of university and college name changes in the United States
- List of university and college nickname changes in the United States
