= Crown College =

Crown College is the name of several schools in the United States:

- Crown College, University of California, Santa Cruz, a residential college
- Crown College (Minnesota), a private college in Carver County, Minnesota (St. Bonifacius address)
- Crown College (Tennessee), a Baptist Bible college and seminary in Powell, Tennessee
- Crown College (Washington), a defunct for-profit college
