= Edgecliff College =

Private Catholic women's college in Cincinnati, Ohio, U.S. (1935-1980)

- Edgecliff
- U.S. National Register of Historic Places
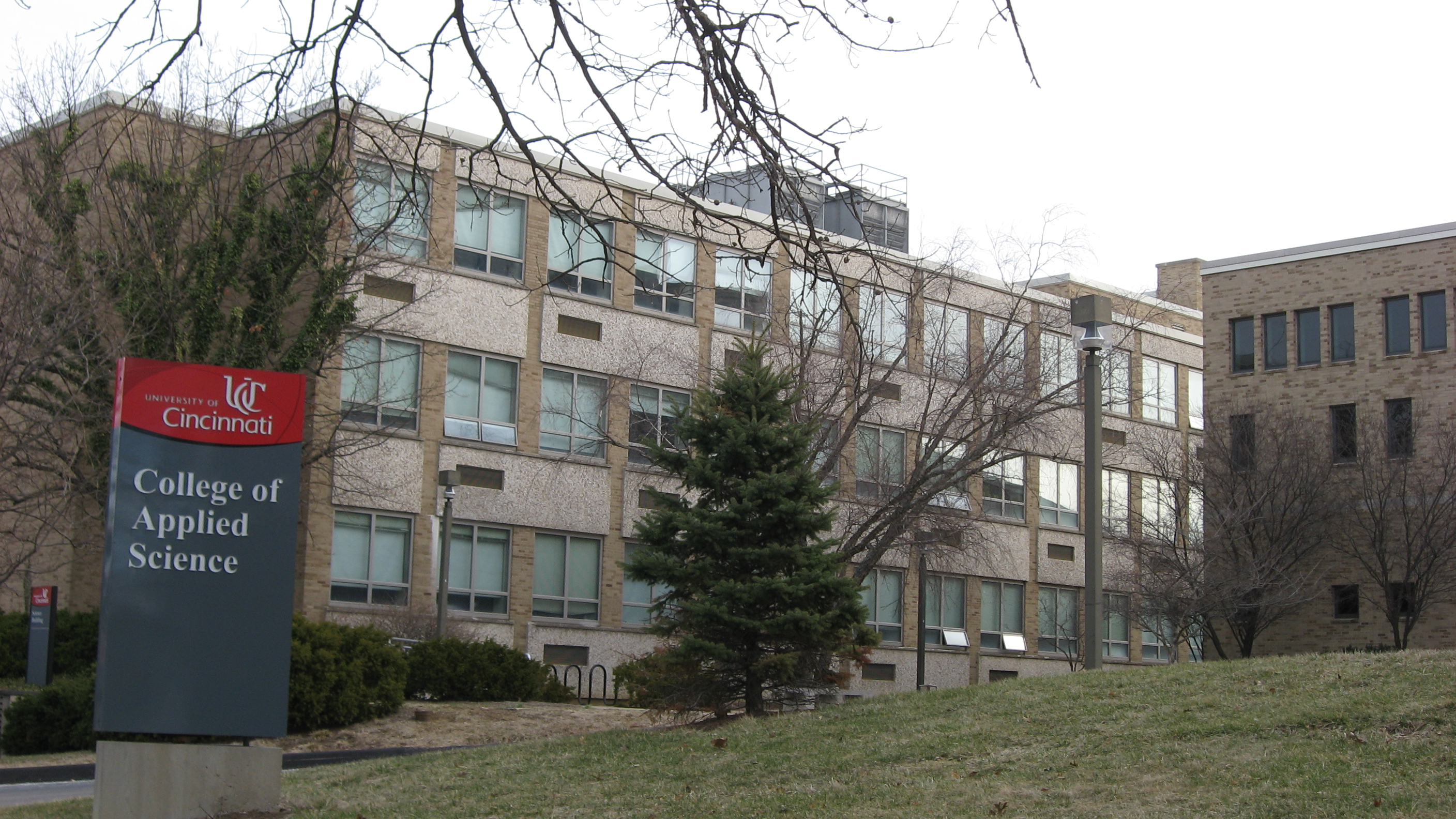
- Site of the house
- Location: Cincinnati, Ohio
- Architect: Samuel Hannaford
- Architectural style: Late Victorian
- NRHP reference No.: 80003050
- Added to NRHP: March 3, 1980

- Edgecliff Area Historic Group
- U.S. National Register of Historic Places
- U.S. Historic district
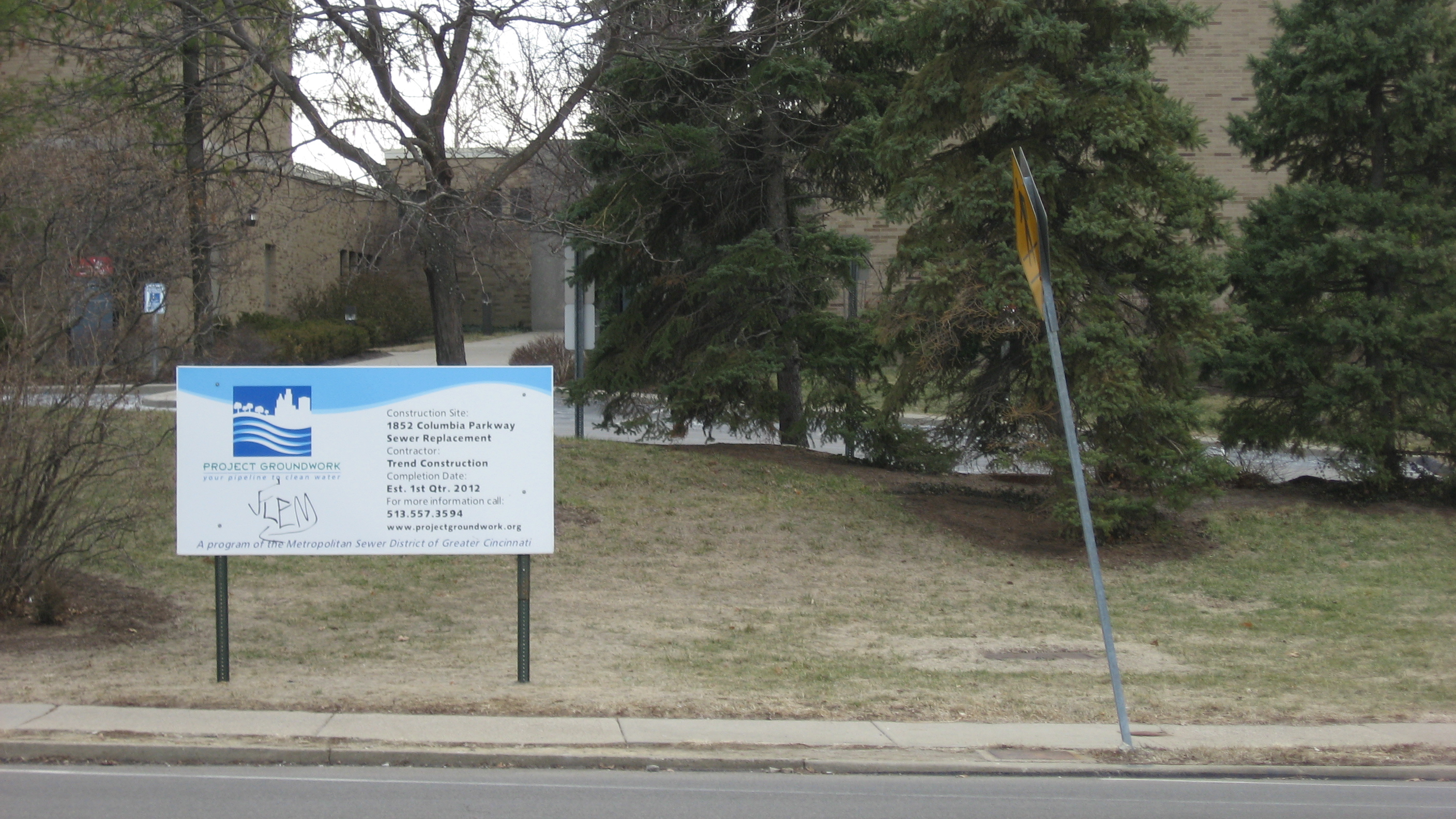
- Site of the district

- Location within Ohio Location within the United States
- Location: 2220 Victory Parkway, Cincinnati, Ohio
- Coordinates: 39°7′16″N 84°29′2″W
- Area: 30 acres (120,000 m^{2})
- Built: 1870
- Architect: Hannaford, Samuel
- Architectural style: Romanesque, Gothic Revival
- NRHP reference No.: 77001063
- Added to NRHP: November 11, 1977

Edgecliff College was a private Catholic women's college located in Cincinnati, Ohio, United States. It was founded in 1935 and merged with Xavier University, also of Cincinnati, in 1980.

== History ==
The college was founded as Our Lady of Cincinnati College by the Sisters of Mercy, a Catholic religious institute. The college was designed to serve as a replacement for the College of Sacred Heart in Clifton, which had ceased operations. The campus was located on a hill in the Walnut Hills section of the city, which offered students views of northern Kentucky and the Ohio River.

Edgecliff received its accreditation from the Higher Learning Commission in 1955. A liberal arts college, a variety of programs of study were offered, including majors in music, art, social work, and nursing. In 1969, the name was changed to Edgecliff College. A year later, the first male students were admitted, making the college fully coeducational.

In the late 1970s, Edgecliff developed an articulation agreement with the Cincinnati College of Mortuary Science, which allowed CCMS students to receive their bachelor's degree at Edgecliff after receiving their diploma and associate's degree from CCMS. By 1979, the CCMS campus had moved onto the Edgecliff campus, though the two colleges continued to operate as separate institutions.

Following financial struggles, Edgecliff officially merged with Xavier University on July 1, 1980. The final Edgecliff class graduated in 1984. All student records are now held by Xavier, and services for the more than 3,500 living alumni are organized through the university. Xavier's Alumni Hall was renamed Edgecliff Hall in honor of the college. Edgecliff Hall has since become the home of Xavier's Department of Music and Theatre.

In 1986, Xavier closed the Edgecliff campus and sold it to a private developer. The developer wanted to build two condominium towers on the cliff overlooking the Ohio River, but ultimately built only the first 23-story tower and gave the rest of the hillside to the Cincinnati Hillside Trust. The University of Cincinnati bought all of the rest of the land and the academic buildings from the developer, renovated the buildings and added an academic building, and moved its College of Applied Science to the location in 1988 from its historic home at the Emery Building (Walnut and Central Parkway).

In 1977, several of the buildings were listed on the National Register of Historic Places for their architecture, and the Edgecliff House itself was individually granted the same designation in 1980; it has since been demolished.

== See also ==
- List of current and historical women's universities and colleges in the United States
- List of university and college mergers in the United States

== Sources ==
- Fortin, Roger (2006). To See Great Wonders: A History of Xavier University 1831-2006. University of Scranton Press. ISBN 1-58966-152-4.
