= Central Nazarene College =

Junior college in Hamlin, Texas

- Former name: Central Nazarene University
- Type: Private
- Active: 1909–1929
- Affiliations: Nazarene
- President: B.F. Neeley
- Location: Hamlin, Texas, United States
- Campus: Rural

The Central Nazarene College was a junior college located in Hamlin, Texas. It closed in 1929.

== History ==
The school opened as a grammar school, academy, and junior college in 1909 under the leadership of Reverend W. E. Fisher, superintendent of the Abilene and Hamlin districts of the Church of the Nazarene to serve the Hamlin, San Antonio, and New Mexico Districts, with J.E.L. Moore as its first president. Central became the only Nazarene college in Texas when the Nazarene Bible Institute at Pilot Point, Texas was merged with it in 1911. President B.F. Neeley later agreed to a consolidation with Bethany-Peniel College at Bethany, Oklahoma in 1929.

== Campus ==
The college was located southwest of downtown Hamlin and consisted of a grey stone administration building and two wooden dormitories on a 23-acre (93,000 m^{2}) campus. Library and laboratory facilities were inadequate for standard work, however. After the college merged with the school at Bethany, the former administration building was used as a church by the local Nazarene congregation. It burned in 1934, and a new church was built to replace it in 1936.

== Academics ==
The curriculum was primarily for the education of ministers. As a "holiness" school, the charter required faculty to meet church requirements for the teaching of "sanctification."
