= Rasmussen University =

Private university in the United States

Coordinates: 44.859467°N 93.335980°W

- Motto: Doctrina Concretio Successio
- Type: Private for-profit university
- Established: 1900; 126 years ago
- Parent institution: American Public Education, Inc.
- President: Mark Arnold
- Students: 16,790
- Undergraduates: Yes
- Location: Multiple campuses, Minnesota, North Dakota, Florida, Wisconsin, Illinois and Kansas, United States
- Campus: Multiple
- Colors: Green and gold
- Mascot: "Rassy" the Moose
- Website: www.rasmussen.edu

Rasmussen University is a private for-profit university with multiple locations throughout the United States. It offers associate, bachelor's, master's, and doctoral degrees as well as certificates and diplomas in career-focused areas at 20 campuses in Minnesota, Illinois, North Dakota, Florida, Wisconsin, and Kansas with many programs offered online.

Presently, the school has more than 100,000 graduates.

== History ==
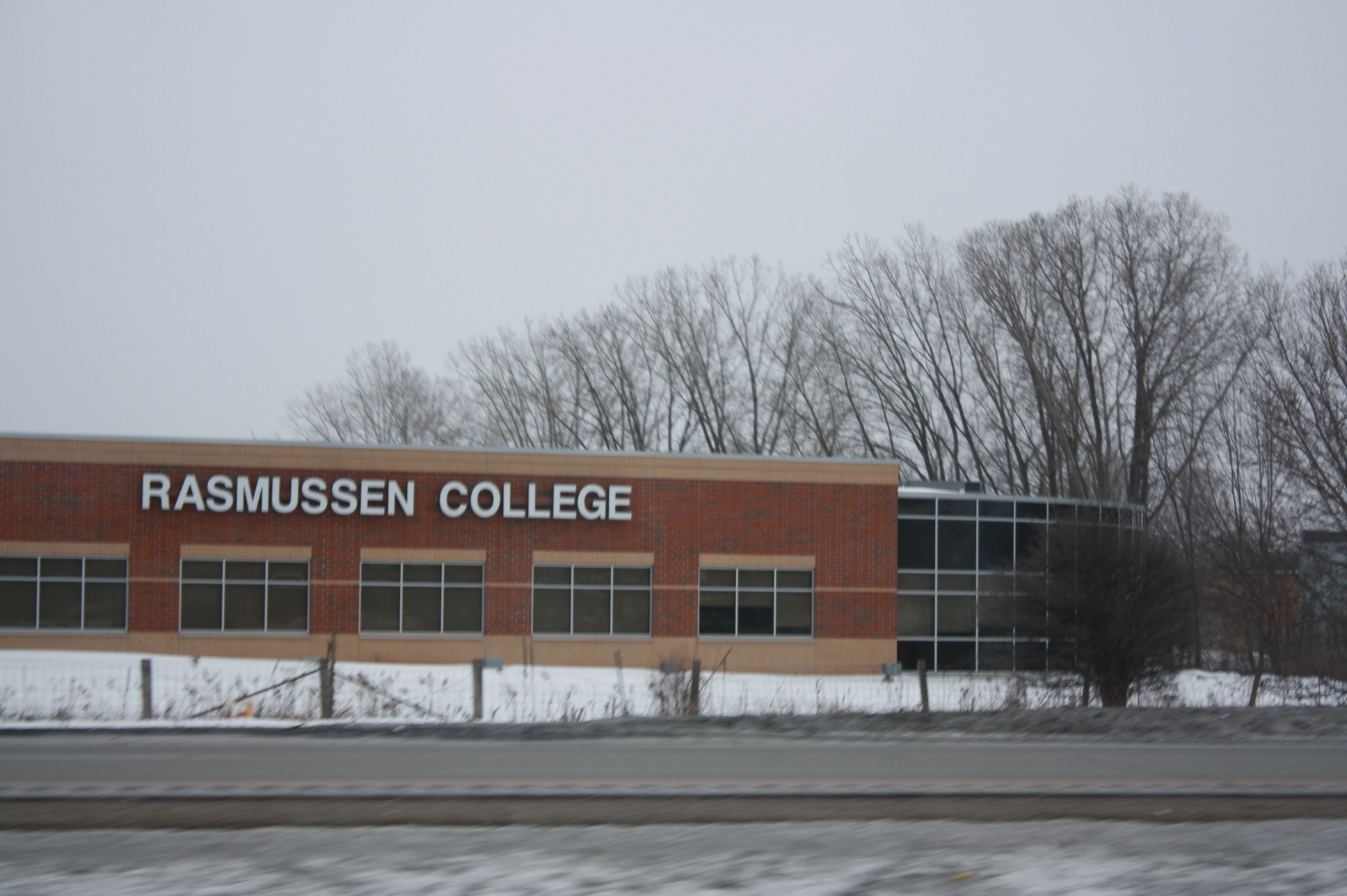
Green Bay, Wisconsin campus

Walter Rasmussen founded the school in 1900 as the Rasmussen Practical School of Business, in Stillwater, Minnesota. Rasmussen believed the need for skilled professionals by the local business community was not being met. With the advent of women's suffrage in 1921 through the Nineteenth Amendment, the school's female enrollment began to increase. In 1945 Walter Rasmussen retired and named Walter Nemitz to succeed him as director of the college. Nemitz had been with the college since 1934 and as director instituted a number of curriculum upgrades. By 1950, more than 22,400 students had graduated from the school. In 1961, Walter's sons Wilbur Nemitz and Robert Nemitz took ownership of the school.

In 1974, Rasmussen College acquired the St. Cloud Business College in St. Cloud, Minnesota and in 1979 acquired the Northern Technical School of Business.

In 1983, the school opened a campus in Mankato, Minnesota. More campuses were opened in Eagan, Minnesota (1989), St. Cloud, Minnesota (1997), Rockford, Illinois (2006), Moorhead, Minnesota, Lake Elmo, Minnesota; Eden Prairie, Minnesota; Blaine, Minnesota (2010), Topeka, Kansas (2013), Overland Park, Kansas (2013) and Green Bay, Wisconsin (2007), Mokena-Tinley Park, Illinois (2010), Wausau, Wisconsin (2010), Bloomington, Minnesota (2011) and Brooklyn Park, Minnesota (2022).

In Minnesota, the Bloomington campus replaced the Eden Prairie location, the Brooklyn Park campus replaced the Blaine location and the Lake Elmo campus was consolidated with the Eagan campus in 2022.

In 2001, Rasmussen College was accredited by the Higher Learning Commission. Rasmussen opened an online campus in 2002. The school acquired Aakers College in North Dakota and Webster College in Florida and merged the schools into Rasmussen's operations.

In 2010, Rasmussen College announced a partnership with Market Motive Inc and announced programs in Internet marketing. Rasmussen was sold to Renovus Capital in 2018.

Rasmussen College became Rasmussen University in October, 2020. That same month, American Public Education, Inc began the process of acquiring Rasmussen.

== Academics ==
The school offers 60+ programs (program availability varies by state and campus) and is organized into eight areas of study:

- Business
- Design
- Education
- Health Sciences
- Human Services
- Justice Studies
- Nursing
- Technology

Rasmussen University is accredited by the Higher Learning Commission (HLC).

== Student outcomes ==
According to a 2012 US Senate HELP investigation on for-profit colleges led by Tom Harkin, 63.2 percent of Rasmussen students withdrew, many after only five months of study.

The College Scorecard, reports that Rasmussen University has graduation rates ranging from 21 to 31 percent, typical salary after attending of $32,600 and a student loan repayment rate of 35 percent.
