= Nazarene Bible Institute =

- Type: Private
- Active: 1905–1911
- Affiliations: Church of the Nazarene
- Location: Pilot Point, Texas, United States
- Campus: Rural

Nazarene Bible Institute was a Bible college in Pilot Point, Texas, United States. It has since closed.

== History ==
The institute was established 1905 in Pilot Point by the Holiness Church of Christ. Upon its merger with the Pentecostal Church of the Nazarene in 1908, the school was named Nazarene Bible Institute and became an official institution of the Abilene District Church of the Nazarene. In 1911, it closed and merged with Central Nazarene College in Hamlin, Texas because Texas Holiness University in nearby Peniel, Texas had joined the Dallas District Church of the Nazarene.
