= Aakers Business College =

Former private college in North Dakota, US

Coordinates: 46.8483°N 96.8487°W

Aakers College logo

Aakers College was a private two-year college with campuses in Grand Forks, Fargo and Bismarck, North Dakota. In 2007, it merged with Rasmussen College and is now known as Rasmussen College. The school offers associate degrees and bachelor's degrees in several fields.

Aakers was founded in Fargo in 1902 and a second location was opened in Grand Forks, North Dakota, in 1905. The Fargo location was sold in 1912 and the Grand Forks location became the only Aakers for decades. In 1998, the Grand Forks location was closed and operations were again moved to Fargo. The Bismarck campus opened in 2003.

== Founder ==
Hans H. Aaker, proprietor of Aaker’s Business College, was born on a farm near Ridgeway, Iowa, on the 16th day of April, 1862. His father, Hans O. Aaker, was born in Sauland, Telemarken, Norway, in 1825. He emigrated to Winneshiek county, Iowa, where he was one of the early settlers and for fifty years a prominent and well to do farmer. Ragnild Aaker (née Gutehus), the mother of H. H. Aaker, was born in Hjartdal in Telemarken, Norway, and was married to Hans O. Aaker just before his emigration to this country. Young Aaker received a good primary education and entered Luther ’s College at Decorah, Iowa, where he remained nearly four years, when, coming to the conclusion that a business course would suit him better than preparation for the ministry, he entered a business college at Decorah, graduating in 1882, and from the commercial department of the Valparaiso University, Valparaiso, Ind., in 1883. Mr. Aaker then assumed charge of the commercial department of the Willmar Seminary, a new school started in 1883 at Wilmar, Minn., by Prof. A. M. Hove, later a teacher at Augsburg Seminary, Minnesota; Prof. H. S. Hilleboe, now principal of the schools at Benson, Minn., and Mr. Aaker. The seminary was one of the first schools of its kind in the Northwest, and grew in five years from twelve pupils to 250. In 1888 Mr. Aaker decided to engage in business and resigned his school position and in partnership with a brother opened a mercantile house in Twin Valley, where a profitable business was carried on. In 1891 the Northwestern Lutheran College Association was incorporated and a school styled Concordia College was started at Moorhead. The record made by Prof. Aaker at the Willmar Seminary was well known and the officers of the new school was very anxious to secure his services. Finally he was induced to accept a position with this institution. In January, 1892, he assumed charge of the commercial department and two years later he was elected principal of the school. Concordia College is one of the most prosperous schools in the Northwest.

In political matters he is known as a Prohibitionist, and he has taken an active part in the work of the party. While located at Twin Valley he was the party nominee for county superintendent of schools and lost by a narrow margin. In 1892 he was the Prohibition candidate for secretary of state. In the spring of 1900 the business men of Moorhead requested Professor Aaker to become a candidate for mayor. The city had been for many years the dumping ground of the drinking element of Fargo, N. D., a city across the state line, and under Prohibition laws. The resorts barred from Fargo found a place in Moorhead, and, as no relief could be obtained from the regular nominees, the business men decided upon Mr. Aaker, as the man to redeem the fair name of the city. He was elected by a plurality of eighty votes over the opposing candidates. In the spring of 1900, Mr. Aaker was nominated for congress by the Prohibitionists of the Seventh Congressional district. He was also a candidate for the nomination of the People’s party and had the support of the leading men of the party, but owing to saloon influence he was defeated for the nomination. Mr. Aaker, though defeated, ran ahead of his ticket, receiving more than double the votes cast for the nominee for governor. Mr. Aaker is a member of the United Norwegian Lutheran Church of America. He was married, September 5, 1900, to Miss Annette Peterson, for several years at Concordia College. He resigned his position at Concordia College, in the summer of 1902, and opened his business college in Fargo, October 27, 1902. He ran for governor on the Prohibition ticket in 1904. In 1906 he made a strong campaign against gambling and prostitution, in Fargo, as candidate for mayor on a strict enforcement platform. He is president of the Direct Legislation League, and also of the Scandinavian Republican League.
