= List of colloquial names for universities and colleges in the United States =

Because of the large number of universities and colleges in the United States, and some cases because of their lengthy formal names, it is common to abbreviate their names in everyday usage.

The type of institution, such as "University" or "College," may be dropped, or some component of it abbreviated, such as "Tech" in place of "Institute of Technology" or "Technological University."

The same nickname may apply to multiple institutions, especially in different regions. For example, "SC" is claimed by both the University of Southern California and the University of South Carolina.

The abbreviation may be non-obvious. For example, "KU" is the University of Kansas and not "UK," which is commonly the University of Kentucky. In some cases, the nickname may be better known than the formal name. For example, "West Point" for the United States Military Academy or "UCLA" for the University of California, Los Angeles.

This list of colloquial names for universities and colleges in the United States provides a lexicon of such names. It includes only alternative names for institutions, not nicknames for their campuses, athletic teams, or personalities. Thus it specifically excludes mascots and athletic team names. To see those lists, please go to:

- List of college team nicknames in the United States
- List of college mascots in the United States

== A ==
- AC
  - Augustana College (Illinois)
- ACU
  - Abilene Christian University
- AECOM
  - Albert Einstein College of Medicine
- AFA
  - United States Air Force Academy
- AFIT
  - Air Force Institute of Technology
- AIC
  - American International College
- Amherst
  - Amherst College
- Annapolis
  - U.S. Naval Academy
- A&M
  - Texas A&M University
  - Also others:see A&M
- A&M-CC or A&M-Corpus Christi
  - Texas A&M University–Corpus Christi
- ATU
  - Arkansas Tech University
- A&T
  - North Carolina A&T State University
- APSU
  - Austin Peay State University
- ALASU
  - Alabama State University
- Army
  - U.S. Military Academy
- ASU
  - Alabama State University
  - Albany State University
  - Alcorn State University
  - Angelo State University
  - Appalachian State University
  - Arizona State University
  - Arkansas State University
  - Augusta State University
- APU
  - Alaska Pacific University
- AU
  - Adelphi University
  - Alfred University
  - American University
  - Anderson University (Indiana)
  - Anderson University (South Carolina)
  - Asbury University
  - Ashland University
  - Auburn University
  - Ashford University
  - Arcadia University
  - Augusta University
  - Augustana University (South Dakota)
  - Aurora University
- AUM
  - Auburn University Montgomery
- App State
  - Appalachian State University

== B ==
- Bama
  - University of Alabama
- Bama State
  - Alabama State University
- BC
  - Babson College
  - Barnard College
  - Boston College
  - Bowdoin College
  - Bethel College
- BCC
  - Bronx Community College
- Berkeley
  - University of California, Berkeley
- BGSU
  - Bowling Green State University
- BHSU
  - Black Hills State University
- BJU
  - Bob Jones University
- BMC
  - Bryn Mawr College
- Bona
  - St. Bonaventure University
- Boulder
  - University of Colorado at Boulder
- Brown
  - Brown University
- BSC
  - Birmingham-Southern College
- BSU
  - Ball State University
  - Boise State University
  - Bemidji State University
  - Bowie State University
- BW
  - Baldwin Wallace University
- BU
  - Barry University
  - Baylor University
  - Belmont University
  - Binghamton University
  - Biola University
  - Boston University
  - Bradley University
  - Butler University
  - Bucknell University
- BYU
  - Brigham Young University

== C ==
- CBU
  - California Baptist University
- C of C
  - College of Charleston
- Cal
  - University of California, Berkeley
- Cal Poly
  - California Polytechnic State University, San Luis Obispo
- Cal Poly Pomona
  - California State Polytechnic University, Pomona
- Caltech
  - California Institute of Technology
- Cal State
  - California State University (various campuses)
- Carolina
  - University of North Carolina at Chapel Hill
  - University of South Carolina
- Catholic
  - Catholic University of America
- Central
  - Central State University
  - North Carolina Central University
- CC
  - Calvin College
  - Carleton College
  - Colorado College
- CCC
  - City Colleges of Chicago
  - Columbia College Chicago
- CCNY
  - City College of New York
- CCSU
  - Central Connecticut State University
- CCU
  - Coastal Carolina University
- CCV
  - Community College of Vermont
- CGU
  - Claremont Graduate University
- Chapel Hill
  - University of North Carolina at Chapel Hill
- Charlotte
  - University of North Carolina at Charlotte
- Chatt or Chattanooga
  - University of Tennessee at Chattanooga
- Chatt State
  - Chattanooga State Community College
- Chico State
  - California State University, Chico
- City Tech
  - New York City College of Technology
- CIA
  - The Culinary Institute of America
- CIM
  - The Cleveland Institute of Music
- CMC
  - Claremont McKenna College
- CMU
  - Carnegie Mellon University
  - Central Michigan University
- CNU
  - Christopher Newport University
- Coast Guard
  - United States Coast Guard Academy
- Coe
  - Coe College
- Colby
  - Colby College
- College Park
  - University of Maryland, College Park
- Colorado Springs
  - University of Colorado Colorado Springs
- Conn
  - Connecticut College
- COD
  - College of DuPage
- Columbia
  - Columbia College Chicago
  - Columbia University
- Cooper
  - Cooper Union
- CPP
  - California State Polytechnic University, Pomona
- CSB/SJU
  - College of Saint Benedict/Saint John's University
- CSI
  - College of Staten Island
- CSM
  - College of San Mateo
- CSU
  - California State University
  - Cleveland State University
  - Colorado State University
  - Clayton State University
  - Coppin State University
  - Clarks Summit University
  - Chicago State University
- CSUF
  - California State University, Fresno
  - California State University, Fullerton
- CSUEB
  - California State University, East Bay (formerly California State University, Hayward)
- CSULA
  - California State University, Los Angeles
- CSULB
  - California State University, Long Beach
- CSU-Pueblo
  - Colorado State University-Pueblo
- CSUS
  - California State University, Sacramento
- CU
  - Chapman University
  - Clemson University
  - Columbia University
  - University of Colorado at Boulder
  - University of Colorado system
  - Concord University
  - Cornerstone University
  - Creighton University
- CUA
  - Catholic University of America
- CUD
  - University of Colorado Denver
- Cumberlands
  - University of the Cumberlands
- CUNY
  - City University of New York
- 'Cuse
  - Syracuse University
- CWRU
  - Case Western Reserve University
- CWU
  - Central Washington University

== D ==
- DBU
  - Dallas Baptist University
- DC
  - Davidson College
- De Anza
  - De Anza College
- DPU
  - DePaul University
- DSU
  - DeSales University
  - Delta State University
  - Dakota State University
- DU
  - Denison University
  - University of Denver
  - Drake University
  - Drexel University
  - Duke University
  - Duquesne University
- Duke
  - Duke University
- DUQ
  - Duquesne University

== E ==
- ECSU
  - Elizabeth City State University
- ECU
  - East Carolina University
- EIU
  - Eastern Illinois University
- EMU
  - Eastern Mennonite University
  - Eastern Michigan University
- ENC
  - Eastern Nazarene College
- ESU
  - Emporia State University
- ETBU
  - East Texas Baptist University
- ETSU
  - East Tennessee State University
- EWU
  - Eastern Washington University
- EKU
  - Eastern Kentucky University

== F ==
- F&M
  - Franklin & Marshall College
- FAMU
  - Florida A&M University
- FAU
  - Florida Atlantic University
- FDU
  - Fairleigh Dickinson University
- FGCU
  - Florida Gulf Coast University
- FHSU
  - Fort Hays State University
- FIT
  - Fashion Institute of Technology
- FIU
  - Florida International University
- Florida Tech
  - Florida Institute of Technology
- Foothill
  - Foothill College
- FPU
  - Fresno Pacific University
- Fresno State
  - California State University, Fresno
- FSU
  - Fayetteville State University
  - Ferris State University
  - Fitchburg State University
  - Florida State University
  - Framingham State University
  - California State University, Fresno
  - Frostburg State University
- FU
  - Fairfield University
  - Fordham University
  - Friends University
  - Furman University

== G ==
- GAC
  - Gustavus Adolphus College
- GB
  - University of Wisconsin–Green Bay
- GCC
  - Grove City College
- GC&SU or GCSU
  - Georgia College & State University
- GCU
  - Grand Canyon University
- Georgia College
  - Georgia College & State University
- GMU
  - George Mason University
- Georgia Tech
  - Georgia Institute of Technology
- GGC
  - Georgia Gwinnett College
- GONZ
  - Gonzaga University
- GSU
  - Georgia Southern University
  - Georgia State University
  - Grambling State University
- GT
  - Georgia Institute of Technology
- GVSU
  - Grand Valley State University
- GW or GWU
  - Gardner-Webb University
  - George Washington University
- GU
  - Gallaudet University
  - Georgetown University
  - Gonzaga University

== H ==
- HC
  - Hamilton College
  - Haverford College
- HIU
  - Hampton University (formerly Hampton Institute)
- HMC
  - Harvey Mudd College
- Hopkins
  - Johns Hopkins University
- HU
  - Howard University
  - Hampton University
- HSC or H-SC
  - Hampden Sydney College
- HSU
  - Humboldt State University
  - Hardin-Simmons University
- HFU
  - Holy Family University

== I ==
- IC
  - Ithaca College
- IIT
  - Illinois Institute of Technology
- IPFW
  - Indiana University-Purdue University Fort Wayne
- ISU
  - Idaho State University
  - Illinois State University
  - Indiana State University
  - Iowa State University
- IU
  - Indiana University Bloomington
- IUP
  - Indiana University of Pennsylvania
- IUPUI
  - Indiana University-Purdue University Indianapolis
- IWU
  - Illinois Wesleyan University
- IW
  - Iowa Wesleyan University

== J ==
- JBU
  - John Brown University
- JCSU
  - Johnson C. Smith University
- JHU
  - Johns Hopkins University
- JMU
  - James Madison University
- JWU
  - Johnson and Wales University
- JSU
  - Jackson State University
  - Jacksonville State University (Alabama)
- JU
  - Jacksonville University
- Jax st or J'ville st
  - Jacksonville State University (Alabama)
- Jyard
  - The Juilliard School

== K ==
- Kings Point
  - United States Merchant Marine Academy
- K-State
  - Kansas State University
  - Kentucky State University
- KSU
  - Kansas State University
  - Kennesaw State University
  - Kent State University
  - Kentucky State University
- KU
  - University of Kansas
  - Kutztown University of Pennsylvania
- KYSU
  - Kentucky State University

== L ==
- LA Tech
  - Louisiana Tech University
- LC
  - Louisburg College
- LETU
  - LeTourneau University
- LHU
  - Lock Haven University
- LIU
  - Long Island University
- LMU
  - Lincoln Memorial University
  - Loyola Marymount University
- Long Beach State
  - California State University, Long Beach
- LSU
  - La Salle University
  - Louisiana State University
- LSSU
  - Lake Superior State University
- LTU
  - Lawrence Technological University
- LU
  - Liberty University
  - Lipscomb University
  - Lehigh University
- LUC
  - Loyola University Chicago

== M ==
- Madison
  - James Madison University
  - University of Wisconsin–Madison
- Mary Wash
  - University of Mary Washington
- Mason
  - George Mason University
- MCLA
  - Massachusetts College of Liberal Arts
- MCPHS
  - Massachusetts College of Pharmacy and Health Sciences
- Memphis
  - University of Memphis
- Merchant Marine, Kings Point
  - U.S. Merchant Marine Academy
- Metro State
  - Metropolitan State University of Denver
  - Metropolitan State University
- MHC or MoHo
  - Mount Holyoke College
- Midd
  - Middlebury College
- Milwaukee
  - University of Wisconsin–Milwaukee
- Missouri S&T
  - Missouri University of Science and Technology
- MIT
  - Massachusetts Institute of Technology
- Mizzou
  - University of Missouri
- MMC
  - Marymount Manhattan College
- Mt. SAC
  - Mt. San Antonio College
- MSU
  - Michigan State University
  - Mississippi State University
  - Missouri State University
  - Morehead State University
  - Murray State University
  - Montana State University System
  - Montana State University
  - Montclair State University
  - Mountain State University
  - Morgan State University
  - Minnesota State University-Mankato
- MSUM
  - Minnesota State University-Moorhead
- MTSU
  - Middle Tennessee State University
- MTU
  - Michigan Technological University
- MU
  - Marquette University
  - Miami University (Ohio)
  - Marymount University
  - University of Missouri
  - Misericordia University
  - Millersville University
  - Mercyhurst University
- Mudd
  - Harvey Mudd College
- MVille
  - Manhattanville University
- MVSU
  - Mississippi Valley State University
- MUW
  - Mississippi University for Women
- MXU
  - Malcolm X College

== N ==
- Navy
  - United States Naval Academy
- NAU
  - Northern Arizona University
  - National American University
- NCCU
  - North Carolina Central University
- NCSU
  - North Carolina State University
- NC A&T
  - North Carolina A&T State University
- ND
  - University of North Dakota
  - University of Notre Dame
- NDSU
  - North Dakota State University
- NEU
  - Northeastern University
- NEC
  - New England Conservatory of Music
- NCB
  - New College Berkeley
- NCF
  - New College of Florida
- Newport News
  - Apprentice School
- NIU
  - Northern Illinois University
- NJIT
  - New Jersey Institute of Technology
- NKU
  - Northern Kentucky University
- NMSU
  - New Mexico State University
- NMT
  - New Mexico Institute of Mining and Technology
- NMU
  - Northern Michigan University
- NoDak
  - University of North Dakota
- Nova
  - Northern Virginia Community College
  - Villanova University
- NSU
  - Norfolk State University
  - Northern State University (South Dakota)
  - Northeastern State University (Oklahoma)
  - Northwestern State University (Louisiana)
  - Nova Southeastern University
- NU
  - Northeastern University
  - University of Nebraska–Lincoln
  - Niagara University
  - Northwestern University
  - Norwich University
- NVU
  - Northern Vermont University
- NWMSU
  - Northwest Missouri State University
- NYIT
  - New York Institute of Technology (aka New York Tech)
- NYMC
  - New York Medical College
- NYU
  - New York University

== O ==
- OC
  - Oklahoma Christian University
- OBU
  - Oklahoma Baptist University
- OCC
  - Orange Coast College
- OCU
  - Oklahoma City University
- ODU
  - Ohio Dominican University
  - Old Dominion University
- OIT
  - Oregon Institute of Technology
- OK State
  - Oklahoma State University
- Ole Miss
  - University of Mississippi
- OLLU
  - Our Lady of the Lake University
- ONU
  - Ohio Northern University
- ORU
  - Oral Roberts University
- OSU
  - Ohio State University
  - Oklahoma State University
  - Oregon State University
- OU
  - Oakland University (Michigan)
  - Ohio University
  - University of Oklahoma
  - Oakwood University
- Oxy
  - Occidental College

== P ==
- Pacific
  - University of the Pacific (United States)
- PC
  - Presbyterian College
  - Providence College
- PCC
  - Pasadena City College
  - Pensacola Christian College
  - Pima Community College
  - Polk Community College
  - Portland Community College
  - Pueblo Community College
- Penn
  - University of Pennsylvania
- Penn State
  - Pennsylvania State University
- PennWest
  - Pennsylvania Western University
- Pitt
  - University of Pittsburgh
- Platt or Platteville
  - University of Wisconsin-Platteville
- PLNU
  - Point Loma Nazarene University
- POM
  - Pomona College
- PSU
  - Pennsylvania State University
  - Pittsburg State University (Kansas)
  - Portland State University
  - Plymouth State University
- PTS
  - Princeton Theological Seminary
- PVAMU
  - Prairie View A&M University

== Q ==
- QC
  - Queens College, City University of New York (aka Queens College)
  - Quincy College
- QU
  - Quincy University
  - Quinnipiac University

== R ==
- RC
  - Randolph College
- RCAD
  - Ringling College of Art and Design
- RHIT
  - Rose-Hulman Institute of Technology
- RIC
  - Rhode Island College
- RISD
  - Rhode Island School of Design
- RIT
  - Rochester Institute of Technology
- RMU
  - Robert Morris University
- R-MWC
  - Randolph-Macon Woman's College (now Randolph College)
- RPI
  - Rensselaer Polytechnic Institute
- RU
  - Radford University
  - Regis University
  - Roosevelt University
  - Rutgers University
- RUC
  - Radford University Carilion
- RWU
  - Roger Williams University

== S ==
- Sacramento State / Sac State
  - California State University, Sacramento
- SBCC
  - Santa Barbara City College
- SBU
  - St. Bonaventure University
- SC
  - University of Southern California
  - University of South Carolina
- SCSU
  - South Carolina State University
  - Southern Connecticut State University
  - Saint Cloud State University
- Scripps
  - Scripps College
  - Scripps Institution of Oceanography
- SCU
  - Santa Clara University
- SDSM&T
  - South Dakota School of Mines and Technology
- SDSU
  - South Dakota State University
  - San Diego State University
- SeattleU
  - Seattle University
- SEMo
  - Southeast Missouri State University
- SEU
  - Saint Elizabeth University
- Sewanee:
  - Sewanee: The University of the South (aka University of the South)
- SFA or SFASU
  - Stephen F. Austin State University
- SFSU
  - San Francisco State University
- SHC
  - Spring Hill College
- SIU or SIUC
  - Southern Illinois University Carbondale
- SIUE
  - Southern Illinois University Edwardsville
- SJC
  - St. John's College (Annapolis/Santa Fe)
- SJFU
  - St. John Fisher University
- SJSU
  - San Jose State University
- SJU
  - Saint Joseph's University
  - St. John's University (New York)
- SLU
  - Saint Louis University
  - St. Lawrence University
  - Saint Leo University
- SMC
  - Saint Mary's College of California
- SMU
  - Southern Methodist University
- SNHU
  - Southern New Hampshire University
- SOSU
  - Southeastern Oklahoma State University
- SPU
  - Seattle Pacific University
- SRU
  - Slippery Rock University of Pennsylvania
- Stanislaus State or Stan State
  - California State University, Stanislaus
- SSU
  - Savannah State University
  - California State University, Sonoma
- State
  - any of various state universities
- Stout
  - University of Wisconsin-Stout
- SU
  - Southwestern University
  - Shenandoah University
  - Southern University
  - Susquehanna University
  - Syracuse University
  - Salisbury University
  - Samford University
  - Schreiner University
- SUNO
  - Southern University at New Orleans
- SUU
  - Southern Utah University
- SUNY
  - State University of New York system
- SVSU
  - Saginaw Valley State University
- Swat
  - Swarthmore College
- SWOSU
  - Southwestern Oklahoma State University
- SXU
  - Saint Xavier University

== T ==
- TAMU
  - Texas A&M University
- TAMUCC
  - Texas A&M University–Corpus Christi
- TCNJ
  - The College of New Jersey
- TC
  - Texarkana College
  - Trinity College (Connecticut)
- TCU
  - Texas Christian University
- Tech
  - any various "Institute of Technology," "Tech University," "Polytechnic," etc.
    See:
    List of institutions using the term "institute of technology" or "polytechnic"
- Texas
  - University of Texas at Austin
- TIU
  - Trinity International University
- Transy
  - Transylvania University
- TSU
  - Tarleton State University
  - Tennessee State University
  - Texas Southern University
  - Truman State University
- TTU
  - Texas Tech University
  - Tennessee Technological University
- TU
  - Taylor University
  - Temple University
  - Towson University
  - Trinity University
  - Tufts University
  - Tulane University
  - Tuskegee University
  - University of Tulsa
- TxSt
  - Texas State University–San Marcos

== U ==
- The U
  - University of Miami
  - University of Minnesota
  - University of Utah
- U of A
  - University of Arizona
  - University of Arkansas
- U of U
  - University of Utah
- UA
  - University of Akron
  - University of Alabama
  - University of Arizona
- UAA
  - University of Alaska Anchorage
- UAB
  - University of Alabama at Birmingham
- UAF
  - University of Alaska Fairbanks
- UAH
  - University of Alabama in Huntsville
- UALR
  - University of Arkansas at Little Rock
- UAM
  - University of Arkansas at Monticello
- UAPB
  - University of Arkansas at Pine Bluff
- UB
  - University of Baltimore
  - University at Buffalo
  - University of Bridgeport
- U of C
  - University of Chicago
- UC
  - University of California system
  - University of Chicago
  - University of Cincinnati
  - University of the Cumberlands
- UC Berkeley
  - University of California, Berkeley
- UC Davis
  - University of California, Davis
- UC Irvine
  - University of California, Irvine
- UCA
  - University of Central Arkansas
- UCCS
  - University of Colorado Colorado Springs
- UCD
  - University of California, Davis
- UCF
  - University of Central Florida (formerly Florida Tech)
- UChicago
  - University of Chicago
- UCI
  - University of California, Irvine
- UCLA
  - University of California, Los Angeles
- UCM
  - University of Central Missouri
- UCO
  - University of Central Oklahoma
- UConn
  - University of Connecticut
- UCR
  - University of California, Riverside
- UCSB
  - University of California, Santa Barbara
- UCSD
  - University of California, San Diego
- UCSF
  - University of California, San Francisco
- UD
  - University of Dallas
  - University of Dayton
  - University of Delaware
- UDM
  - University of Detroit Mercy
- UDC
  - University of the District of Columbia
- U Dub
  - University of Washington
- UF
  - University of Florida
- UGA
  - University of Georgia
- UH
  - University of Hawaiʻi at Mānoa
  - University of Hawaii system
  - University of Houston
- U of H
  - University of Houston
- UHCL
  - University of Houston–Clear Lake
- UHD
  - University of Houston–Downtown
- UHS
  - University of Houston System
- UHV
  - University of Houston–Victoria (now Texas A&M University–Victoria)
- UI or U of I
  - University of Idaho
  - University of Illinois at Urbana–Champaign
  - University of Iowa
- UIC
  - University of Illinois at Chicago
- UIS
  - University of Illinois at Springfield
- UIUC
  - University of Illinois at Urbana–Champaign
- UIW
  - University of the Incarnate Word
- UK
  - University of Kentucky
- ULM
  - University of Louisiana at Monroe
- UL
  - University of Louisiana at Lafayette
- U of L
  - University of Louisville
- UM
  - University of Miami
- U of M
  - University of Memphis
  - University of Michigan
  - University of Minnesota
  - University of Montana
- UMass
  - University of Massachusetts Amherst
- UMB
  - University of Maryland, Baltimore
  - University of Massachusetts Boston
- UMBC
  - University of Maryland, Baltimore County
- UMD
  - University of Maryland, College Park
  - University of Massachusetts Dartmouth
  - University of Michigan–Dearborn
  - University of Minnesota Duluth
- UMDNJ
  - University of Medicine and Dentistry of New Jersey
- UMGC
  - University of Maryland Global Campus
- UMich
  - University of Michigan
- UMKC
  - University of Missouri–Kansas City
- UML
  - University of Massachusetts Lowell
- UMO
  - University of Maine at Orono
- UMW
  - University of Mary Washington
- UNA
  - University of North Alabama
- UNC
  - University of North Carolina at Chapel Hill
  - University of Northern Colorado
- UNCC
  - University of North Carolina at Charlotte
- UNCG
  - University of North Carolina at Greensboro
- UNCW
  - University of North Carolina at Wilmington
- UND
  - University of North Dakota
- UNF
  - University of North Florida
- UNH
  - University of New Hampshire
  - University of New Haven
- UNI
  - University of Northern Iowa (formerly Iowa Teachers)
- Union
  - Union College
- UNK
  - University of Nebraska at Kearney
- UNL
  - University of Nebraska–Lincoln
- UNLV
  - University of Nevada, Las Vegas (formerly Nevada Southern)
- UNM
  - University of New Mexico
- UNO
  - University of Nebraska at Omaha
  - University of New Orleans (now LSU New Orleans)
- UNR
  - University of Nevada, Reno
- UNT
  - University of North Texas
- UO
  - University of Oregon
- UOP
  - University of the Pacific (United States)
- UoPeople
  - University of the People
- UP
  - University of Portland
- UPB
  - University of Pittsburgh at Bradford
- UPenn
  - University of Pennsylvania
- UPG
  - University of Pittsburgh at Greensburg
- UPIKE
  - University of Pikeville
- UPJ
  - University of Pittsburgh at Johnstown
- UPT
  - University of Pittsburgh at Titusville
- UR or U of R
  - University of Richmond
  - University of Rochester
- URI
  - University of Rhode Island
- U of S
  - University of Scranton
- USA
  - University of South Alabama
- USAFA
  - United States Air Force Academy
- USAO
  - University of Science and Arts of Oklahoma
- USC
  - University of Southern California
  - University of South Carolina
- USCA
  - University of South Carolina Aiken
- USD
  - University of San Diego
  - University of South Dakota
- USF
  - University of San Francisco
  - University of South Florida
- USFCA
  - University of San Francisco
- USI
  - University of Southern Indiana
- USM
  - University of Southern Maine
  - The University of Southern Mississippi
- USU
  - Utah State University
- UT
  - University of Tampa
  - University of Tennessee
  - University of Texas at Austin
  - University of Toledo
- UTA
  - University of Texas at Arlington
- UTB
  - University of Texas at Brownsville
- UTC
  - University of Tennessee at Chattanooga
- UTD
  - University of Texas at Dallas
- UTEP
  - University of Texas at El Paso (formerly Texas Western)
- UTHSCT
  - University of Texas Health Science Center at Tyler
- UTM
  - University of Tennessee at Martin
- UTPB
  - University of Texas Permian Basin
- UTRGV
  - University of Texas Rio Grande Valley
- UTSA
  - University of Texas at San Antonio
- U of U
  - University of Utah
- UVA
  - University of Virginia
- UVM
  - University of Vermont
- UVU
  - Utah Valley University
- UW
  - University of Washington
  - University of Wisconsin System
  - University of Wisconsin–Madison
  - University of Wyoming
- UWA
  - University of West Alabama
- UWEC
  - University of Wisconsin-Eau Claire
- UWF
  - University of West Florida
- UWG
  - University of West Georgia
- UWGB or UWGBY
  - University of Wisconsin–Green Bay
- UWL or UWLC or UWLAC or UWLAX
  - University of Wisconsin–La Crosse
- UWM
  - University of Wisconsin–Milwaukee
- UWO
  - University of Wisconsin-Oshkosh
- UWP
  - University of Wisconsin-Parkside
  - University of Wisconsin-Platteville
- UWRF
  - University of Wisconsin-River Falls
- UWS
  - University of Western States
  - University of Wisconsin-Superior
- UWSP
  - University of Wisconsin-Stevens Point
- UWW
  - University of Wisconsin-Whitewater

== V ==
- Valpo
  - Valparaiso University
- Vandy
  - Vanderbilt University
- VC
  - Vassar College
- VCU
  - Virginia Commonwealth University
- Virginia Tech
  - Virginia Polytechnic Institute and State University
- VMI
  - Virginia Military Institute
- VPI
  - Virginia Polytechnic Institute and State University (An abbreviation of the university official name, though not actively used by the university)
- VSU
  - Valdosta State University
  - Virginia State University
- VT
  - Virginia Polytechnic Institute and State University
- VTC
  - Vermont Technical College
- VTSU
  - Vermont State University
- VU
  - Valparaiso University
  - Vanderbilt University
  - Villanova University
  - Vincennes University
  - Vanguard University
- VUU
  - Virginia Union University

== W ==
- WCU
  - Western Colorado University
- W&J
  - Washington & Jefferson College
- W&L
  - Washington and Lee University
- W&M
  - The College of William & Mary
- WashU or Wash U
  - Washington University in St. Louis
- Wazzu
  - Washington State University
- WC
  - Wagner College
  - Wellesley College
  - Wilmington College
- WCU
  - Western Carolina University
  - West Chester University
- West Point
  - United States Military Academy (aka Army)
- Western
  - Western Washington University
- WFU
  - Wake Forest University
- WGU
  - Western Governors University
- Williams
  - Williams College
- WIU
  - Western Illinois University
- WKU
  - Western Kentucky University
- WMU
  - Western Michigan University
- WPI
  - Worcester Polytechnic Institute
- WSU
  - Washington State University
  - Wichita State University
  - Wright State University
- WSSU
  - Winston-Salem State University
- WTAMU
  - West Texas A&M University
- WU
  - Washburn University
  - Washington University in St. Louis
  - Winthrop University
- WUSTL
  - Washington University in St. Louis
- WVU
  - West Virginia University
- WVUP
  - West Virginia University at Parkersburg
- WWC
  - Warren Wilson College
- WWU
  - Western Washington University

== X ==
- XU
  - Xavier University (Cincinnati)
- XULA
  - Xavier University of Louisiana

== Y ==
- The Y
  - Brigham Young University
- YSU
  - Youngstown State University
- YU
  - Yeshiva University

== See also ==
- List of NCAA Division I institutions
- List of NCAA Division II institutions
- List of NCAA Division III institutions
- List of NAIA institutions
- List of NJCAA Division I schools
- List of NJCAA Division II schools
- List of NJCAA Division III schools
- List of USCAA institutions
- List of NCCAA institutions
