= Crown College (Tacoma) =

- Type: For profit
- Executive Director: John Wabel
- Students: (closed)
- Location: Tacoma, Washington, United States
- Website: www.crowncollege.edu

Crown College was a small, for-profit, predominantly online college located in Tacoma, Washington. Crown College lost its educational accreditation on July 31, 2007, and it suspended operations on August 10, 2007.

== History ==
The institution was originally Crown School of Hair Design in Everett, Washington and was not affiliated with its present ownership. Killebrew/Dalton, Inc. purchased the school on January 5, 1990 and changed the name of the school to Crown Academy. Crown Academy kept its National Association of Trade and Technical Schools (NATTS) accreditation and continued to be licensed by the Washington State Workforce Training and Education Coordinating Board. In six months, after the last of the beauty school students left, Crown Academy began a correctional officers training program and moved to Tacoma in 1991. The school's name was changed to Crown College in 1994 and it began offering associate of science degrees in criminal justice. One year later it added a court operations specialist program which evolved into paralegal studies. A few years later Crown offered a bachelor and associate degree in public administration. In 2003, John Wabel became the sole shareholder of Killebrew/Dalton, Inc. and, soon after, Crown College began offering an associate degree and bachelor's degree in business administration.

Crown College offered most of its classes through distance education. It employs an online technology called the Cloudroom which is a "live interactive classroom environment". It also features an accelerated program where students can complete an Associate of Science in approximately 14 months and a Bachelor of Science in approximately 28 months.

== Accreditation ==
Until July 31, 2007, Crown College was accredited by the Accrediting Commission of Career Schools and Colleges of Technology (ACCSCT), which superseded the NATTS in 1993. Crown College had been on probation with ACCSCT intermittently since 2005. The ACCSCT is a national accrediting agency which accredits 800 post-secondary schools and colleges serving over 240,000 students. These schools teach a wide range of vocational, career and technical subjects which include massage, acupuncture, beauty, pet grooming, cooking, art, locksmithing, gemology, detective investigation, refrigeration, helicopter flight training, mechanical and aviation maintenance to name a few.

== Closure ==
On July 31, 2007, the ACCSCT stripped the school of its accreditation, resulting in the school having to close, until such time it can regain accreditation. According to the associate director of the ACCSCT, Crown was stripped of its accreditation because it failed to place 70% of its graduates in the field they had studied for. Arrangements were made for current students to complete their studies through Herzing College Online. In order to offer degrees in Washington State again, Crown will need to seek approval from the Higher Education Coordinating Board since the loss of ACCSCT accreditation means Crown would no longer be exempt from HECB oversight.

== Federal criminal indictment ==
On August 14, 2007, the Department of Education, Office of Inspector General, served a search warrant on Crown College and seized documents and computer files connected with an alleged case of financial aid fraud, conspiracy to defraud and bank fraud by senior employees of Crown College. These employees and some of their "significant" others, were under the impression that Crown College would close and allegedly falsified loan applications and received financial aid though they did not attend Crown. They allegedly figured that the loans would be discharged when the school closed. However, when the school did not close immediately, they allegedly falsified attendance records commensurate with the loans.

On May 13, 2010, four former officers of the defunct school were indicted by a federal grand jury on charges of mail and financial aid fraud. The charges stem from the August 14, 2007 investigation. The indictment named four former officers of the school: Sheila Mullineaux, Vice President; Jesica McMullin, Admissions Director and Registrar; Misty Lee, Financial Aid Director; and Jennifer Byers, Fiscal Manager and Bookkeeper.

On July 14, 2011, Jesica McMullin and Jennifer Byers were each found guilty of 7 counts of mail fraud and 1 count of financial aid fraud. Misty Lee plead guilty to similar charges, testifying to the others' involvement in the fraud. McMullin and Byers are scheduled to be sentenced in October 2011.

== Degrees offered ==
Crown College offered Associate of Science degrees in Paralegal Studies, Criminal Justice and Business Administration and Bachelor of Science degrees in Business and Public Administration. These degrees were conveyed under the authority and auspices of the ACCSCT since Crown College is exempt from oversight by the Washington State Higher Education Coordinating Board (HECB). which oversees most degree granting colleges and universities in the state. However, since the ACCSCT no longer accredits Crown College, it is no longer authorized to offer degrees in Washington state.

== Lawsuits ==
Crown College's degrees and credits, like those of many for profit schools accredited by national accreditors, are presently not accepted for transfer or recognized by many institutions that have regional accreditation. In 2000, 2004 and again in 2005, Crown College was sued, not because their credits do not transfer, but because they allegedly misrepresented that fact to prospective students. Other nationally accredited schools, notably Florida Metropolitan University, have been accused of making similar misrepresentations. Eleven students participated in the three lawsuits; all alleged that Crown College's admission representatives and staff misrepresented the transferability of their credits to regionally accredited schools such as Gonzaga University, University of Washington, and Seattle University. Each of these students claimed that their decision to attend Crown College was based on these alleged misrepresentations and that Crown College staff made them with the intent of inducing the students to enroll. Lola Jackson and three former students sued Crown College in 2000. Crown College settled that case for a confidential sum before trial in 2004.

In 2004 Crown College was sued by Latisha Gonzalez and then in early 2005 by Joanne Black (a class action lawsuit that was never certified) and five other plaintiffs. The Black lawsuit also alleged that Crown College's sound system, faculty and curriculum was deficient and that their placement claims were inflated. In the Gonzalez and Black cases Executive Director John Wabel claimed that Crown College's enrollment agreement and catalog clearly stated that they could not assure the transferability of their credits and claimed that no admissions representative made such an assurance. These two lawsuits were widely reported in the local and national news. In January 2006, the Gonzalez case was tried and ten former students, from 1998 to the present, came forward to testify that Crown College admissions representatives had also misrepresented the transferability of credits to them. After a seven-day trial, the jury found that Crown College had violated the Washington State Consumer Protection Act which outlaws deceptive practices in business. The judge later assessed a total of $77,000 including attorney fees and punitive damages per the statute and she issued an injunction mandating that Crown College have each student sign a form with specific language concerning the transferability of their credits and also include in all their advertising that they were accredited by the ACCSCT. The injunction was later lifted. In August 2006, Crown College settled the Black case for $87,000, divided amongst the six plaintiffs, without admitting liability. Crown's enrollment agreements now require that prospective students waive their right to sue the school if their credits are not accepted for transfer by other schools.
