= List of college nickname changes in the United States =

In the United States, most universities and colleges that sponsor athletics programs have adopted an official nickname for its associated teams. Often, these nicknames have changed for any number of reasons, which might include a change in the name of the school itself, a term becoming dated or otherwise changing meaning, or changes in racial perceptions and sensitivities. In the case of the latter, many schools have recently deprecated nicknames that some might consider offensive to American Indians, a group that has been a traditional inspiration for athletic teams.

== Changes ==
- Adams State Grizzlies, adopted in the spring of 1996; known the "Indians" from the mid-1920s until November 1995
- Akron Zips, called the "Zippers" from 1927 to 1950; this was changed when the term became most associated with the type of clothing fastener.
- Alabama–Huntsville Chargers, changed from "Uhlan Chargers" to "Chargers" over time
- Alaska Nanooks, changed from the "Polar Bears" to "Nanooks" (the Inupiaq word for polar bear) in 1963.
- Alvernia Golden Wolves, changed from "Crusaders" ahead of the 2017–18 season
- Amherst Mammoths, adopted in 2017 after "Lord Jeffs" was dropped in 2016
- Arizona State Sun Devils, formerly the "Owls", then the "Bulldogs" from 1922 to 1946
- Arkansas Razorbacks, changed from the "Cardinals" in 1909.
- Arkansas State Red Wolves, formerly the "Indians" (1931–2008), "Warriors" (1930–1931), "Gorillas" (1925–1930), and "Aggies" (1911–1925).
- Arkansas Tech Wonder Boys — Originally nicknamed "Aggies"; the term "Wonder Boys" was first attached to the school's football team in an Arkansas Gazette story on November 17, 1920, and was soon officially adopted. The women's nickname of "Golden Suns" was adopted once Tech added women's sports.
- Army Black Knights, the current nickname was derived from newspapers calling the team the "Black Knights of the Hudson" in the 1930s. It was changed from the "Cadets" in 1999. Cadets is still considered an acceptable use, however.
- Auburn–Montgomery Warhawks — Changed from "Senators" in 2011.
- Ball State Cardinals, changed from the "Hoosieroons" in 1929.
- Baruch Bearcats, changed from the "Statesmen" in 2002.
- Belmont Bruins, changed from "Rebels" in 1995
- Beloit Buccaneers, adopted in 1949; formerly the "Gold" from 1889 and then the "Blue Devils" from the mid-1920s
- Bethel Threshers, changed from "Graymaroons" in 1960
- Binghamton Bearcats, changed from "Colonials" in 1999.
- Bloomsburg Huskies, adopted "Huskies" in 1933; previously known as the "Maroon and Gold"
- Bowling Green Falcons, changed from the "Normals" in 1927.
- Bradley Braves, changed from "Indians" in the 1930s
- Brewton–Parker Barons, formerly the "Wildcats"
- Brooklyn Bulldogs, known as the "Kingsmen" from 1932 to 1994 and then the "Bridges" until 2010
- Brown Bears, Senator Theodore F. Green suggested the nickname "Bears" in 1904, but the unofficial nickname "Bruins" became more prevalent starting in the 1930s. It was formerly used interchangeably with the official nickname, although some media disused "Bruins" after a minor league hockey team, the Providence Bruins, was established nearby in 1992.
- Buffalo Bulls, formerly known as the "Bisons" (1915–1930), changed to distinguish from the city of Buffalo's identically named professional teams.
- Butler Bulldogs — First known as "Christians", alluding to the school's original name of North Western Christian University (though it had become Butler University in 1877, before the school had an athletic program). The "Bulldogs" nickname was first used in 1919 by a cartoonist for Butler's student newspaper, and was soon officially adopted.
- Cal State Los Angeles Golden Eagles, changed from "Diablos" in January 1981
- Campbell Fighting Camels — Officially adopted near the start of 1934; originated from a misunderstood conversation early in the 20th century between university founder James Archibald Campbell and a visitor trying to encourage him after a fire destroyed almost all of the school's original buildings. Before the official adoption of "Camels" (with "Fighting" added later), "Hornets", "Campbells", and "Campbellites" were variously used.
- Capital Comets, changed from the "Crusaders" in 2021; formerly the "Fighting Lutherans"
- Carthage Firebirds — Known as "Redmen" before 2005; changed to "Red Men" and "Lady Reds" due to the NCAA's ruling on Native American-related nicknames. These nicknames were retired after the 2019–20 school year; the current nickname of "Firebirds" was adopted for all teams in February 2021.
- Case Western Reserve Spartans, formed from the combination of Western Reserve and Case Institute of Technology. Western Reserve's nicknames were the Pioneers (1921–1927) and Red Cats (1928–1971). Case Institute of Technology's nicknames were the Scientists (1918–1938) and Rough Riders (1930–1971). In the 1930s, both of those names were used.
- Central Michigan Chippewas, formerly the "Bearcats" (1927–1942), "Dragons" (1925–1927), and the "Normalites" (until 1925). The current name was chosen in honor of the local Saginaw tribe, and has remained in use with the tribe's consent.
- Chowan Hawks, reverted from "Braves" in 2006
- Coe Kohawks, adopted in 1922; previously known as the "Crimson" and the "Warriors"
- Colgate Raiders, changed from "Red Raiders" in 2001
- Colorado Buffaloes, changed from the "Silver and Gold" in 1934. They had also been known informally as the "Arapahoes", "Big Horns", "Frontiersmen", "Grizzlies", "Hornets", "Yellow Jackets", and (the football team) "Silver Helmets".
- CSU–Pueblo ThunderWolves, changed from the "Indians" in 1995. The school name was changed from University of Southern Colorado in 2003.
- Cumberland Phoenix, changed from Bulldogs in 2016
- Cumberlands Patriots, changed from the Cumberland "Indians" (note the singular "Cumberland") in 2002, when the school was known as Cumberland College. The school adopted its current name of the University of the Cumberlands in 2005.
- Dartmouth Big Green, formerly "Indians" which was disused since the 1970s in favor of an existing nickname, "Big Green".
- Davis & Elkins Senators, formerly the "Scarlet Hurricane"
- Detroit Mercy Titans, originally the "Tigers"; changed in 1919 or 1924, depending on the source. The school was then known as the University of Detroit, and the change was presumably made to avoid confusion with Major League Baseball's Detroit Tigers. While the school became the University of Detroit Mercy after a 1990 merger, the "Mercy" name was not added to the athletic branding until 2017.
- Dickinson Red Devils, adopted the "Red Devils" nickname in 1930 after they were dubbed such by a writer from the Public Ledger; Dickinson was previously known as the "Red and White".
- Dickinson State Blue Hawks, changed from "Savages" in 1972
- D'Youville Saints, changed from "Spartans" in 2020
- East Carolina Pirates, changed from the "Teachers" in 1934.
- Eastern Michigan Eagles, changed from the "Hurons" (1929–1991) due to pressure from the Michigan Department of Civil Rights; the teams had previously been known as the "Normalites" and the "Men from Ypsi".
- Eastern Nazarene Lions, changed from the "Crusaders" in 2009
- Eastern Washington Eagles, changed from "Savages" in 1973
- Elizabeth City State Vikings, changed from "Pirates" in 1963
- Elon Phoenix, formerly the "Fighting Christians" until 2000
- Emory and Henry Wasps, adopted in 1921, formerly "Wildcats", "Jackrabbits", and "Whitetoppers"
- Evangel Valor, changed from "Crusaders" in 2021
- FIU Panthers, changed from "Sunblazers" to "Golden Panthers" in 1987 and "Panthers" in 2010.
- Furman Paladins, football team changed from "Hurricane" in 1961, baseball team changed from "Hornets" in 1961, basketball team has been "Paladins" all along.
- George Washington Revolutionaries, changed from "Hatchetites" in 1928 and from "Colonials" in 2023
- Georgia Southern Eagles, formerly the Blue Tide (1924–1941) and Professors (1941–1959)
- Georgia Tech Yellow Jackets, "Yellowjackets" (as one word) first came into use after it appeared in the Atlanta Constitution in 1905; other nicknames included "Techs" (discontinued c. 1910), "Engineers", "Blacksmiths" (1902–1904), and "Golden Tornado" (1917–1929)
- Hampton Pirates and Lady Pirates, known as the "Seasiders" from 1916 to 1932
- Hanover Panthers, formerly the "Hilltoppers"
- Hawaii Rainbow Warriors and Rainbow Wahine, known as "Fighting Deans" before 1923; the school's nickname was "Rainbows" from 1923 through 2000, when the university allowed all of its athletic teams to adopt their own individual nicknames: the baseball team retained the "Rainbows" nickname; the men's basketball, swimming and diving, and tennis teams adopted "Rainbow Warriors"; the football, men's golf, and men's volleyball teams adopted "Warriors"; and all women's teams adopted the nickname "Rainbow Wahine". In 2013, the university announced that all men's teams would become "Rainbow Warriors" effective with the start of the 2013–14 school year. In one more recently added women's sport, beach volleyball, the official nickname remains "Rainbow Wahine", but that team has mostly deprecated it in favor of "SandBows".
- Hawaii Pacific Sharks, changed from "Sea Warriors" in 2014
- Hillsdale Chargers, changed from "Dales" in 1968
- Hofstra Pride, formerly the "Flying Dutchmen"
- Huron Screaming Eagles, known as the "Scalpers", which was unofficially dropped in 1973; the "Tribe" then came into usage, was officially adopted in 1975, and remained until about 1997
- Husson Eagles, formerly the "Braves"
- Ithaca Bombers, formerly the "Blue Team", "Blues", "Blue and Gold", "Collegians" and "Seneca Streeters." The name was changed to the "Cayugas" by a student vote in 1937. The origin of the nickname "Bombers" is unclear, but the first known reference was in a December 17, 1938 issue of the Rochester Times-Union article on the basketball team. Some faculty have expressed reservations of the current nickname's martial connotations.
- IUP Crimson Hawks, changed from the "Indians" in 2006; "Indians" nickname was coined in 1930 by a sports writer for the Indiana Gazette
- Iowa State Cyclones, changed from "Cardinals" in 1895
- Jacksonville State Gamecocks – When the school was known as Jacksonville State Normal School, the nickname was Eagle Owls. In 1946, by which time the school had become Jacksonville State Teachers College, a group of fans wanted a mascot more emblematic of Southern American culture. Another group of fans supposedly wanted a change in school colors from the original blue and gold. According to local lore, both camps got their wish; Jacksonville State's nickname became Gamecocks in 1947, with teams wearing the red and white still in use today.
- Johnson Royals, changed from the "Preachers" and "Lady Evangels" to the "Royals" in 2013
- Juniata Eagles, changed from "Indians" in 1994
- Kansas City Roos – As part of the 2019 rebranding of the University of Missouri–Kansas City athletic program from "UMKC" to "Kansas City", the nickname was shortened from the historic "Kangaroos" to "Roos" (which had been in use alongside "Kangaroos" for many years). Only the athletic program was rebranded; the university name remains unchanged, and "UMKC" is still used for academic branding purposes.
- Kansas State Wildcats, changed from the "Aggies" and the "Farmers" in 1915, before reverting to the old nicknames that same year, when the school was known as the Kansas State Agricultural College. It was changed permanently in 1920. The school changed its name to Kansas State University later.
- Kent State Golden Flashes, changed from the "Silver Foxes" in 1927
- Kentucky Wildcats, formerly "Blue and White" through 1909
- Kenyon Owls, changed from "Lords" and "Ladies" in 2022; the teams were earlier known as the "Mauve", the "Purple", the "Purple and White", the "Hilltoppers", and simply as "Kenyon".
- Keuka Wolves, known as the "Storm" until 2014 and as the "Wolfpack" from 2014 to 2016, a nickname changed upon threat of legal action from North Carolina State University
- Knox Prairie Fire, known as the "Old Siwash" or "Siwash" until 1993
- Kutztown Golden Bears, known as the "Golden Avalanche" from the mid-1930s until 1961 when "Golden Bears" was adopted.
- Lehigh Mountain Hawks, changed from the "Engineers" in 1995
- Long Beach State Beach (or "The Beach"), officially known as 49ers before 2020–21, although the school had been transitioning to "The Beach" for several years. The baseball team continues to use Dirtbags.
- Louisiana Ragin' Cajuns, changed from the "Bulldogs" to Raging Cajuns in the early 1960s. The "g" was dropped from the end of the first word later.
- Louisiana–Monroe Warhawks, changed from the "Indians" in 2006
- Loyola Ramblers, changed from "Grandees" around 1926; the earlier nickname was selected in a contest held by the student newspaper but failed to catch on.
- Macalester Scots, adopted in 1930; formerly known as the "Macs"
- Maranatha Baptist Sabercats – Changed from "Crusaders" in 2014.
- Marquette Golden Eagles, changed from the "Warriors" in 1994, which had been used at least since 1960.
- Marshall Thundering Herd, made official in the mid-1960s, although it was in unofficial use since the 1930s alongside the nickname the "Big Green".
- Maryland Terrapins, made official in 1932, although in unofficial use earlier; formerly the "Old Liners", and before that, the "Aggies" and "Farmers" when the school was known as Maryland Agricultural College.
- Maryville Scots, formerly the "Highlanders"
- MCLA Trailblazers, formerly the "Mohawks", changed in 2002
- McMurry War Hawks, known as the "Indians" until that nickname was dropped in 2006
- Memphis Tigers, originally adopted in 1915 when the school was known as the West Tennessee State Normal School, but changed to "Teachers" and "Tutors" when the school name was changed to West Tennessee State Teachers College. In 1939, the Tigers nickname was reintroduced. The school later changed its name to Memphis State College and then the University of Memphis.
- Miami RedHawks, changed from the "Redskins" in 1997, the team had previously been known as the "Big Reds", the "Reds and Whites", the "Red-Skinned Warriors", and the "Miami Boys".
- Michigan State Spartans, changed from "Aggies" in 1925, which had been used contemporaneously with the unofficial nicknames of the "Fighting Farmers" and "Farmers".
- Middle Tennessee Blue Raiders, adopted in 1934 to replace a "wide range of names"
- Midwestern State Mustangs, changed from "Indians" in November 2005
- Milwaukee Panthers, changed from "Cardinals" in 1964, when the school was branded athletically as "Wisconsin–Milwaukee". There was an earlier nickname change, but that coincided with a merger that resulted in a change of the school name. For that change, see below.
- Minnesota State Mavericks, changed from "Indians" on July 1, 1977, when the school was known as "Mankato State".
- Mississippi State Bulldogs, changed from "Maroons" in 1961, they were known as the "Aggies" under the school changed its name from Mississippi A&M in 1932.
- Montclair State Red Hawks, changed from "Indians" in 1989
- Morningside Mustangs, changed from "Chiefs" in 1998; known as the "Maroons" from about 1910 until the late 1950s
- Murray State Racers, changed from "Thoroughbreds" in 1961. However, the baseball team, which had just bought new uniforms before the change was announced, asked to defer its nickname change for a year. Reaction to this move was favorable enough that the baseball team continued to use "Thoroughbreds" until adopting "Racers" in 2014.
- Nebraska Cornhuskers, adopted in 1900 after ten years without an official nickname. Previous teams had sometimes been referred to as the "Antelopes", "Bugeaters", "Old Gold Knights", "Rattlesnake Boys", and "Treeplanters"
- Nebraska Wesleyan Prairie Wolves, changed from "Coyotes" to "Plainsmen" in 1933 and to "Prairie Wolves" in 2000
- Nevada Wolf Pack, adopted in 1923, they had previously been known as the "Sagebrushers" and "Sage Hens"
- Newberry Wolves, adopted in 2010 to replace "Indians", which had been dropped two years earlier. The teams had competed without a nickname in the interim.
- North Carolina State Wolfpack, adopted in 1922, previous nicknames had included the "Aggies", "Farmers", "Techs", and "Red Terrors"
- Norfolk State Spartans, the Norfolk State Spartans football team was known as the "Baby Trojans" before changing to "Spartans" in October 1952
- North Dakota Fighting Hawks, first known as the "Flickertails" until 1930, at which time "Fighting Sioux" was adopted.
- North Georgia Saints and Lady Saints — The first sports teams at what was then North Georgia College & State University were men's teams known as "Cadets", a nod to the school's status as a senior military college. When basketball became the first women's sport, that team was initially known as the "Golddiggers", referencing the school's location in the old gold-mining town of Dahlonega. By the late 1970s, the athletic program had settled on "Saints" and "Lady Saints". NGCSU no longer exists under that name, as it was merged into the University of North Georgia in 2013 with the new nickname of "Nighthawks" (see below).
- North Greenville Trailblazers, adopted in 2024; the football team was referred to as "Moonshiners" in 1924; the school's nickname was "Black Widow Spiders" from 1950 to 1953, "Mountaineers" or "Mounties" from 1953 to 2001, and "Crusaders from 2001 to 2024; the women's basketball team was called the "Lassies" from 1958 to 1969.
- North Texas Mean Green, formerly known as the "Eagles" (1922–1966), there are conflicting accounts on the origin of the nickname.
- Northeastern State RiverHawks, dropped Redmen in May 2006, adopted RiverHawks on November 14, 2006
- Northern Illinois Huskies, adopted in 1940, previous names had included "Cardinals", "Evansmen", "Northerners", "Profs", and "Teachers"
- Northwest Nazarene Nighthawks, changed from "Crusaders" in 2017.
- Northwestern Wildcats, changed from the "Purple" in 1924
- Notre Dame Fighting Irish, officially adopted in 1927, although it had been in use much earlier. Other nicknames included the "Catholics" in the 1880s and 1890s, and the "Ramblers" in the 1920s.
- Ohio Bobcats, replaced the "Green and White" in 1925
- Oklahoma Sooners, replaced the "Rough Riders" and "Boomers" in 1908
- Oklahoma City Stars, formerly "Goldbugs" prior to 1946 and the "Chiefs" thereafter
- Oklahoma State Cowboys and Cowgirls — Oklahoma A&M used the nickname of the "Agriculturalists" in the 1890s, which was shortened to "Aggies" and "Farmers". "Tigers" was briefly used as well, but proved unpopular. In 1924, the media began referring to the teams as the "Cowboys" and it was later officially adopted.
- Ole Miss Rebels, changed from the "Flood" in 1935 because of the negative association with natural disasters, most notably the 1927 flood that devastated the state's Delta region.
- Omaha Mavericks, adopted in the summer of 1971, previously known as "Indians" from 1939 to 1971
- Oregon Ducks, formerly the "Webfoots." "Ducks" introduced in the 1940s and nicknames were used interchangeably until the 1970s; "Ducks" officially adopted in 1978.
- Oregon State Beavers, previously known as the "Aggies" and then the "Orangemen". The yearbook was named The Beaver in 1916, which later led to the athletics teams' adoption of the nickname.
- Pacific Boxers, changed from "Badgers" in 1968
- Presbyterian Blue Hose — Officially changed from "Blue Stockings" c. 1954, though sportswriters had used "Hose" interchangeably with "Stockings" since the turn of the 20th century.
- Quinnipiac Bobcats, changed from the "Braves" in 2002
- Richmond Spiders, changed from the "Colts" in 1894.
- Rio Grande RedStorm, changed from the "Redmen" and "Redwomen" in 2008.
- Ripon Red Hawks, changed from "Redmen" in 1994
- Rutgers Scarlet Knights, changed from the "Queensmen" in 1955
- Samford Bulldogs, adopted in December 1916; previously called "Crimson and Blue" and "Baptists"; Samford University was known as Howard College until 1965
- St. Bonaventure Bonnies, changed from the "Brown Indians" and "Brown Squaws" in 1979
- St. John's Red Storm, changed from the "Redmen" in 1994 for gender and cultural considerations.
- Saint Francis Red Wolves, changed from the "Red Flash" in 2026, coinciding with the university's move from NCAA Division I to Division III
- Saint Leo Lions, formerly the "Monarchs", changed in 1999
- Saint Mary's Cardinals, changed from "Redmen" in 1988
- San Diego State Aztecs, replaced the "Staters" and "Professors" in 1925
- Santa Clara Broncos, adopted in 1923; prior nicknames included the "Missionites", the "Prunepickers", the "Friars", the "Missions", and the "Padres" The school changed its name from the "University of Santa Clara" to "Santa Clara University" in 1985.
- Seattle Redhawks, formerly the "Chieftains"
- Sioux Falls Cougars, changed from "Braves" in 1978
- Sonoma State Seawolves, changed from "Cossacks" in 2002
- Southeast Missouri State Redhawks, known as the "Indians" and "Otahkians" before 2004
- Southeastern Oklahoma State Savage Storm, changed from "Savages" in 2006
- South Florida Bulls, shortened from "Brahman Bulls" in the mid-1980s
- Southern Jaguars and Lady Jaguars, changed from "Cats" to "Bushmen" in 1931
- Southern Illinois Salukis, formerly known at the "Maroons" from 1913 to 1951
- Southern Miss Golden Eagles, adopted in 1972, the school had several previous nicknames, including "Normalites", "Yellow Jackets", "Confederates", and "Southerners"
- Southern Nazarene Crimson Storm, changed from the "Redskins" in 1998
- Southern Utah Thunderbirds, changed from "Broncos" in April 1961
- Southwestern Moundbuilders, adopted in 1910; prevoiously known as the "Methodists" and "Preachers"
- Spalding Golden Eagles, formerly the "Pelicans"
- Springfield Pride, changed from "Chiefs" in 1996
- SUNY Canton Roos, changed from "Northstars" in 2007
- Susquehanna River Hawks, changed from "Crusaders" in 2016
- Stanford Cardinal, adopted in 1981, formerly known as the "Indians" (1930–1972) and the plural "Cardinals" (1972–1981)
- Stonehill Skyhawks, changed from the "Chieftains"
- Stony Brook Seawolves, adopted in 1994; previously known as "Soundmen" or "Baymen" (1950s), Warriors (1960–1966), and "Patriots"/"Lady Patriots" (1966–1994)
- Syracuse Orange, changed from "Orangemen" and "Orangewomen" in 2004
- Tennessee at Chattanooga Mocs, changed from Moccasins in 1997.
- TCU Horned Frogs, adopted in 1915, formerly known as the "Christians"
- Texas Tech Red Raiders, changed from "Matadors" (1925–1932), which had been inspired by the campus's Spanish architecture.
- Toledo Rockets, adopted in 1923 by sportswriters who shortened it from "Skyrockets", coined by a student in the press box for a football game. Writers had previously called the football team the "Blue and Gold" and "Munies".
- Troy Trojans, reverted from "Red Wave" in 1973. Troy had been known as first the Bulldogs" and then the "Teachers" between 1909 and 1920, the "Trojans" from 1920 to 1931, and the "Red Wave" from 1931 to 1973.
- Tulane Green Wave, known as the "Olive and Blue" from 1893 to 1919, and referred to as the "Greenbacks" by the student-run The Tulane Weekly in 1919. Became known as the "Green Wave" from 1920 after the song "The Rolling Green Wave" published in the Tulane Hullabaloo.
- Tulsa Golden Hurricane, adopted in 1922, formerly known as the "Orange and Black", "Kendallites", "Presbyterians", "Tigers", "Tulsans", and "Yellow Jackets".
- UCLA Bruins, adopted in 1928, formerly known as the "Cubs" until 1923, in reference to the school's connection to the University of California Golden Bears. Known as the "Grizzlies" from 1923 until 1928, when UCLA joined the Pacific Coast Conference, which already included the Montana Grizzlies.
- UC Santa Barbara Gauchos, changed in 1936 from Roadrunners. Football coach Theodore "Spud" Harder requested a new name when he took over in 1934. A student vote settled on "Gauchos" in 1936, based on the 1927 film The Gaucho
- UC Santa Cruz Banana Slugs, changed in 1986 by student referendum from "Sea Lions", which had been used since the school began sponsoring NCAA athletics in 1981.
- UCF Knights, reverted from "Golden Knights" from 1993 to 2007.
- UConn Huskies, officially adopted as the nickname in 1934; they had previous been unofficially known as the "Aggies" and the "Statesmen". "UConn", long used as a short form for the school's formal name of "University of Connecticut", became the official athletic brand in 2013–14.
- UMass Minutemen, changed from the "Redmen" and "Redwomen" in 1972. According to the university, the old nickname referred to the uniforms worn by the athletic teams, but it was changed nonetheless out of sensitivity to American Indians.
- Union Garnet Chargers, changes from "Dutchmen" and "Dutchwomen" in 2023
- USC Trojans, replaced the "Methodists" and "Wesleyans" in 1912
- USP Devils, formerly the "Red Devils"
- UT Martin Skyhawks, changed from "Pacers" in 1995
- Utah Utes, formerly used "Redskins" nickname simultaneously with "Utes" nickname but discontinued using "Redskins" in 1972
- Utah Tech Trailblazers, changed from "Flyers" to in December 1951 when the school was called Dixie Junior College, then from "Rebels" to "Red Storm" in 2009, and to "Trailblazers" in 2016 when the school was known as Dixie State University
- UVA Wise Cavaliers – Formerly nicknamed "Highland Cavaliers"; dropped "Highland" in 2017.
- Valparaiso Beacons – Dropped the longtime "Crusaders" nickname in February 2021 due to negative associations with violence, as well as use of "crusader" imagery by certain hate groups. The new nickname of "Beacons" was announced on August 10 of that year.
- VCU Rams – The "Rams" nickname was inherited from Richmond Professional Institute, one of the two institutions that merged in 1968 to form the current Virginia Commonwealth University. From 1948 to 1963, RPI's nickname was "Green Devils", reflecting the school's affiliation with The College of William & Mary. RPI and several other institutions were separated from W&M in 1962, and RPI adopted "Rams" a year later.
- Virginia Tech Hokies, gradually transitioned from the original nickname of the "Fighting Gobblers"
- Washington Huskies, adopted February 3, 1922; formerly the "Sun Dodgers" (1919–1921) and very briefly the "Vikings" in December 1921
- Wayne State Warriors, known as the "Tartars" from 1927 to 1999
- Western Connecticut Wolves, changed from "Indians" to "Colonials" in December 1974 and then to "Wolves" in April 2022
- West Georgia Wolves, changed in 2006 from "Braves", which had been used since the 1930s
- Western Michigan Broncos, changed from "Hilltoppers" in 1939
- Wheaton Thunder, changed from "Crusaders" in 2000
- Widener Pride, changed from "Pioneers" in 2006
- Willamette Bearcats, adopted in November 1915; previously known as the "Methodists" and "Missionaries"
- Wisconsin–La Crosse Eagles, known as Indians from 1937 to 1989
- Wisconsin–Whitewater Warhawks, changed from Quakers in 1958
- Wooster Fighting Scots, "Scots" adopted in October 1931; previously known as the "Presbyterians", "Golden Knights", "Black Bears", and "Grenadiers"

=== Changes of women's team nicknames only ===
- Austin Peay Governors – Historically, women's teams had been "Lady Govs", but all teams became "Governors" no later than the 2015–16 school year.
- Baylor Bears – Historically, women's teams had been "Lady Bears". By the end of the 2010s, most teams had dropped "Lady" from the nickname, and the last three holdouts of basketball, soccer, and volleyball did the same for the 2021–22 school year.
- Colorado Buffaloes — Women's teams were the "Lady Buffs" until 1993, when the school announced it would adopt the men's nickname for all teams.
- Eastern New Mexico Greyhounds — Women's teams were the "Zias" from the establishment of women's sports at the school in the 1970s until 2015, when the school announced it would adopt the men's nickname for all teams.
- New Mexico State Aggies — Women's athletic teams were known as the "Roadrunners" until 2000, following a vote by female athletes to adopt the same nickname as the men's teams.
- Tarleton State Texans — The school's first varsity women's teams played under the men's nickname of "Texans" in the 1968–69 school year, but female athletes expressed a desire for a distinctive nickname, and the women's nickname was changed the following year—although the spellings of "Texanns", "Tex-Anns", and "TexAnns" were all used before the "TexAnns" spelling was adopted in 1972. During the 2018–19 school year, two players and a student manager in the women's basketball program began a campaign to return the women's nickname to "Texans", and after receiving overwhelming support from other female athletes, the school approved the change effective in 2019–20.
- Tennessee Volunteers — In November 2014, the university announced that after the 2014–15 school year, only women's basketball would retain the Lady Volunteers nickname. At that time, all other women's teams became simply Volunteers. This change was reversed during the 2017–18 school year, with all women's teams once again allowed to use "Lady Volunteers" if they so wish.
- Washburn Ichabods — Women's teams were known as "Lady Blues" until 2013, when the school announced that women's teams would adopt the men's nickname.
- Western Illinois Leathernecks —Women's teams were known as "Westerwinds" until 2009, when they adopted the men's nickname of Leathernecks.
- A number of schools historically used the "Lady" prefix for all women's teams, but now have a policy of using "Lady" only in sports that have both men's and women's teams. Schools that have this policy include:
  - LSU Tigers and Lady Tigers
  - Texas Tech Red Raiders and Lady Raiders

=== As a result of a school name change or merger ===
- Case Western Reserve Spartans – Before the schools merged, Case Institute of Technology used the nicknames of the "Scientists" (1918–1938) and the "Rough Riders (1930–1971). Western Reserve was known as the "Pioneers" (1921–1928) and the "Red Cats" (1928–1971). While the schools merged in 1967, the undergraduate student bodies (and athletic departments) were separate until 1971, and during the transition, Western Reserve used the athletic identity of its undergraduate arm, Adelbert College.
- Cleveland State Vikings – Fenn College used the nickname of the "Foxes" until the school was renamed in 1965.
- Coastal Carolina Chanticleers – When Coastal was founded in 1954 as a junior college, the school's nickname was "Trojans". It adopted its current nickname shortly after becoming a part of the University of South Carolina in 1960, due to a desire for a nickname more compatible with the "Gamecocks" of its parent. The nickname remained even after Coastal became an independent institution in 1993.
- Colorado State Rams – Colorado A&M used the nickname of the "Aggies".
- Lewis & Clark Pioneers – used the nickname "Pirates" from 1919 to 1938 when the school was known as Albany College.
- LIU Sharks – Established in 2019 when Long Island University merged its two previous NCAA athletic programs—the Division I LIU Brooklyn Blackbirds and Division II LIU Post Pioneers. Only the athletic programs merged; the Brooklyn and Post campuses are separately accredited and remain in operation. The Sharks inherited the Division I membership of the Brooklyn campus.
- Maryland Terrapins – Maryland Agricultural College used the nickname of the "Aggies" and the "Farmers". The school was renamed Maryland State College in 1916 and the University of Maryland in 1920.
- Michigan State Spartans – Michigan Agricultural College used the nickname of the "Aggies" alongside unofficial nicknames of the "Fighting Farmers" and "Farmers" until 1925.
- Milwaukee Panthers – The institution through which the current University of Wisconsin–Milwaukee traces its history, originally the Wisconsin State Normal School and after several name changes Wisconsin State College–Milwaukee, used "Green Gulls" as its nickname until 1956. At that time, it merged with the University of Wisconsin's graduate extension campus in Milwaukee to form UW–Milwaukee, with the nickname changing to "Cardinals".
- Mississippi State Bulldogs – Mississippi A&M changed its nickname from the "Aggies" to the "Maroons" when the school was renamed Mississippi State College in 1932. In 1961, the school was renamed Mississippi State University and the nickname was changed to the "Bulldogs".
- NC State Wolfpack – North Carolina College of Agriculture and Mechanic Arts (North Carolina A&M) was known as the "Aggies" or "Farmers". The school changed its name to the current North Carolina State University in 1917.
- North Georgia Nighthawks – In January 2013, North Georgia College & State University, nicknamed "Saints" and "Lady Saints", was merged with Gainesville State College, a two-year technical school with no athletic program, to create the University of North Georgia. The new school adopted the nickname of "Nighthawks" for all teams.
- UConn Huskies – Connecticut Agricultural College used the nickname "Aggies". The school was renamed Connecticut State College in 1933, and the following year, the "Huskies" nickname was adopted.
- UMass Lowell River Hawks – The University of Lowell, itself the product of a 1971 merger between Lowell State College and the Lowell Technological Institute, used "Chiefs" as its nickname before it was absorbed into the University of Massachusetts system in 1991.
- UT Southern FireHawks – In 2021, Martin Methodist College, nicknamed "RedHawks", sold its campus to the University of Tennessee system, becoming the University of Tennessee Southern.
- UTRGV Vaqueros – In November 2014, the University of Texas Rio Grande Valley, which began full operation in July 2015 with the merger of the University of Texas–Pan American (UTPA) and University of Texas at Brownsville, announced that the nickname of the new school would be Vaqueros. The pre-merger UTPA Broncs became the UTRGV athletic program after the merger.

== Junior colleges ==
- Imperial Valley Desert Warriors, adopted in 2023; known as the "Arabs" from the 1950s until 2021
- Pasadena City Lancers, changed from "Bulldogs" in 1954 when Pasadena City College merged with John Muir College; Muir's teams were known as the "Mustangs"
- Saddleback Bobcats, change from "Gauchos" in 2021
- San Bernardino Valley Wolverines, changed from "Indians" in January 2001
- Southwestern Jaguars, changed from Apaches in May 2001
- West Los Angeles Wildcats, changed from "Oilers" in 2008, which was adopted in 1969
- Yakima Valley Yaks, changed from "Indians" in 1998

== See also ==
- Native American mascot controversy
