= List of colleges and universities in Arkansas =

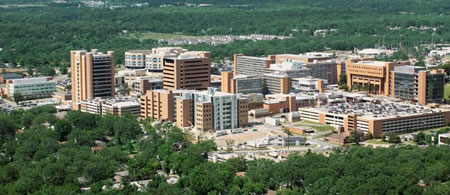
UAMS is the flagship health education institution of the state.

This is a list of colleges and universities in Arkansas. This list also includes other educational institutions providing higher education, meaning tertiary, quaternary, and, in some cases, post-secondary education.

== Institutions ==
List of colleges and universities in Arkansas
School	Location	Control	Type	Enrollment (Fall 2024)	Founded	Accreditation
Arkansas Baptist College	Little Rock	Private	Baccalaureate college	342	1884	HLC
Arkansas Colleges of Health Education	Fort Smith	Private	Medical School	870	2014	HLC
Arkansas Northeastern College	Blytheville	Public	Associate's college	1,461	1975	HLC
Arkansas State University	Jonesboro	Public	Research university	15,726	1909	HLC
Arkansas State University-Beebe	Beebe	Public	Associate's college	3,277	1927	HLC
Arkansas State University Mid-South	West Memphis	Public	Associate's college	1,022	1992	HLC
Arkansas State University–Mountain Home	Mountain Home	Public	Associate's college	1,315	1995	HLC
Arkansas State University-Newport	Newport	Public	Associate's college	1,868	1976	HLC
Arkansas State University Three Rivers	Malvern	Public	Associate's college	1,983	1969	HLC
Arkansas Tech University	Russellville	Public	Master's university	8,746	1909	HLC
Black River Technical College	Pocahontas	Public	Associate's college	1,705	1978	HLC
Central Baptist College	Conway	Private	Baccalaureate college	547	1952	HLC
Cossatot Community College	De Queen	Public	Associate's college	1,312	1975	HLC
Crowley's Ridge College	Paragould	Private (Churches of Christ)	Baccalaureate college	241	1964	HLC
East Arkansas Community College	Forrest City	Public	Associate's college	1,401	1974	HLC
Ecclesia College	Springdale	Private	Special-focus institution (Bible college)	111	1975	ABHE
Harding University	Searcy	Private (Churches of Christ)	Master's university	4,696	1924	HLC
Henderson State University	Arkadelphia	Public	Master's university	2,055	1890	HLC
Hendrix College	Conway	Private (United Methodist Church)	Baccalaureate college	1,110	1876	HLC
John Brown University	Siloam Springs	Private	Baccalaureate college	2,350	1919	HLC
Lyon College	Batesville	Private (Presbyterian Church (U.S.A.))	Baccalaureate college	659	1872	HLC
National Park College	Hot Springs	Public	Associate's college	1,805	2003	HLC
North Arkansas College	Harrison	Public	Associate's college	2,089	1974	HLC
Northwest Arkansas Community College	Bentonville	Public	Associate's college	12,022	1989	HLC
Ouachita Baptist University	Arkadelphia	Private (Southern Baptist Convention)	Baccalaureate college	1,858	1886	HLC
Ozarka College	Melbourne	Public	Associate's college	1,069	1975	HLC
Philander Smith University	Little Rock	Private (United Methodist Church)	Baccalaureate college	780	1877	HLC
Phillips Community College of the University of Arkansas	Helena-West Helena	Public	Associate's college	1,199	1965	HLC
Shorter College	North Little Rock	Private (African Methodist Episcopal Church)	Associate's college	287	1886	TRACS
South Arkansas College	El Dorado	Public	Associate's college	1,207	1992	HLC
Southeast Arkansas College	Pine Bluff	Public	Associate's college	916	1991	HLC
Southern Arkansas University	Magnolia	Public	Master's university	4,732	1909	HLC
Southern Arkansas University Tech	Camden	Public	Associate's college	991	1967	HLC
Strayer University	Little Rock	Private for-profit	Special focus institution	741	1892	MSCHE
University of Arkansas	Fayetteville	Public	Research university	33,610	1871	HLC
University of Arkansas Community College at Batesville	Batesville	Public	Associate's college	1,192	1991	HLC
University of Arkansas Community College at Hope	Hope	Public	Associate's college	1,305	1965	HLC
University of Arkansas Community College at Morrilton	Morrilton	Public	Associate's college	2,248	1961	HLC
University of Arkansas Grantham	Online Campus	Public	Master's university	5,646	1951	Accredited by the DEAC (Distance Education Accrediting Commission). Recognized by the AHECB to offer degrees in collaboration with UA System institutions.
University of Arkansas at Little Rock	Little Rock	Public	Research university	8,216	1927	HLC
University of Arkansas at Monticello	Monticello	Public	Master's university	2,856	1909	HLC
University of Arkansas at Pine Bluff	Pine Bluff	Public	Baccalaureate college	2,005	1873	HLC
University of Arkansas Rich Mountain	Mena	Public	Associate's college	786	1973	HLC
University of Arkansas for Medical Sciences	Little Rock	Public	Medical school	3,485	1879	HLC
University of Arkansas–Fort Smith	Fort Smith	Public	Baccalaureate college	5,496	1928	HLC
University of Arkansas – Pulaski Technical College	North Little Rock	Public	Associate's college	4,478	1945	HLC
University of Central Arkansas	Conway	Public	Master's university	10,112	1907	HLC
University of the Ozarks	Clarksville	Private (Presbyterian Church (U.S.A.))	Baccalaureate college	778	1834	HLC
Williams Baptist University	Walnut Ridge	Private (Southern Baptist Convention)	Master's University	517	1941	HLC

== Defunct institutions ==
- Arkansas College (Fayetteville). Fayetteville, Arkansas
- Buckner College, Witcherville, Arkansas
- Judsonia University, Judsonia, Arkansas
- Little Rock Commercial College and Telegraph Institute
- Little Rock College
- St. Johns' College (Little Rock)
- Stuttgart College
- Southeast College of Technology (now Remington College)

Key
Abbreviation	Accrediting agency
AAMFT	American Association for Marriage and Family Therapy
AANA	American Association of Nurse Anesthetists
ABA	American Bar Association
ACICS	Accrediting Council for Independent Colleges and Schools
ACME	Accreditation Commission for Midwifery Education
ACPE	Accreditation Council for Pharmacy Education
ADA	American Dental Association
ADA	American Dietetic Association
AOTA	American Occupational Therapy Association
APA	American Psychological Association
APTA	American Physical Therapy Association
ASHA	American Speech–Language–Hearing Association
CCNE	Commission on Collegiate Nursing Education
JRCERT	Joint Review Committee on Education Programs in Radiologic Technology
LCME	Liaison Committee on Medical Education
MSCHE	Middle States Association of Colleges and Schools
NASAD	National Association of Schools of Art and Design
NASD	National Association of Schools of Dance
NASM	National Association of Schools of Music
NAST	National Association of Schools of Theatre
HLC	Higher Learning Commission
NCATE	National Council for Accreditation of Teacher Education
NLNAC	National League for Nursing

== See also ==
- List of college athletic programs in Arkansas
- Higher education in the United States
- List of American institutions of higher education
- List of recognized higher education accreditation organizations
- List of colleges and universities
- List of colleges and universities by country
