= List of college athletic programs in Arkansas =

This is a list of college athletic programs in the U.S. state of Arkansas.

== NCAA ==
=== Division I ===
Full NCAA Division I Members in Arkansas
- FBS Football, - FCS Football, - Non-Football

Team	School	City	Conference	Sport sponsorship						
Team	School	City	Conference	Football	Basketball		Baseball	Softball	Soccer	
Team	School	City	Conference	Football	M	W	Baseball	Softball	M	W
Arkansas Razorbacks	University of Arkansas	Fayetteville	SEC	FBS	Yes	Yes	Yes	Yes	No	Yes
Arkansas State Red Wolves	Arkansas State University	Jonesboro	Sun Belt	FBS	Yes	Yes	Yes	No	No	Yes
UAPB Golden Lions	University of Arkansas at Pine Bluff	Pine Bluff	SWAC	FCS	Yes	Yes	Yes	Yes	No	Yes
Central Arkansas Bears & Sugar Bears	University of Central Arkansas	Conway	UAC	FCS	Yes	Yes	Yes	Yes	Yes	Yes
Little Rock Trojans	University of Arkansas at Little Rock	Little Rock	Ohio Valley	No	Yes	Yes	Yes	No	No	Yes

=== Division II ===
NCAA Division II members in Arkansas
- Football, - Non-Football

Team	School	City	Conference	Sport sponsorship						
Team	School	City	Conference	Football	Basketball		Baseball	Softball	Soccer	
Team	School	City	Conference	Football	M	W	Baseball	Softball	M	W
Arkansas Tech Wonder Boys & Golden Suns	Arkansas Tech University	Russellville	Great American	Yes	Yes	Yes	Yes	Yes	No	No
UAFS Lions	University of Arkansas at Fort Smith	Fort Smith	MIAA	No	Yes	Yes	Yes	No	No	No
UA Monticello Boll Weevils & Cotton Blossoms	University of Arkansas at Monticello	Monticello	Great American	Yes	Yes	Yes	Yes	Yes	No	No
Harding Bisons	Harding University	Searcy	Great American	Yes	Yes	Yes	Yes	Yes	Yes	Yes
Henderson State Reddies	Henderson State University	Arkadelphia	Great American	Yes	Yes	Yes	Yes	Yes	No	No
Ouachita Baptist Tigers	Ouachita Baptist University	Arkadelphia	Great American	Yes	Yes	Yes	Yes	Yes	Yes	Yes
Southern Arkansas Muleriders	Southern Arkansas University	Magnolia	Great American	Yes	Yes	Yes	Yes	Yes	No	No

=== Division III ===
NCAA Division III members in Arkansas
- Football, - Non-Football

Team	School	City	Conference	Sport sponsorship						
Team	School	City	Conference	Football	Basketball		Baseball	Softball	Soccer	
Team	School	City	Conference	Football	M	W	Baseball	Softball	M	W
Hendrix Warriors	Hendrix College	Conway	SCAC	Yes	Yes	Yes	Yes	Yes	Yes	Yes
Lyon Scots	Lyon College	Batesville	SLIAC	Yes (Note: Lyon's football team competes in the Southern Collegiate Athletic Conference.)	Yes	Yes	Yes	Yes	Yes	Yes
Ozarks Eagles	University of the Ozarks	Clarksville	SCAC	No	Yes	Yes	Yes	Yes	Yes	Yes

== NAIA ==
NAIA members in Arkansas
- Football, - Non-Football

Team	School	City	Conference	Sport sponsorship						
Team	School	City	Conference	Football	Basketball		Baseball	Softball	Soccer	
Team	School	City	Conference	Football	M	W	Baseball	Softball	M	W
Arkansas Baptist Buffaloes	Arkansas Baptist College	Little Rock	Continental	Yes (Note: Arkansas Baptist's football program plays as an associate member of the Sooner Athletic Conference.)	Yes	Yes	Yes	Yes	No	No
Central Baptist Mustangs	Central Baptist College	Conway	American Midwest	No	Yes	Yes	Yes	Yes	Yes	Yes
Champion Christian Tigers	Champion Christian College	Hot Springs	Continental	No	Yes	Yes	Yes	No	Yes	Yes
Crowley's Ridge Pioneers	Crowley's Ridge College	Paragould	American Midwest	No	Yes	Yes	Yes	Yes	No	No
John Brown Golden Eagles	John Brown University	Siloam Springs	Sooner	No	Yes	Yes	No	No	Yes	Yes
Philander Smith Panthers	Philander Smith University	Little Rock	HBCU	No	Yes	Yes	Yes	No	No	No
Williams Baptist Eagles	Williams Baptist University	Walnut Ridge	American Midwest	No	Yes	Yes	Yes	Yes	Yes	Yes

== NJCAA ==
Team	School	City	Conference
ASU Mid-South Greyhounds	Arkansas State University Mid-South	West Memphis	Bi-State
ASU-Mountain Home Trailblazers	Arkansas State University-Mountain Home	Mountain Home	Bi-State
ASU-Newport Aviators	Arkansas State University-Newport	Newport	Bi-State
ASU-Three Rivers Eagles	Arkansas State University Three Rivers	Malvern	Bi-State
NPC Nighthawks	National Park College	Hot Springs	Bi-State
North Arkansas Pioneers	North Arkansas College	Harrison	Bi-State
NWACC Eagles	Northwest Arkansas Community College	Bentonville	Bi-State
Shorter Bulldogs	Shorter College	North Little Rock	Bi-State
South Arkansas Stars	South Arkansas Community College	El Dorado	Bi-State
SEARK Sharks	Southeast Arkansas College	Pine Bluff	Bi-State
SAU Tech Rockets	Southern Arkansas University Tech	Camden	Bi-State
UA Rich Mountain Bucks	University of Arkansas Rich Mountain	Mena	Bi-State
UA Cossatot Colts	University of Arkansas Cossatot	De Queen	Bi-State

== NCCAA ==
Team	School	City	Conference
Champion Christian Tigers	Champion Christian College	Hot Springs	Independent
Ecclesia Royals	Ecclesia College	Springdale	Independent

== See also ==
- List of NCAA Division I institutions
- List of NCAA Division II institutions
- List of NCAA Division III institutions
- List of NAIA institutions
- List of USCAA institutions
- List of NCCAA institutions
- List of NJCAA Division I institutions
- List of NJCAA Division II institutions
- List of NJCAA Division III institutions
