= List of junior college softball programs =

This is a list of schools of United States community colleges that offer a softball program. The two largest associations are the National Junior College Athletic Association (NJCAA) and California Community College Athletic Association (3C2A, prev. CCCAA). The Northwest Athletic Conference (NWAC) and the United States Collegiate Athletic Association (USCAA) also feature community colleges with softball programs as members.

In the NJCAA, 363 schools compete across three divisions of play, divided up into 24 different regions.

In California, 72 schools compete in nine different 3C2A conferences.

The Northwest Athletic Conference (NWAC), formerly the Northwest Athletic Association of Community Colleges, features 26 different schools competing across the Pacific Northwest in the U.S. states of Oregon and Washington, and the Canadian province of British Columbia.

The United States Collegiate Athletic Association (USCAA) features five different community colleges competing, primarily from the New England states.

Conference affiliations reflect those in the 2027 season. Years of conference changes, indicated in footnotes, reflect softball seasons, which take place in the calendar year after a conference change takes effect.

== NJCAA softball programs ==
| School | Nickname | Division | Region | State | Conference |
|---|---|---|---|---|---|
| Arizona Western College | Matadors | Division I | Region 1 | Arizona | ACCAC |
| Central Arizona College | Vaqueras | Division I | Region 1 | Arizona | ACCAC |
| Eastern Arizona College | Gila Monsters | Division I | Region 1 | Arizona | ACCAC |
| College of Southern Nevada | Coyotes | Division I | Region 1 | Nevada | ACCAC |
| Yavapai College | Roughriders | Division I | Region 1 | Arizona | ACCAC |
| Connors State College | Cowboys | Division I | Region 2 | Oklahoma | Bi-State Conference |
| Eastern Oklahoma State College | Mountaineers | Division I | Region 2 | Oklahoma | Bi-State Conference |
| Northeastern Oklahoma A&M College | Lady Norse | Division I | Region 2 | Oklahoma | Bi-State Conference |
| Northern Oklahoma Enid | Jets | Division I | Region 2 | Oklahoma | Bi-State Conference |
| Northern Oklahoma Tonkawa | Mavericks | Division I | Region 2 | Oklahoma | Bi-State Conference |
| Rose State College | Raiders | Division I | Region 2 | Oklahoma | Bi-State Conference |
| Seminole State College (OK) | Trojans | Division I | Region 2 | Oklahoma | Bi-State Conference |
| Western Oklahoma State College | Pioneers | Division II | Region 2 | Oklahoma | Bi-State Conference |
| Cisco College | Wranglers | Division I | Region 5 | Texas | NTJCAC |
| Clarendon College | Bulldogs | Division I | Region 5 | Texas | WJCAC |
| El Paso Community College | Tejanas | Division I | Region 5 | Texas | WJCAC |
| Frank Phillips College | Plainsmen | Division I | Region 5 | Texas | WJCAC |
| Grayson College | Vikings | Division I | Region 5 | Texas | NTJCAC |
| Hill College | Rebels | Division I | Region 5 | Texas | NTJCAC |
| Howard College | Hawks | Division I | Region 5 | Texas | WJCAC |
| McLennan Community College | Highlassies | Division I | Region 5 | Texas | NTJCAC |
| Midland College | Chaps | Division I | Region 5 | Texas | WJCAC |
| North Central Texas College | Lions | Division I | Region 5 | Texas | NTJCAC |
| Odessa College | Wranglers | Division I | Region 5 | Texas | WJCAC |
| Ranger College | Rangers | Division I | Region 5 | Texas | NTJCAC |
| Temple College | Leopards | Division I | Region 5 | Texas | NTJCAC |
| Vernon College | Chaparrals | Division I | Region 5 | Texas | NTJCAC |
| Weatherford College | Coyotes | Division I | Region 5 | Texas | NTJCAC |
| Western Texas College | Westerners | Division I | Region 5 | Texas | WJCAC |
| Barton Community College | Cougars | Division I | Region 6 | Kansas | KJCCC |
| Butler Community College | Grizzlies | Division I | Region 6 | Kansas | KJCCC |
| Colby Community College | Trojans | Division I | Region 6 | Kansas | KJCCC |
| Dodge City Community College | Conquistadors | Division I | Region 6 | Kansas | KJCCC |
| Fort Hays Tech Northwest | Tigers | Division I | Region 6 | Kansas | KJCCC |
| Garden City Community College | Broncbusters | Division I | Region 6 | Kansas | KJCCC |
| Hutchinson Community College | Blue Dragons | Division I | Region 6 | Kansas | KJCCC |
| Pratt Community College | Beavers | Division I | Region 6 | Kansas | KJCCC |
| Seward County Community College | Saints | Division I | Region 6 | Kansas | KJCCC |
| Chattanooga State Community College | Tigers | Division II | Region 7 | Tennessee | TJCCAA |
| Cleveland State Community College | Cougars | Division I | Region 7 | Tennessee | TJCCAA |
| Columbia State Community College | Chargers | Division I | Region 7 | Tennessee | TJCCAA |
| Dyersburg State Community College | Eagles | Division I | Region 7 | Tennessee | TJCCAA |
| Jackson State Community College | Green Jays | Division I | Region 7 | Tennessee | TJCCAA |
| Motlow State Community College | Lady Bucks | Division I | Region 7 | Tennessee | TJCCAA |
| Pellissippi State Community College | Panthers | Division I | Region 7 | Tennessee | TJCCAA |
| Roane State Community College | Raiders | Division I | Region 7 | Tennessee | TJCCAA |
| Southwest Tennessee Community College | Saluqis | Division I | Region 7 | Tennessee | TJCCAA |
| Volunteer State Community College | Pioneers | Division I | Region 7 | Tennessee | TJCCAA |
| Walters State Community College | Lady Senators | Division I | Region 7 | Tennessee | TJCCAA |
| College of Central Florida | Patriots | Division I | Region 8 | Florida | Citrus |
| Chipola College | Indians | Division I | Region 8 | Florida | Panhandle |
| Daytona State College | Falcons | Division I | Region 8 | Florida | Citrus |
| Eastern Florida State College | Titans | Division I | Region 8 | Florida | Citrus |
| Florida Gateway College | Buccaneers | Division II | Region 8 | Florida | Sun-Lake |
| Florida SouthWestern State College | Buccaneers | Division I | Region 8 | Florida | Citrus |
| Gulf Coast State College | Commodores | Division I | Region 8 | Florida | Panhandle |
| Hillsborough Community College | Hawks | Division I | Region 8 | Florida | Citrus |
| Indian River State College | Pioneers | Division I | Region 8 | Florida | Citrus |
| Miami Dade College | Lady Sharks | Division I | Region 8 | Florida | Citrus |
| Northwest Florida State College | Raiders | Division I | Region 8 | Florida | Panhandle |
| Pensacola State College | Pirates | Division I | Region 8 | Florida | Panhandle |
| Polk State College | Eagles | Division I | Region 8 | Florida | Citrus |
| Santa Fe College | Saints | Division I | Region 8 | Florida | Citrus |
| Seminole State College of Florida | Raiders | Division I | Region 8 | Florida | Citrus |
| St. Petersburg College | Titans | Division I | Region 8 | Florida | Citrus |
| State College of Florida, Manatee–Sarasota | Manatees | Division II | Region 8 | Florida | Sun-Lakes |
| Tallahassee State College | Eagles | Division I | Region 8 | Florida | Panhandle |
| Lamar Community College | Runnin' Lopes | Division I | Region 9 | Colorado | CCCAC |
| Luna Community College | Rough Riders | Division I | Region 9 | New Mexico | WJCAC |
| McCook Community College | Indians | Division I | Region 9 | Nebraska | NCCAC |
| Northeastern Junior College | Plainswomen | Division I | Region 9 | Colorado | CCCAC |
| Otero College | Rattlers | Division I | Region 9 | Colorado | CCCAC |
| Trinidad State College | Trojans | Division I | Region 9 | Colorado | CCCAC |
| Western Nebraska Community College | Cougars | Division I | Region 9 | Nebraska | NCCAC |
| Florence–Darlington Technical College | Stingers | Division I | Region 10 | South Carolina | CJCC |
| Gaston College | Rhinos | Division I | Region 10 | North Carolina | CJCC |
| University of South Carolina Salkehatchie | Indians | Division I | Region 10 | North Carolina | CJCC |
| University of South Carolina Sumter | Fire Ants | Division I | Region 10 | South Carolina | CJCC |
| University of South Carolina Union | Bantams | Division I | Region 10 | South Carolina | CJCC |
| Indian Hills Community College | Warriors | Division I | Region 11 | Iowa | ICCAC |
| Iowa Western Community College | Reivers | Division I | Region 11 | Iowa | ICCAC |
| Marshalltown Community College | Tigers | Division I | Region 11 | Iowa | ICCAC |
| Southeastern Community College | Blackhawks | Division I | Region 11 | Iowa | ICCAC |
| Southwestern Community College | Spartans | Division I | Region 11 | Iowa | ICCAC |
| Alvin Community College | Dolphins | Division I | Region 14 | Texas | SJCC |
| Angelina College | Roadrunners | Division I | Region 14 | Texas | SJCC |
| Blinn College | Buccaneers | Division I | Region 14 | Texas | SJCC |
| Bossier Parish Community College | Cavaliers | Division I | Region 14 | Louisiana | SJCC |
| Coastal Bend College | Cougars | Division I | Region 14 | Texas | SJCC |
| Galveston College | Whitecaps | Division I | Region 14 | Texas | SJCC |
| Kilgore College | Rangers | Division I | Region 14 | Texas | SJCC |
| Lamar State College–Port Arthur | Seahawks | Division I | Region 14 | Texas | SJCC |
| Navarro College | Bulldogs | Division I | Region 14 | Texas | SJCC |
| Northeast Texas Community College | Eagles | Division I | Region 14 | Texas | SJCC |
| Paris Junior College | Dragons | Division I | Region 14 | Texas | SJCC |
| San Jacinto College | Coyotes | Division I | Region 14 | Texas | SJCC |
| Trinity Valley Community College | Cardinals | Division I | Region 14 | Texas | SJCC |
| Tyler Junior College | Apaches | Division I | Region 14 | Texas | SJCC |
| Monroe University | Mustangs | Division I | Region 15 | New York | Independent |
| Crowder College | Ladyriders | Division I | Region 16 | Missouri | Independent |
| Jefferson College | Vikings | Division I | Region 16 | Missouri | MCCAC |
| Metropolitan Community College | Wolves | Division I | Region 16 | Missouri | Independent |
| North Central Missouri College | Pirates | Division I | Region 16 | Missouri | Independent |
| State Fair Community College | Roadrunners | Division I | Region 16 | Missouri | MCCAC |
| St. Charles Community College | Cougars | Division I | Region 16 | Missouri | MCCAC |
| Three Rivers College | Raiders | Division I | Region 16 | Missouri | MCCAC |
| Georgia Highlands College | Chargers | Division I | Region 17 | Georgia | GCAA |
| Georgia Military College | Bulldogs | Division I | Region 17 | Georgia | GCAA |
| Gordon State College | Highlanders | Division I | Region 17 | Georgia | GCAA |
| South Georgia State College | Hawks | Division I | Region 17 | Georgia | GCAA |
| Community Christian College | Saints | Division I | Region 18 | California | Scenic West |
| North Idaho College | Cardinals | Division I | Region 18 | Idaho | Scenic West |
| Salt Lake Community College | Bruins | Division I | Region 18 | Utah | Scenic West |
| Snow College | Badgers | Division I | Region 18 | Utah | Scenic West |
| College of Southern Idaho | Golden Eagles | Division I | Region 18 | Idaho | Scenic West |
| Utah State University Eastern | Golden Eagles | Division I | Region 18 | Utah | Scenic West |
| Harford Community College | Fighting Owls | Division I | Region 20 | Maryland | MD JUCO |
| Bevill State Community College | Bears | Division II | Region 22 | Alabama | ACCC |
| Bishop State Community College | Wildcats | Division II | Region 22 | Alabama | ACCC |
| Calhoun Community College | Warhawks | Division I | Region 22 | Alabama | ACCC |
| Central Alabama Community College | Trojans | Division II | Region 22 | Alabama | ACCC |
| Chattahoochee Valley Community College | Pirates | Division I | Region 22 | Alabama | ACCC |
| Coastal Alabama Community College–Bay Minette | Coyotes | Division I | Region 22 | Alabama | ACCC |
| Coastal Alabama Community College Brewton | Warhawks | Division I | Region 22 | Alabama | ACCC |
| Coastal Alabama Community College Monroeville | Coyotes | Division II | Region 22 | Alabama | ACCC |
| Enterprise State Community College | Boil Weevils | Division II | Region 22 | Alabama | ACCC |
| Gadsden State Community College | Cardinals | Division II | Region 22 | Alabama | ACCC |
| Lurleen B. Wallace Community College | Saints | Division II | Region 22 | Alabama | ACCC |
| Marion Military Institute | Tigers | Division II | Region 22 | Alabama | ACCC |
| Northeast Alabama Community College | Mustangs | Division I | Region 22 | Alabama | ACCC |
| Northwest–Shoals Community College | Patriots | Division I | Region 22 | Alabama | ACCC |
| Reid State Community College | Lions | Division I | Region 22 | Alabama | ACCC |
| Shelton State Community College | Buccaneers | Division I | Region 22 | Alabama | ACCC |
| Snead State Community College | Parsons | Division I | Region 22 | Alabama | ACCC |
| Southern Union State Community College | Bison | Division I | Region 22 | Alabama | ACCC |
| Wallace Community College–Dothan | Governors | Division II | Region 22 | Alabama | ACCC |
| Wallace State Community College | Lions | Division I | Region 22 | Alabama | ACCC |
| Baton Rouge Community College | Bears | Division I | Region 23 | Louisiana | LCCAC |
| Frontier Community College | Bobcats | Division I | Region 24 | Illinois | Independent |
| John A. Logan College | Volunteers | Division I | Region 24 | Illinois | Great Rivers Athletic Conference |
| Kaskaskia College | Blue Angels | Division I | Region 24 | Illinois | Great Rivers Athletic Conference |
| Lake Land College | Lakers | Division I | Region 24 | Illinois | Great Rivers Athletic Conference |
| Lincoln Trail College | Lady Statesmen | Division I | Region 24 | Illinois | Great Rivers Athletic Conference |
| Olney Central College | Blue Knights | Division I | Region 24 | Illinois | Great Rivers Athletic Conference |
| Rend Lake College | Warriors | Division I | Region 24 | Illinois | Great Rivers Athletic Conference |
| Shawnee Community College | Saints | Division I | Region 24 | Illinois | Great Rivers Athletic Conference |
| Southeastern Illinois College | Falcons | Division I | Region 24 | Illinois | Great Rivers Athletic Conference |
| Southwestern Illinois College | Blue Storm | Division I | Region 24 | Illinois | Great Rivers Athletic Conference |
| Wabash Valley College | Warriors | Division I | Region 24 | Illinois | Great Rivers Athletic Conference |
| Chandler–Gilbert Community College | Coyotes | Division II | Region 1 | Arizona | ACCAC |
| GateWay Community College | Geckos | Division II | Region 1 | Arizona | ACCAC |
| Glendale Community College | Gauchos | Division II | Region 1 | Arizona | ACCAC |
| Mesa Community College | Thunderbirds | Division II | Region 1 | Arizona | ACCAC |
| Paradise Valley Community College | Pumas | Division II | Region 1 | Arizona | ACCAC |
| Phoenix College | Bears | Division II | Region 1 | Arizona | ACCAC |
| Pima Community College | Aztecs | Division II | Region 1 | Arizona | ACCAC |
| Scottsdale Community College | Fighting Artichokes | Division II | Region 1 | Arizona | ACCAC |
| South Mountain Community College | Cougars | Division II | Region 1 | Arizona | ACCAC |
| University of Arkansas Rich Mountain | Bucks | Division II | Region 2 | Arkansas | Bi-State Conference |
| Arkansas State University Mid-South | Greyhounds | Division II | Region 2 | Arkansas | Bi-State Conference |
| Arkansas State University–Mountain Home | Trailblazers | Division II | Region 2 | Arkansas | Bi-State Conference |
| Arkansas State University-Newport | Aviators | Division II | Region 2 | Arkansas | Bi-State Conference |
| Arkansas State University Three Rivers | Eagles | Division II | Region 2 | Arkansas | Bi-State Conference |
| Carl Albert State College | Vikings | Division II | Region 2 | Oklahoma | Bi-State Conference |
| Murray State College | Aggies | Division II | Region 2 | Oklahoma | Bi-State Conference |
| National Park College | Nighthawks | Division II | Region 2 | Arkansas | Bi-State Conference |
| North Arkansas College | Lady Pioneers | Division II | Region 2 | Arkansas | Bi-State Conference |
| Southern Arkansas University Tech | Rockets | Division II | Region 2 | Arkansas | Bi-State Conference |
| Southeast Arkansas College | Sharks | Division II | Region 2 | Arkansas | Bi-State Conference |
| Black Hawk College | Braves | Division II | Region 4 | Illinois | Arrowhead Conference |
| Bryant & Stratton College–Wisconsin | Bobcats | Division II | Region 4 | Wisconsin | Independent |
| Carl Sandburg College | Chargers | Division II | Region 4 | Illinois | Arrowhead Conference |
| Elgin Community College | Spartans | Division II | Region 4 | Illinois | Illinois Skyway |
| Highland Community College | Cougars | Division II | Region 4 | Illinois | Arrowhead Conference |
| Illinois Valley Community College | Eagles | Division II | Region 4 | Illinois | Arrowhead Conference |
| Kankakee Community College | Cavaliers | Division II | Region 4 | Illinois | Independent |
| Kishwaukee College | Kougars | Division II | Region 4 | Illinois | Arrowhead Conference |
| College of Lake County | Lancers | Division II | Region 4 | Illinois | Illinois Skyway |
| Madison Area Technical College | WolfPack | Division II | Region 4 | Wisconsin | N4C |
| McHenry County College | Scots | Division II | Region 4 | Illinois | Illinois Skyway |
| Moraine Valley Community College | Cyclones | Division II | Region 4 | Illinois | Illinois Skyway |
| Morton College | Panthers | Division II | Region 4 | Illinois | Illinois Skyway |
| Oakton College | Owls | Division II | Region 4 | Illinois | Illinois Skyway |
| Prairie State College | Pioneers | Division II | Region 4 | Illinois | Illinois Skyway |
| Rock Valley College | Golden Eagles | Division II | Region 4 | Illinois | Independent |
| Sauk Valley Community College | Skyhawks | Division II | Region 4 | Illinois | Arrowhead Conference |
| South Suburban College | Bulldogs | Division II | Region 4 | Illinois | Independent |
| Triton College | Trojans | Division II | Region 4 | Illinois | Independent |
| Waubonsee Community College | Chiefs | Division II | Region 4 | Illinois | Illinois Skyway |
| Allen Community College | Red Devils | Division II | Region 6 | Kansas | KJCCC |
| Cloud County Community College | Thunderbirds | Division II | Region 6 | Kansas | KJCCC |
| Coffeyville Community College | Red Ravens | Division II | Region 6 | Kansas | KJCCC |
| Cowley Community College | Tigers | Division II | Region 6 | Kansas | KJCCC |
| Fort Scott Community College | Greyhounds | Division II | Region 6 | Kansas | KJCCC |
| Highland Community College | Scotties | Division II | Region 6 | Kansas | KJCCC |
| Independence Community College | Pirates | Division II | Region 6 | Kansas | KJCCC |
| Johnson County Community College | Cavaliers | Division II | Region 6 | Kansas | KJCCC |
| Kansas City Kansas Community College | Blue Devils | Division II | Region 6 | Kansas | KJCCC |
| Labette Community College | Cardinals | Division II | Region 6 | Kansas | KJCCC |
| Neosho County Community College | Panthers | Division II | Region 6 | Kansas | KJCCC |
| Florida State College at Jacksonville | BlueWave | Division II | Region 8 | Florida | Sun-Lakes |
| Lake–Sumter State College | Lakehawks | Division II | Region 8 | Florida | Sun-Lakes |
| Pasco–Hernando State College | Bobcats | Division II | Region 8 | Florida | Sun-Lakes |
| South Florida State College | Panthers | Division II | Region 8 | Florida | Sun-Lakes |
| St. Johns River State College | Vikings | Division II | Region 8 | Florida | Sun-Lakes |
| Central Community College | Raiders | Division II | Region 9 | Nebraska | NCCAC |
| North Platte Community College | Knights | Division I | Region 9 | Nebraska | NCCAC |
| Southeast Community College | Storm | Division II | Region 9 | Nebraska | NCCAC |
| Brunswick Community College | Dolphins | Division II | Region 10 | North Carolina | CJCC |
| Bryant & Stratton College–Virginia | Bobcats | Division II | Region 10 | Virginia | CJCC |
| Catawba Valley Community College | Red Hawks | Division II | Region 10 | North Carolina | CJCC |
| Cleveland Community College | Yetis | Division II | Region 10 | North Carolina | CJCC |
| Fayetteville Technical Community College | Trojans | Division II | Region 10 | North Carolina | CJCC |
| Louisburg College | Hurricanes | Division II | Region 10 | North Carolina | CJCC |
| Pitt Community College | Bulldogs | Division II | Region 10 | North Carolina | CJCC |
| Richard Bland College | Statesmen | Division II | Region 10 | Virginia | CJCC |
| Southeastern Community College–Whiteville | Rams | Division II | Region 10 | North Carolina | CJCC |
| Southwest Virginia Community College | Flying Eagles | Division II | Region 10 | Virginia | CJCC |
| Wake Technical Community College | Eagles | Division II | Region 10 | North Carolina | CJCC |
| Des Moines Area Community College | Bears | Division II | Region 11 | Iowa | ICCAC |
| Ellsworth Community College | Panthers | Division II | Region 11 | Iowa | ICCAC |
| Hawkeye Community College | RedTails | Division II | Region 11 | Iowa | ICCAC |
| Iowa Central Community College | Tritons | Division II | Region 11 | Iowa | ICCAC |
| Iowa Lakes Community College | Lakers | Division II | Region 11 | Iowa | ICCAC |
| Kirkwood Community College | Eagles | Division II | Region 11 | Iowa | ICCAC |
| Northeast Community College | Hawks | Division II | Region 11 | Nebraska | ICCAC |
| North Iowa Area Community College | Trojans | Division II | Region 11 | Iowa | ICCAC |
| Northeast Iowa Community College | Cougars | Division II | Region 11 | Iowa | ICCAC |
| Alpena Community College | Lumberjacks | Division II | Region 12 | Michigan | MCCAA |
| Bay College | Norse | Division II | Region 12 | Michigan | MCCAA |
| Cuyahoga Community College | Triceratops | Division II | Region 12 | Ohio | OCCAC |
| Edison State Community College | Chargers | Division II | Region 12 | Ohio | OCCAC |
| Glen Oaks Community College | Vikings | Division II | Region 12 | Michigan | MCCAA |
| Grand Rapids Community College | Raiders | Division II | Region 12 | Michigan | MCCAA |
| Henry Ford College | Hawks | Division II | Region 12 | Michigan | MCCAA |
| Hocking College | Hawks | Division II | Region 12 | Ohio | OCCAC |
| Jackson College | Jets | Division II | Region 12 | Michigan | MCCAA |
| Kalamazoo Valley Community College | Cougars | Division II | Region 12 | Michigan | MCCAA |
| Lake Michigan College | Red Hawks | Division II | Region 12 | Michigan | MCCAA |
| Lakeland Community College | Lakers | Division II | Region 12 | Ohio | OCCAC |
| Lansing Community College | Stars | Division II | Region 12 | Michigan | MCCAA |
| Macomb Community College | Monarchs | Division II | Region 12 | Michigan | MCCAA |
| Marian–Ancilla | Chargers | Division II | Region 12 | Indiana | MCCAA |
| Mid Michigan Community College | Lakers | Division II | Region 12 | Michigan | MCCAA |
| Mott Community College | Bears | Division II | Region 12 | Michigan | MCCAA |
| Muskegon Community College | Jayhawks | Division II | Region 12 | Michigan | MCCAA |
| Oakland Community College | Raiders | Division II | Region 12 | Michigan | MCCAA |
| Schoolcraft College | Ocelots | Division II | Region 12 | Michigan | MCCAA |
| St. Clair County Community College | Skippers | Division II | Region 12 | Michigan | MCCAA |
| Bismarck State College | Mystics | Division II | Region 13 | North Dakota | Mon-Dak Conference |
| Dakota County Technical College | Blue Knights | Division II | Region 13 | Minnesota | Independent |
| Dawson Community College | Buccaneers | Division II | Region 13 | Montana | Mon-Dak Conference |
| Lake Region State College | Royals | Division II | Region 13 | North Dakota | Mon-Dak Conference |
| Miles Community College | Pioneers | Division II | Region 13 | Montana | Mon-Dak Conference |
| Williston State College | Tetons | Division II | Region 13 | North Dakota | Mon-Dak Conference |
| SUNY Orange | Colts | Division II | Region 15 | New York | Mid Hudson |
| East Central College | Falcons | Division II | Region 16 | Missouri | MCCAC |
| Mineral Area College | Cardinals | Division II | Region 16 | Missouri | MCCAC |
| Missouri State University–West Plains | Grizzlies | Division I | Region 16 | Missouri | MCCAC |
| Moberly Area Community College | Greyhounds | Division II | Region 16 | Missouri | MCCAC |
| St. Louis Community College | Archers | Division II | Region 16 | Missouri | MCCAC |
| Delaware Technical Community College | Hawks | Division II | Region 19 | Delaware | Independent |
| Lackawanna College | Falcons | Division II | Region 19 | Pennsylvania | Eastern Pennsylvania Athletic Conference |
| Mercer County Community College | Vikings | Division II | Region 19 | New Jersey | GSAC |
| County College of Morris | Titans | Division II | Region 19 | New Jersey | GSAC |
| Raritan Valley Community College | Golden Lions | Division II | Region 19 | New Jersey | GSAC |
| Salem Community College | Oaks | Division II | Region 19 | New Jersey | GSAC |
| Allegany College of Maryland | Trojans | Division II | Region 20 | Maryland | MD JUCO |
| Anne Arundel Community College | Riverhawks | Division II | Region 20 | Maryland | MD JUCO |
| Cecil College | Eagles | Division II | Region 20 | Maryland | MD JUCO |
| Chesapeake College | Skipjacks | Division II | Region 20 | Maryland | MD JUCO |
| CCBC–Catonsville | Cardinals | Division II | Region 20 | Maryland | MD JUCO |
| Frederick Community College | Cougars | Division II | Region 20 | Maryland | MD JUCO |
| Garrett College | Lakers | Division II | Region 20 | Maryland | MD JUCO |
| Hagerstown Community College | Hawks | Division II | Region 20 | Maryland | MD JUCO |
| Howard Community College | Dragons | Division II | Region 20 | Maryland | MD JUCO |
| Montgomery College | Raptors | Division II | Region 20 | Maryland | MD JUCO |
| Potomac State College | Catamounts | Division II | Region 20 | West Virginia | Independent |
| Prince George's Community College | Owls | Division II | Region 20 | Maryland | MD JUCO |
| College of Southern Maryland | Hawks | Division II | Region 20 | Maryland | MD JUCO |
| Coahoma Community College | Tigers | Division II | Region 23 | Mississippi | MACCC |
| Copiah–Lincoln Community College | Wolf Pack | Division II | Region 23 | Mississippi | MACCC |
| East Central Community College | Warriors | Division II | Region 23 | Mississippi | MACCC |
| East Mississippi Community College | Lions | Division II | Region 23 | Mississippi | MACCC |
| Hinds Community College | Eagles | Division II | Region 23 | Mississippi | MACCC |
| Holmes Community College | Bulldogs | Division II | Region 23 | Mississippi | MACCC |
| Itawamba Community College | Indians | Division II | Region 23 | Mississippi | MACCC |
| Jones College | Bobcats | Division II | Region 23 | Mississippi | MACCC |
| Louisiana State University at Eunice | Bengals | Division II | Region 23 | Louisiana | LCCAC |
| Meridian Community College | Eagles | Division II | Region 23 | Mississippi | MACCC |
| Mississippi Delta Community College | Trojans | Division II | Region 23 | Mississippi | MACCC |
| Mississippi Gulf Coast Community College | Bulldogs | Division II | Region 23 | Mississippi | MACCC |
| Northeast Mississippi Community College | Tigers | Division II | Region 23 | Mississippi | MACCC |
| Northwest Mississippi Community College | Rangers | Division II | Region 23 | Mississippi | MACCC |
| Pearl River Community College | Wildcats | Division II | Region 23 | Mississippi | MACCC |
| Southwest Mississippi Community College | Bears | Division II | Region 23 | Mississippi | MACCC |
| Danville Area Community College | Jaguars | Division II | Region 24 | Illinois | Mid-West Athletic |
| Heartland Community College | Hawks | Division II | Region 24 | Illinois | Mid-West Athletic |
| Illinois Central College | Cougars | Division II | Region 24 | Illinois | Mid-West Athletic |
| Lewis and Clark Community College | Trailblazers | Division II | Region 24 | Illinois | Mid-West Athletic |
| Lincoln Land Community College | Loggers | Division II | Region 24 | Illinois | Mid-West Athletic |
| Parkland College | Cobras | Division II | Region 24 | Illinois | Mid-West Athletic |
| Spoon River College | Snappers | Division I | Region 24 | Illinois | Mid-West Athletic |
| Columbia–Greene Community College | Twins | Division III | Region 3 | New York | Mountain Valley Conference |
| Corning Community College | Red Barons | Division III | Region 3 | New York | Mid-State Athletic |
| SUNY Erie | Kats | Division III | Region 3 | New York | Western New York Athletic Conference |
| Finger Lakes Community College | Lakers | Division III | Region 3 | New York | Mid-State Athletic |
| Fulton–Montgomery Community College | Raiders | Division III | Region 3 | New York | Mountain Valley Conference |
| Genesee Community College | Cougars | Division III | Region 3 | New York | Western New York Athletic Conference |
| Herkimer County Community College | Generals | Division III | Region 3 | New York | Mountain Valley Conference |
| Hudson Valley Community College | Vikings | Division III | Region 3 | New York | Mountain Valley Conference |
| Jamestown Community College | Jayhawks | Division III | Region 3 | New York | Western New York Athletic Conference |
| Jefferson Community College | Cannoneers | Division III | Region 3 | New York | Mid-State Athletic |
| Mohawk Valley Community College | Hawks | Division III | Region 3 | New York | Mountain Valley Conference |
| Monroe Community College | Tribunes | Division III | Region 3 | New York | Western New York Athletic Conference |
| Onondaga Community College | Lazers | Division III | Region 3 | New York | Mid-State Athletic |
| SUNY Adirondack | Timberwolves | Division III | Region 3 | New York | Mountain Valley Conference |
| SUNY Broome Community College | Hornets | Division III | Region 3 | New York | Mid-State Athletic |
| SUNY Niagara | Thunderwolves | Division III | Region 3 | New York | Western New York Athletic Conference |
| Tompkins Cortland Community College | Panthers | Division III | Region 3 | New York | Mid-State Athletic |
| College of DuPage | Chaparrals | Division III | Region 4 | Illinois | N4C |
| Harper College | Hawks | Division II | Region 4 | Illinois | N4C |
| Joliet Junior College | Wolves | Division III | Region 4 | Illinois | N4C |
| Caldwell Community College & Technical Institute | Cobras | Division III | Region 10 | North Carolina | CJCC |
| Patrick & Henry Community College | Patriots | Division III | Region 10 | Virginia | CJCC |
| Paul D. Camp Community College | Hurricanes | Division III | Region 10 | Virginia | CJCC |
| Surry Community College | Knights | Division III | Region 10 | North Carolina | CJCC |
| Delta College | Pioneers | Division III | Region 12 | Michigan | MCCAA |
| Owens Community College | Express | Division III | Region 12 | Ohio | OCCAC |
| Terra State Community College | Titans | Division III | Region 12 | Ohio | OCCAC |
| Anoka-Ramsey Community College | Golden Rams | Division III | Region 13 | Minnesota | MCAC |
| Central Lakes College | Raiders | Division III | Region 13 | Minnesota | MCAC |
| Dakota College at Bottineau | Lumberjacks | Division III | Region 13 | North Dakota | Mon-Dak Conference |
| Minnesota North College – Hibbing | Cardinals | Division III | Region 13 | Minnesota | MCAC |
| Minnesota North College – Itasca | Vikings | Division III | Region 13 | Minnesota | MCAC |
| Minnesota North College – Mesabi Range Virginia | Norse | Division III | Region 13 | Minnesota | MCAC |
| Minnesota North College – Rainy River | Voyageurs | Division III | Region 13 | Minnesota | MCAC |
| Minnesota North College – Vermilion | Ironwomen | Division III | Region 13 | Minnesota | MCAC |
| Minnesota State Community and Technical College | Spartans | Division III | Region 13 | Minnesota | MCAC |
| Minnesota West Community and Technical College | Bluejays | Division III | Region 13 | Minnesota | MCAC |
| North Dakota State College of Science | Wildcats | Division III | Region 13 | North Dakota | Mon-Dak Conference |
| Northland Community & Technical College | Pioneers | Division III | Region 13 | Minnesota | MCAC |
| Ridgewater College | Warriors | Division III | Region 13 | Minnesota | MCAC |
| Riverland Community College | Blue Devils | Division III | Region 13 | Minnesota | MCAC |
| Rochester Community and Technical College | Yellowjackets | Division III | Region 13 | Minnesota | MCAC |
| St. Cloud Technical and Community College | Cyclones | Division III | Region 13 | Minnesota | MCAC |
| Dutchess Community College | Falcons | Division III | Region 15 | New York | Mid Hudson |
| Monroe University–Bronx | Express | Division III | Region 15 | New York | Independent |
| Nassau Community College | Lions | Division III | Region 15 | New York | Independent |
| Suffolk County Community College | Sharks | Division III | Region 15 | New York | Independent |
| Bergen Community College | Bulldogs | Division III | Region 19 | New Jersey | GSAC |
| Brookdale Community College | Jersey Blues | Division III | Region 19 | New Jersey | GSAC |
| Camden County College | Lady Cougars | Division III | Region 19 | New Jersey | GSAC |
| Middlesex College | Colts | Division III | Region 19 | New Jersey | GSAC |
| Northampton Community College | Spartans | Division III | Region 19 | Pennsylvania | Eastern Pennsylvania Athletic Conference |
| Ocean County College | Vikings | Division III | Region 19 | New Jersey | GSAC |
| RCSJ–Cumberland | Dukes | Division III | Region 19 | New Jersey | GSAC |
| RCSJ–Gloucester | Roadrunners | Division III | Region 19 | New Jersey | GSAC |
| Sussex County Community College | Skylanders | Division II | Region 19 | New Jersey | GSAC |
| Pennsylvania Highlands Community College | Black Bears | Division III | Region 20 | Pennsylvania | Western Pennsylvania Athletic Conference |
| Community College of Rhode Island | Knights | Division III | Region 21 | Rhode Island | MCCAA |

== 3C2A softball programs ==
| School | Nickname | City | County | Conference |
|---|---|---|---|---|
| American River College | Beavers | Sacramento | Sacramento | Big 8 |
| Cosumnes River College | Hawks | Sacramento | Sacramento | Big 8 |
| Diablo Valley College | Vikings | Pleasant Hill | Contra Costa | Big 8 |
| Folsom Lake College | Falcons | Folsom | Sacramento | Big 8 |
| Modesto Junior College | Pirates | Modesto | Stanislaus | Big 8 |
| Sacramento City College | Panthers | Sacramento | Sacramento | Big 8 |
| San Joaquin Delta College | Mustangs | Stockton | San Joaquin | Big 8 |
| Santa Rosa Junior College | Bear Cubs | Santa Rosa | Sonoma | Big 8 |
| Sierra College | Wolverines | Rocklin | Placer | Big 8 |
| Fresno City College | Rams | Fresno | Fresno | Central Valley |
| Merced College | Lady Devils | Merced | Merced | Central Valley |
| Porterville College | Pirates | Porterville | Tulare | Central Valley |
| Reedley College | Tigers | Reedley | Fresno | Central Valley |
| College of the Sequoias | Giants | Visalia | Tulare | Central Valley |
| Taft College | Cougars | Taft | Kern | Central Valley |
| West Hills College Coalinga | Falcons | Coalinga | Fresno | Central Valley |
| Cabrillo College | Seahawks | Aptos | Santa Cruz | Coast Conference |
| Chabot College | Gladiators | Hayward | Alameda | Coast Conference |
| Hartnell College | Panthers | Salinas | Monterey | Coast Conference |
| Monterey Peninsula College | Lobos | Monterey | Monterey | Coast Conference |
| Ohlone College | Renegades | Fremont | Alameda | Coast Conference |
| San Jose City College | Jaguars | Fruitdale | Santa Clara | Coast Conference |
| College of San Mateo | Bulldogs | San Mateo | San Mateo | Coast Conference |
| West Valley College | Vikings | Saratoga | Santa Clara | Coast Conference |
| Butte College | Roadrunners | Oroville | Butte | Golden Valley Conference |
| Feather River College | Golden Eagles | Quincy | Plumas | Golden Valley Conference |
| Lassen Community College | Cougars | Susanville | Lassen | Golden Valley Conference |
| College of the Redwoods | Corsairs | Eureka | Humboldt | Golden Valley Conference |
| Grossmont College | Griffins | El Cajon | San Diego | Pacific Coast Conference |
| College of the Siskiyous | Eagles | Weed | Siskiyou | Golden Valley Conference |
| Yuba College | 49ers | Marysville | Yuba | Golden Valley |
| Barstow Community College | Vikings | Barstow | San Bernardino | Inland Empire Athletic Conference |
| Chaffey College | Panthers | Rancho Cucamonga | San Bernardino | Inland Empire Athletic Conference |
| College of the Desert | Roadrunners | Palm Desert | Riverside | Inland Empire Athletic Conference |
| Mt. San Jacinto College | Eagles | San Jacinto | Riverside | Inland Empire Athletic Conference |
| San Bernardino Valley College | Wolverines | San Bernardino | San Bernardino | Inland Empire Athletic Conference |
| Victor Valley College | Rams | Victorville | San Bernardino | Inland Empire Athletic Conference |
| Cypress College | Chargers | Cypress | Orange | Orange Empire |
| Fullerton College | Hornets | Fullerton | Orange | Orange Empire |
| Golden West College | Rustlers | Huntington Beach | Orange | Orange Empire |
| Orange Coast College | Pirates | Costa Mesa | Orange | Orange Empire |
| Riverside City College | Tigers | Riverside | Riverside | Orange Empire |
| Saddleback College | Bobcats | Mission Viejo | Orange | Orange Empire |
| Santa Ana College | Dons | Santa Ana | Orange | Orange Empire |
| Santiago Canyon College | Hawks | Orange | Orange | Orange Empire |
| Imperial Valley College | Arabs | Imperial | Imperial | Pacific Coast Athletic |
| Palomar College | Comets | San Marcos | San Diego | Pacific Coast Athletic |
| San Diego City College | Knights | San Diego | San Diego | Pacific Coast Athletic |
| San Diego Mesa College | Olympians | San Diego | San Diego | Pacific Coast Athletic |
| Southwestern College | Jaguars | Chula Vista | San Diego | Pacific Coast Athletic |
| Cerritos College | Falcons | Norwalk | Los Angeles | South Coast |
| Compton College | Tartars | Compton | Los Angeles | South Coast |
| East Los Angeles College | Huskies | Monterey Park | Los Angeles | South Coast |
| El Camino College | Warriors | Alondra Park | Los Angeles | South Coast |
| Long Beach City College | Vikings | Long Beach | Los Angeles | South Coast |
| Los Angeles Harbor College | Seahawks | Wilmington | Los Angeles | South Coast |
| Mt. San Antonio College | Mounties | Walnut | Los Angeles | South Coast |
| Rio Hondo College | Roadrunners | Whittier | Los Angeles | South Coast |
| Allan Hancock College | Bulldogs | Santa Maria | Santa Barbara | Western State |
| Antelope Valley College | Marauders | Lancaster | Los Angeles | Western State |
| Bakersfield College | Renegades | Bakersfield | Kern | Western State |
| College of the Canyons | Cougars | Santa Clarita | Los Angeles | Western State |
| Citrus College | Owls | Glendora | Los Angeles | Western State |
| Cuesta College | Cougars | San Luis Obispo | San Luis Obispo | Western State |
| Glendale Community College | Lady Vaqueros | Glendale | Los Angeles | Western State |
| Los Angeles Mission College | Eagles | Los Angeles | Los Angeles | Western State |
| Los Angeles Valley College | Monarchs | Valley Glen | Los Angeles | Western State |
| Moorpark College | Raiders | Moorpark | Ventura | Western State |
| Oxnard College | Condors | Oxnard | Ventura | Western State |
| Santa Barbara City College | Vaqueros | Santa Barbara | Santa Barbara | Western State |
| Santa Monica College | Corsairs | Santa Monica | Los Angeles | Western State |
| Ventura College | Pirates | Ventura | Ventura | Western State |

== NWAC softball programs ==
| School | Nickname | City | State/Prov. |
|---|---|---|---|
| Bellevue College | Bulldogs | Bellevue | Washington |
| Big Bend Community College | Vikings | Moses Lake | Washington |
| Blue Mountain Community College | Timberwolves | Pendleton | Oregon |
| Centralia College | Trailblazers | Centralia | Washington |
| Chemeketa Community College | Storm | Salem | Oregon |
| Clackamas Community College | Cougars | Oregon City | Oregon |
| Clark College | Penguins | Vancouver | Washington |
| Columbia Basin College | Hawks | Pasco | Washington |
| Douglas College | Royals | New Westminster | British Columbia |
| Edmonds College | Tritons | Lynnwood | Washington |
| Everett Community College | Trojans | Everett | Washington |
| Grays Harbor College | Chokers | Aberdeen | Washington |
| Highline College | Thunderbirds | Des Moines | Washington |
| Lower Columbia College | Red Devils | Longview | Washington |
| Mt. Hood Community College | Saints | Gresham | Oregon |
| Olympic College | Rangers | Bremerton | Washington |
| Pierce College | Raiders | Lakewood | Washington |
| Shoreline Community College | Dolphins | Shoreline | Washington |
| Skagit Valley College | Cardinals | Mount Vernon | Washington |
| Southwestern Oregon Community College | Lakers | Coos Bay | Oregon |
| Community Colleges of Spokane | Sasquatch | Spokane | Washington |
| Treasure Valley Community College | Chukars | Ontario | Oregon |
| Umpqua Community College | Riverhawks | Winchester | Oregon |
| Walla Walla Community College | Warriors | Walla Walla | Washington |
| Wenatchee Valley College | Knights | Wenatchee | Washington |
| Yakima Valley College | Yaks | Yakima | Washington |

== USCAA softball programs ==
| School | Nickname | City | State | Conference |
|---|---|---|---|---|
| Bucks County Community College | Centurions | Newtown | Pennsylvania | Eastern States Athletic Conference |
| Central Maine Community College | Lady Mustangs | Auburn | Maine | Yankee Small College |
| Great Bay Community College | Herons | Portsmouth | New Hampshire | Yankee Small College |
| NHTI – Concord's Community College | Lynx | Concord | New Hampshire | Yankee Small College |
| Southern Maine Community College | SeaWolves | South Portland | Maine | Yankee Small College |

== See also ==
- List of NCAA Division I softball programs
- List of NCAA Division II softball programs
- List of NCAA Division III softball programs
