= Bi-State Conference =

- Association: NJCAA
- Founded: 1970; 56 years ago
- Sports fielded: 8; men's: 4; women's: 4
- Division: Region 2
- No. of teams: 24
- Headquarters: Little Rock, Arkansas
- Region: South Central

Locations
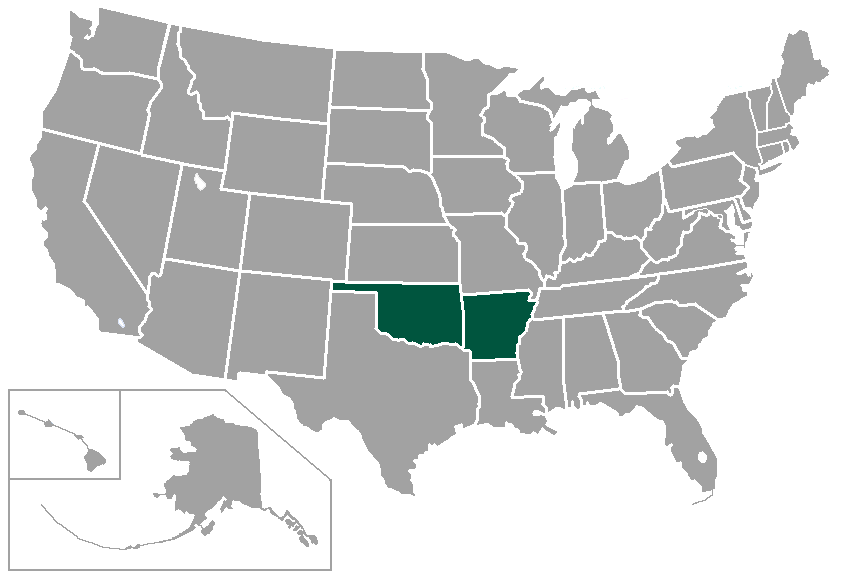

The Bi-State Conference, also known as Region II, is a junior college athletic conference for many technical and community colleges within the South Central states of Arkansas and Oklahoma, sponsored by the National Junior College Athletic Association (NJCAA). Conference championships are held in most sports and individuals can be named to All-Conference and All-Academic teams.

== Member schools ==
=== Current members ===
The Bi-State currently has 24 full members, all but one are public schools:

Institution	Location	Founded	Affiliation	Enrollment	Nickname	Joined	Division
University of Arkansas Cossatot	De Queen, Arkansas	1975	Public (Note: Part of the University of Arkansas System.)	1,600	Colts	?	Arkansas
University of Arkansas Rich Mountain	Mena, Arkansas	1973	Public	1,004	Bucks	?	Arkansas
Arkansas State University Mid-South	West Memphis, Arkansas	1992	Public (Note: Part of the Arkansas State University System.)	?	Greyhounds	?	Arkansas
Arkansas State University Mountain Home	Mountain Home, Arkansas	1995	Public	1,500	Trailblazers	?	Arkansas
Arkansas State University Newport	Newport, Arkansas	1976	Public	2,651	Aviators	2023	Arkansas
Arkansas State University Three Rivers	Malvern, Arkansas	1969	Public	3,500	Eagles	2023	Arkansas
Carl Albert State College	Poteau, Oklahoma	1933	Public (Note: Part of the OSU/A&M Board of Regents.)	2,400	Vikings	?	Oklahoma
Connors State College	Warner, Oklahoma	1908	Public	2,350	Cowboys & Cowgirls	?	Oklahoma
Eastern Oklahoma State College	Wilburton, Oklahoma	1908	Public	1,918	Mountaineers	?	Oklahoma
Murray State College	Tishomingo, Oklahoma	1908	Public	2,200	Aggies	?	Oklahoma
National Park College	Hot Springs, Arkansas	2003	Public	2,768	Nighthawks	?	Arkansas
North Arkansas College	Harrison, Arkansas	1974	Public	?	Pioneers & Lady Pioneers	?	Arkansas
Northeastern Oklahoma A&M College	Miami, Oklahoma	1919	Public	?	Golden Norsemen & Lady Norse	?	Oklahoma
Northern Oklahoma College at Enid	Enid, Oklahoma	1999	Public	?	Jets	?	Oklahoma
Northern Oklahoma College at Tonkawa	Tonkawa, Oklahoma	1901	Public	?	Mavericks	?	Oklahoma
Northwest Arkansas Community College	Bentonville, Arkansas	1989	Public	7,715	Eagles	?	Arkansas
Redlands Community College	El Reno, Oklahoma	1938	Public	?	Cougars	?	Oklahoma
Rose State College (Note: Non-basketball member.)	Midwest City, Oklahoma	1970	Public	13,000	Raiders	?	Oklahoma
Seminole State College	Seminole, Oklahoma	1931	Public	?	Trojans	?	Oklahoma
Shorter College	North Little Rock, Arkansas	1886	Nonsectarian (Note: Also a historically black junior college.)	?	Bulldogs	?	Arkansas
South Arkansas Community College	El Dorado, Arkansas	1992	Public	?	Stars	2019	Arkansas
Southeast Arkansas College	Pine Bluff, Arkansas	1991	Public	1,842	Sharks	2023	Arkansas
Southern Arkansas University Tech	Camden, Arkansas	1967	Public (Note: Part of the Southern Arkansas University System.)	?	Rockets	?	Arkansas
Western Oklahoma State College	Altus, Oklahoma	1926	Public	?	Pioneers	?	Oklahoma

=== Former members ===
Institution	Location	Founded	Affiliation	Enrollment	Nickname	Joined	Left	Division	Current conference
Arkansas Baptist College (Note: Arkansas Baptist transitioned to four-year status and was admitted the National Association of Intercollegiate Athletics (NAIA) in May 2021.)	Little Rock, Arkansas	1884	Baptist (Note: Also a historically black college.)	468	Buffaloes	?	2021	Arkansas	Continental (Note: Currently an NAIA athletic conference.)

== See also ==
- National Junior College Athletic Association
