= Vehicle registration plates of Arkansas =

Arkansas vehicle license plates

Arkansas
Current series
- Slogan: The Natural State
- Size: 12 in × 6 in 30 cm × 15 cm
- Material: Aluminum
- Serial format: ABC 12D (2021-present); 123 ABC (2006-2021)
- Introduced: March 1, 2006

Availability
- Issued by: Arkansas Department of Finance and Administration
- Manufactured by: Waldale Manufacturing Limited, Amherst, Canada

History
- First issued: March 24, 1911

The U.S. state of Arkansas first required its residents to register their motor vehicles and display license plates in 1911. Prior to 1911, plates were issued by cities.

As of 2026, plates are issued by the Arkansas Department of Finance and Administration. Only rear plates have been required since 1944.

== Passenger baseplates ==
=== 1911 to 1967 ===
In 1956, the United States, Canada, and Mexico came to an agreement with the American Association of Motor Vehicle Administrators, the Automobile Manufacturers Association and the National Safety Council that standardized the size for license plates for vehicles (except those for motorcycles) at 6 inches (15 cm) in height by 12 inches (30 cm) in width, with standardized mounting holes. The 1956 (dated 1957) issue was the first Arkansas license plate that fully complied with these standards: the 1947 (dated 1948), 1952 (dated 1953) and 1955 (dated 1956) issues were all 6 inches in height by 12 inches in width, but had non-standard mounting holes.

Image	Dates issued	Design	Slogan	Serial format	Serials issued	Notes
	1911	Black serial on white porcelain plate with border line; vertical "ARK" and "1911" at left and right respectively	none	1234	1 to approximately 1600	
	1912	White serial on black porcelain plate with border line; vertical "ARK" and "1912" at left and right respectively	none	1234	1 to approximately 2500	
	1913	Yellow serial on green porcelain plate; vertical "ARK" and "1913" at left and right respectively	none	1234	1 to approximately 3600	
	1914	Embossed black serial on white plate; vertical "ARK" and "1914" at left and right respectively	none	1234	1 to approximately 5200	The 1914 plate is quite rare, as motorists had to turn in the plate in order to get the 1915 renewal plate.
	1915	Embossed white serial on dark blue plate; vertical "ARK" and "1915" at left and right respectively	none	1234	1 to approximately 8000	
	1916	Embossed black serial on orange plate with border line; vertical "ARK" and "1916" at left and right respectively	none	12345	1 to approximately 15500	
	1917	Embossed yellow serial on black plate with border line; vertical "ARK" and "1917" at left and right respectively	none	12345	1 to approximately 27000	
	1918	Embossed black serial on light green plate with border line; vertical "ARK" and "1918" at left and right respectively	none	12345	1 to approximately 41000	
	1919	Embossed light green serial on black plate with border line; vertical "ARK" and "1919" at left and right respectively	none	12345	1 to approximately 44000	
	1920	Embossed dark blue serial on light blue plate with border line; vertical "ARK" and "1920" at left and right respectively	none	12345	1 to approximately 59000	
	1921	Embossed silver serial on black plate with border line; vertical "ARK" and "1921" at left and right respectively	none	12345	1 to approximately 71000	
	1922	Embossed black serial on yellow plate with border line; vertical "ARK" and "1922" at left and right respectively	none	12-345	1 to approximately 77-000	
	1923	Embossed yellow serial on black plate with border line; vertical "ARK" and "1923" at left and right respectively	none	123-456		
	1924	Embossed dark blue serial on gray plate with border line; "ARK" within state outline and "24" at right	none	123-456		
	1925	Embossed white serial on black plate with border line; "ARK" within state outline and "25" at right	none	123-456		
	1926	Embossed black serial on white plate with border line; "ARK 26" at right	none	123-456		
	1927	Embossed yellow serial on green plate with border line; "ARK 27" at right	none	123-456		
	1928	Embossed orange serial on black plate with border line; vertical "FRONT" or "REAR" used as separator; "ARK 28" at left	none	123-456	1 to approximately 177-000	
	1929	Embossed white serial on dark blue plate with border line; vertical "FRONT" or "REAR" used as separator; "ARK 29" at right	none	123-456	1 to approximately 225-000	
	1930	Embossed yellow serial on dark blue plate with border line; vertical "FRONT" or "REAR" used as separator; "30 ARK" at left	none	123-456	1 to approximately 208-000	
	1931	Embossed white serial on black plate with border line; vertical "FRONT" or "REAR" used as separator; "ARK 31" at right	none	123-456	1 to approximately 189-000	
	1932	Embossed slanted gold serial on black plate with border line; slanted "ARK 32" centered at top	none	123-456	1 to approximately 170-000	
	1933	Embossed green serial on black plate with border line; vertical "ARK" and "1933" at left and right respectively	none	123-456		
	1934	Embossed red serial on white plate with border line; vertical "1934" and "ARK" at left and right respectively	none	123-456	1 to approximately 178-000	
	1935	Embossed dark blue serial on light yellow plate with border line; vertical "ARK" and "1935" at left and right respectively	"CENTENNIAL" and "CELEBRATION 36" centered at top and bottom respectively	123-456	1 to approximately 173-000	Commemorated Arkansas' 100 years of statehood.
	1936	Embossed dark blue serial on white plate with border line; vertical "1936" used as separator; "ARKANSAS" centered at top	none	123-456	1 to approximately 179-000	First use of the full state name.
	1937	Embossed black serial on white plate with border line; vertical "37" used as separator; "ARKANSAS" centered at top	none	123-456	1 to approximately 183-000	
	1938	Embossed white serial on red plate with border line; "ARKANSAS" within winged graphic centered at bottom; "38" within state outline at left	none	123-456	1 to approximately 177-000	
	1939	Embossed black serial on silver plate with border line; vertical "39" used as separator; "ARKANSAS" centered at top	none	123-456	1 to approximately 187-000	
	1940	Embossed red serial on silver plate with border line; "ARK 1940" and "EXPIRES 12-31-40" centered at top and bottom respectively	none	123-456	1 to 200-000; 300-001 to approximately 301-000	
	1941	Embossed green serial on silver plate with border line; vertical "41" used as separator; "ARKANSAS" centered at top	"OPPORTUNITY LAND" centered at bottom	123-456	1 to 200-000; 300-001 to approximately 334-000	
	1942–43	Embossed orange serial on black plate with border line; "1942" and "ARKANSAS" centered at top and bottom respectively	none	123-456	1 to 200-000; 300-001 to approximately 390-000	Revalidated for 1943 with windshield stickers, due to metal conservation for World War II.
	1944	White serial on black fiberboard plate; "19 ARK. 44" centered at top	none	123-456	1 to approximately 224-000	Manufactured on fiberboard due to ongoing metal conservation for World War II.
	1945	Embossed golden yellow serial on black plate with border line; "19 ARK. 45" centered at top	none	123-456	1 to approximately 218-000	
	1946	Embossed black serial on white plate with border line; "19 ARK. 46" centered at top	none	123-456	1 to approximately 222-000	
	1947	Embossed red serial on unpainted aluminum plate with border line; "19 ARKANSAS 47" at top	none	123-456	1 to approximately 245-000	
	1948–49	Embossed black serial on unpainted aluminum plate with border line; "ARKANSAS 1948" centered at top	"OPPORTUNITY LAND" centered at bottom	123-456	1 to approximately 345-000	Revalidated for 1949 with aluminum tabs.
	1950	Embossed white serial on dark green plate with border line; "ARKANSAS 1950" centered at top	"LAND OF OPPORTUNITY" at bottom	123-456	1 to approximately 374-000	
	1951	Embossed dark green serial on white plate with border line; "ARKANSAS 1951" centered at top	"LAND OF OPPORTUNITY" at bottom	123-456	1 to approximately 375-000	
	1952	Embossed white serial on brown plate with border line; "ARKANSAS 1952" centered at top	"LAND OF OPPORTUNITY" at bottom	123-456	1 to approximately 380-000	
	1953	Embossed blue serial on white plate with border line; "ARKANSAS 1953" centered at top	"LAND OF OPPORTUNITY" at bottom	123-456	1 to approximately 394-000	
	1954	Embossed white serial on dark green plate with border line; "ARKANSAS 1954" centered at top	"LAND OF OPPORTUNITY" at bottom	123-456	1 to approximately 393-000	
	1955	Embossed white serial on dark blue plate with border line; "ARKANSAS 1955" centered at top	"LAND OF OPPORTUNITY" at bottom	123-456	1 to approximately 399-000	
	1956	Embossed black serial on pale green plate with border line; "ARKANSAS 1956" centered at top	"LAND OF OPPORTUNITY" at bottom	123-456	1 to approximately 422-000	
	1957	Embossed red serial on white plate with border line; "ARKANSAS 1957" centered at top	"LAND OF OPPORTUNITY" at bottom	1-12345; 10-1234	Coded by county of issuance (1 or 10)	
	1958	Embossed white serial on dark blue plate with border line; "ARKANSAS 58" centered at top	"LAND OF OPPORTUNITY" at bottom	1-12345; 10-12345	Coded by county of issuance (1 or 10)	
	1959	Embossed black serial on white plate with border line; "ARKANSAS 59" centered at top	"LAND OF OPPORTUNITY" at bottom	1-12345; 10-12345	Coded by county of issuance (1 or 10)	
	1960	Embossed white serial on dark blue plate with border line; "ARKANSAS 60" centered at top	"LAND OF OPPORTUNITY" at bottom	1-12345; 10-12345	Coded by county of issuance (1 or 10)	
	1961	Embossed red serial on gray plate with border line; "ARKANSAS 61" centered at top	"LAND OF OPPORTUNITY" at bottom	1-12345; 10-12345	Coded by county of issuance (1 or 10)	
	1962	Embossed blue serial on white plate with border line; "ARKANSAS 62" centered at top	"LAND OF OPPORTUNITY" at bottom	1-12345; 10-12345	Coded by county of issuance (1 or 10)	
	1963	Embossed white serial on dark blue plate with border line; "ARKANSAS 63" centered at top	"LAND OF OPPORTUNITY" at bottom	1-123456; 10-12345	Coded by county of issuance (1 or 10)	
	1964	Embossed red serial on white plate with border line; "ARKANSAS 64" centered at top	"LAND OF OPPORTUNITY" at bottom	1-123456; 10-12345	Coded by county of issuance (1 or 10)	
	1965	Embossed blue serial on white plate with border line; "ARKANSAS 65" centered at top	"LAND OF OPPORTUNITY" at bottom	1-123456; 10-12345	Coded by county of issuance (1 or 10)	
	1966	Embossed red serial on reflective white plate with border line; "ARKANSAS 66" centered at top	"LAND OF OPPORTUNITY" at bottom	1-123456; 10-12345	Coded by county of issuance (1 or 10)	
	1967	Embossed blue serial on reflective white plate with border line; "ARKANSAS 67" centered at top	"LAND OF OPPORTUNITY" at bottom	1-123456; 10-12345	Coded by county of issuance (1 or 10)	

=== 1968 to present ===
Image	Dates issued	Design	Slogan	Serial format	Serials issued	Notes
	1968–74	Embossed red serial on reflective white plate with border line; "ARKANSAS" centered at top	none	ABC 123	AAA 001 to EEW 999	Letter Q not used in serials, and U and V not used from 1973 onwards.
	1975–77	Embossed red serial on reflective white plate with border line; "ARKANSAS" centered at top	"LAND OF OPPORTUNITY" at bottom	ABC 123	EEX 001 to GEC 999	Letter Q not used in serials, and U and V not used from 1973 onwards.
	1978–88	Embossed red serial on reflective white plate; "Arkansas" screened in blue centered at top	"Land of Opportunity" screened in blue centered at bottom	ABC 123	GED 001 to POP 999	
	1989 – May; 1996	Embossed blue serial on reflective white plate; red band screened at top containing "Arkansas" in white in the center	"The Natural State" screened in red centered at bottom	ABC 123	POR 001 to ZZZ 999	
	May; 1996 – February 2006	Embossed red serial on reflective white plate; "Arkansas" screened in dark blue centered at top	"The Natural State" screened in dark blue centered at bottom	123 ABC	001 AAA to 999 KPF	
	March 2006 – April; 2021	Embossed black serial on reflective gradient sky blue and white plate; diamond graphic screened in the center; "Arkansas" screened in dark red centered at top	"The Natural State" screened in dark red centered at bottom	123 ABC	001 KPG to 999 ZZZ	Letters U and V added back to serials in 2015.
	April 2021 – present	Embossed black serial on reflective gradient sky blue and white plate; diamond graphic screened in the center; "Arkansas" screened in dark red centered at top	"The Natural State" screened in dark red centered at bottom	ABC 12D	AAA 01A to BJA 95D (as of October 31, 2025)	Letters U and V added back to serials in 2015.

== Non-passenger plates ==
Image	Type	Dates issued	Design	Serial format	Serials issued	Notes
	Amateur radio	2006–present	As passenger base, but with "AMATEUR RADIO" in place of slogan	FCC call sign	various	
	Ambulance	2006–present	As passenger base, with "AMBULANCE" sticker placed over slogan	123 ABC; ABC 12D	Taken from passenger allocation	
	Antique motorcycle	? to present	Black on white background; "ARK. M CYCLE" at top and "ANTIQUE" at bottom	123A		
	Antique vehicle	1957 to 2007	Black on white background; antique car graphic at left	12345	? to 99999	No longer issued, but still valid.
	Antique vehicle	2007–present	Black on white background; antique car graphic at left	A1234	A0001 to present	
	Apportioned truck	? to present	All-embossed black on yellow	C 123456		
	Border cities taxi cab	? to present	Red on white background; "Border City" at bottom	123 ABC		
	Church bus	2006–present	As passenger base, with "CHURCH BUS" sticker placed over slogan	123 ABC; ABC 12D	Taken from passenger allocation	This plate appears to be the same as "Not For Hire," but the AR DFA lists them separately.
	Dealer—Motorcycle	Annual plates	2004: All-embossed black on light blue	1234 M		
	Disabled	? to present	Blue on reflective white with blue graphics and wheelchair graphic at left	123456		Officially called "Persons With Disabilities" license plate by the AR DFA.
	Disabled Motorcycle	? to present	Blue on reflective white; "ARK. M CYCLE" at top and wheelchair graphic at left	D/M 123	D/M 001 to present	Officially called "Persons With Disabilities" license plate by the AR DFA.
	Farm to Market Bus	? to present	Red on white background; "F-M Bus" at bottom	ABC 123		
	Hearse	? to present	Red on white background; "Funeral Coach" at bottom	ABC 123	? to present	Used for both hearses and funeral cars.
	Motorcycle	1979–81	Embossed red serial on white plate; "ARK. M CYCLE" at top and "EXP. 6" at bottom left	AB 12	AA 01 to ZZ 99	All motorcycle plates expired on June 30 until 1994, when staggered registration was introduced.
	Motorcycle	1981–85	Embossed red serial on white plate; "ARK. M CYCLE" at top and "EXP. 6" at bottom left	12 AB	01 AA to 99 ZZ	All motorcycle plates expired on June 30 until 1994, when staggered registration was introduced.
	Motorcycle	1985–94	Embossed red serial on white plate; "ARK. M CYCLE" at top and "EXP. 6" at bottom left	AB 123	AA 001 to FZ 999	All motorcycle plates expired on June 30 until 1994, when staggered registration was introduced.
	Motorcycle	1994–2015	As above, but without "EXP. 6"	AB 123	GA 001 to ZZ 999	All motorcycle plates expired on June 30 until 1994, when staggered registration was introduced.
	Motorcycle	2015–present	As above, but without "EXP. 6"	123 AB	001 AA to 537 EF (as of October 25, 2021)	All motorcycle plates expired on June 30 until 1994, when staggered registration was introduced.
	Not For Hire Bus	? to present	Red on white background; "Not For Hire" at bottom	123 ABC		This plate appears to be the same as "Church Bus," but the AR DFA lists them separately.
	Permanent Trailer	? to present	All-embossed black on white	A/B123456	A/A000 001 to A/B649830 (As of May 29, 2021)	Used on trailers hauled by automobiles and class 1 trucks
	Permanent Trailer	? to present	All-embossed black on white	S/P123 456	S/P000 001 to S/P000 923 (As of November 29, 2022)	Unknown classification of permanent trailer plate
	Permanent Trailer	? to present	All-embossed blue on tan	PT12 345; PT123456	PT00 001? to PT210303 (As of April 28, 2022)	Used on trailers hauled by class 2 through 8 trucks
	School Vehicle	2006–present	As passenger base, with "SCHOOL VEHICLE" sticker placed over slogan	123 ABC; ABC 12D	Taken from passenger allocation	
	Street Rod Custom Vehicle	? to present	Red on white background; street rod graphic at left	S/R 1234	S/R 0001 to ?	
	Transporter	? to present	All-embossed black on light blue	T/P12345		

== Optional plates ==
=== College and university plates ===
Image	Type	Dates issued	Design	Serial format	Serials issued	Notes
	Arkansas School for the Deaf	? to present	Red on blue fade to white background with ASL "I Love You" sign at left.	A/D 1234	? to present	
	Arkansas State University	? to present	Red on reflective white with ASU graphic at left.	2ABC	2AAA to present	Issued concurrently.
	Arkansas State University	? to present	Red on reflective white with red wolf graphic at left.	2ABC	? to present	Issued concurrently.
	Arkansas Tech University	2006–present	Green on reflective yellow.	10ABC	10AAA to present	The image at the Arkansas DFA website shows "Technical" instead of "Tech."
	College of the Ouachitas	? to present	Black on multicolor background with COTO logo at left.	O/C 1234	? to present	As of 2016 only 18 of these plates had been issued.
	Harding University	c. 2009 to present	Black on reflective white with multicolored graphic at left.	15ABC	15AAA to present	
	Henderson State University	? to present	Black on reflective white with multicolored graphic at left.	7ABC	7AAA to present	
	Hendrix College	? to present	Black on reflective white with multicolored graphic at left.	11ABC	11AAA to present	
	Lyon College	c. 2008 to present	Black on reflective white with multicolored graphic at left.	13ABC	13AAA to present	
	Mid-South Community College	? to present	Black on reflective white with multicolored graphic at left.	M/C ABCD	? to present	As of 2016 only 18 of these plates had been issued. This college was renamed Arkansas State University Mid-South as of July 1, 2015.
	National Park Community College	? to present	Black on reflective blue to white fade background and multicolored graphic at left.	N/P ABCD	? to present	As of 2016 only 12 of these plates had been issued, which was the fewest of any of the colleges or universities.
	Northwest Arkansas Community College	? to present	Black on reflective white and green and multicolored graphic at left.	N/W ABCD	? to present	As of 2016 only 50 of these plates had been issued.
	Ouachita Baptist University	? to present	Black on reflective yellow fade background.	8ABC	8AAA to present	
	Ouachita Baptist University	? to present	Black on reflective white background.	8ABC	8AAA to present	
	Southern Arkansas University	? to present	Black on reflective white with multicolored graphic at left.	5ABC	5AAA to present	
	Southern Arkansas University	? to present	Black on reflective white with multicolored graphic at left.	S/A ABCD	S/A AAAA to present	
	University of Arkansas at Fayetteville	? to ?	Red on reflective white with multicolored graphic at left.	1ABC	1AAA to ?	No longer issued, but still valid.
	University of Arkansas at Fayetteville	? to present	Red on reflective white with multicolored graphic at left.	U/A ABC	U/A AAA to present	As of September 2017 all three plate types are still shown on the Arkansas DFA website with the later two still being issued.
	University of Arkansas at Fayetteville	? to present	Red on reflective white with multicolored graphic at left.	Y/A 12A	Y/A 01A to present	As of September 2017 all three plate types are still shown on the Arkansas DFA website with the later two still being issued.
	University of Arkansas at Fort Smith	? to present	Black on blue and white striped background and UAFS logo at right.	F/S ABCD	? to present	
	University of Arkansas at Little Rock	? to present	Red on reflective white with multicolored graphic at left.	4ABC	4AAA to present	
	University of Arkansas at Monticello	? to present	Black on multicolored background.	9ABC	9AAA to present	
	University of Arkansas at Pine Bluff	? to present	Black on multicolored background.	6ABC	6AAA to present	
	University of Arkansas for Medical Sciences	? to present	Black on multicolored background with UAMS logo right.	M/S ABCD	? to present	
	University of Central Arkansas	? to present	Blue on reflective white with white and red UCA graphic.	3ABC	3AAA to present	
	University of Central Arkansas	? to present	Black on reflective white with purple and white graphic.	3ABC	3AAA to present	
	University of the Ozarks	c. 2008 to present	Black on reflective multicolored graphic.	12ABC	12AAA to present	

=== Military and veteran plates ===
Image	Type	Dates issued	Design	Serial format	Serials issued	Notes
	Cold War Veteran	2006–present	As passenger base, with "COLD WAR VETERAN" sticker placed over slogan	123 ABC; ABC 12D	Taken from passenger allocation	
	Congressional Medal of Honor	? to present	Red on reflective white with multicolored graphic of award and award ribbon.	MH12	?	
	Disabled Veteran	? to present	Red on reflective white	DV12345	? to present	
	Disabled Veteran - Free	? to present	Red on reflective white	DAV1234	? to present	
	Distinguished Flying Cross	? to present	Red on reflective white; DFC graphic screened at right; "Arkansas" screened in blue at top	A12DFC	A01DFC to present	
	Ex-Prisoner of War	? to present	Blue on reflective white	POW 123	?	
	Gold Star Family	? to present	Red on reflective white with purple and gold star and wreath	G/S 1234	?	
	Korean War Veteran	2006–present	As passenger base, with "KOREAN WAR VETERAN" sticker placed over slogan	123 ABC; ABC 12D	Taken from passenger allocation	
	Little Rock Air Force Base	? to present	Black on multicolored sky background and LRAFB logo at left	R/R 1234	?	
	National Guard	?	Black on multicolored flag background with "National Guard" in yellow.	12345	?	
	National Guard - Minuteman	?	Red on reflective white with National Guard Minuteman at left.	123456	? to present	
	Operation Enduring Freedom Veteran	2006–present	As passenger base, with "OPERATION ENDURING FREEDOM VETERAN" sticker placed over slogan	123 ABC; ABC 12D	Taken from passenger allocation	First issued 2005 on general Veteran design (below).
	Operation Iraqi Freedom Veteran	2006–present	As passenger base, with "OPERATION IRAQI FREEDOM VETERAN" sticker placed over slogan	123 ABC; ABC 12D	Taken from passenger allocation	First issued 2005 on general Veteran design.
	Pearl Harbor Survivor	?	Red on reflective white with Pearl Harbor Survivor graphic at left.	PHS 123	?	
	Persian Gulf Veteran	2006–present	As passenger base, with "PERSIAN GULF VETERAN" sticker placed over slogan	123 ABC; ABC 12D	Taken from passenger allocation	
	Purple Heart	? to present	Red on reflective white with multicolored graphic of award.	PH1234	? to present	Earlier plates were issued in a format of PH 1234, without a graphic of the award.
	Purple Heart Motorcycle	? to present	Red on reflective white with "Purple Heart" wording at bottom.	12 AB	? to present	
	Support Our Troops	2006–present	As passenger base, with "Support Our Troops!" sticker placed over slogan	123 ABC; ABC 12D	Taken from passenger allocation	
	Retired U.S. Veteran - U.S. Merchant Marine	? to present	Blue on reflective white	ABC 123	? to present	
	U.S. Armed Forces Retired	? to present	Red on reflective white	123456	? to present	
	U.S. Armed Forces Reserve	? to present	Red on reflective white	12345	? to present	
	Veteran	obsolete	Embossed red on reflective white; "Arkansas" screened in blue at top; campaign name sticker at bottom; sticker at left for corresponding branch of service, medal, or major award	U/S ABCDE	U/S AAAAA to approximately U/S AIAZZ	Issued to veterans of World War II, the Korean, Vietnam and Persian Gulf Wars, and Operations Iraqi Freedom and Enduring Freedom. Discontinued in favour of regular passenger plates with campaign name sticker placed over the "Natural State" slogan, but still valid.
	Veterans of Foreign Wars	? to present	Embossed black on reflective blue, white and red gradient; VFW logo screened at left; "Arkansas" screened in black at top	N/B ABCD	N/B AAAA to present	Proceeds partially support the Nick Bacon Memorial Scholarship Fund (NBMS).
	Vietnam Veteran	2006–present	As passenger base, with "VIETNAM VETERAN" sticker placed over slogan	123 ABC; ABC 12D	Taken from passenger allocation	
	World War II Veteran	2006–present	As passenger base, with "WORLD WAR II VETERAN" sticker placed over slogan	123 ABC; ABC 12D	Taken from passenger allocation	

=== Organization and specialty plates ===
Beginning in 2000, the Arkansas Game and Fish Commission has released one wildlife-themed plate design each year, to be issued for one calendar year, although remaining stock is sometimes issued past the end of a particular plate design's year of release. Note that some plates that were originally issued without prefixes now have them, and that prefixes now include G/F, G/G and G/H.

Image	Type	Dates issued	Design	Serial format	Serials issued	Notes
	Arkansas Rice Council	? to present	Black on reflective blue and white sky background with rice plant graphic and duck.	R/C ABCD	R/C AAAA to present	
	Arkansas Sheriffs' Association	? to present	Black on reflective white background with association logo at left.	A/S ABCD	A/S AAAA to present	
	Arkansas State Parks	March 2012 – present	Golden yellow on multicolored graphic with Mather Lodge at Petit Jean State Park.	P/K ABCD	P/K AAAA to present	
	Arkansas State Parks	? to present	Black on white background with multicolored graphic of hikers graphic at left.	P/K ABCD	P/K AAAA to present	
	Autism Awareness	? to present	Black on blue to white fade background with autism puzzle pieces inside state outline.	A/U ABCD	A/U AAAA to present	
	Boy Scout, Girl Scout, and Orphanages	? to present	Red on white background with "BS & O" at bottom.	ABC 123	?	The AR DFA states that these plates are for any Boy Scouts, Girl Scouts, Orphanages, or Boy or Girl Clubs which are a member of or affiliated with Boys or Girls Clubs of America.
	Boy Scouts of America	? to present	Green on tan background with Boy Scout logo on red, white and blue stripes at right.	B/P ABCD	B/P AAAA to present	
	Buffalo River	? to present	Black on multicolored background.	B/R ABCD	B/R AAAA to present	
	Cattlemen Foundation	? to present	Red on reflective white with multicolored graphic at left.	C/F ABCD	C/F AAAA to present	
	Civil Air Patrol	? to present	Red on reflective white with Civil Air Patrol logo at left.	CA 123	CA 001 to present	
	Court Appointed Special Advocates	2015–present	Black on reflective blue to white fade with multicolored CASA graphic at left.	C/A ABCD	C/A AAAA to present	
	Choose Life	? to present	Black on reflective yellow with blue and red graphics.	C/L ABCD	C/L AAAA to present	
	Committed to Education	? to present	Black on white reflective background with books, apple and worm at left.	ABCD	AAAA to present	
	Committed to Education	? to present	Bright blue on light blue reflective background with "A+" inside state shape at right.	ABCD	AAAA to present	
	Department of Conservation Districts	? to present	Black on reflective white background with landscape graphic at left and "For Love of the Land" at bottom.	C/D ABCD	C/D AAAA to present	
	Down Syndrome Awareness	? to present	As passenger base, with "Down Syndrome Awareness" sticker placed over slogan	123 ABC; ABC 12D	Taken from passenger allocation	
	Dr. Martin Luther King, Jr.	? to present	Black on reflective white with graphic of Dr. King at left.	M/K ABCD	M/K AAAA to present	
	Dr. Martin Luther King, Jr. Commission	? to present	As passenger base, with sticker featuring Dr. King, "LIVE THE DREAM" and "MAKE CHANGE HAPPEN" placed over slogan	123 ABC; ABC 12D	Taken from passenger allocation	
	Ducks Unlimited	? to present	Black on multicolored background and Ducks Unlimited shield at left.	1ABCD	1AAAA to present	No longer issued, but still valid.
	Ducks Unlimited	? to present	Black on multicolored background and flying duck at left.	1ABCD	1AAAA to present	
	Ducks Unlimited	? to present	Black on multicolored background and standing duck at right.	1ABCD	1AAAA to present	
	Emergency Medical Services	? to present	Red on reflective white with multicolored graphic at left.	E/M ABCD	E/M AAAA to present	
	Firefighter	? to present	Blue on reflective white with logo and legends displayed on stickers.	AB123	?	
	Firefighters' Memorial	? to present	Black on multicolored fire background.	F/F ABCD	F/F AAAA to present	
	Freemason	2006–present	As passenger base, with "FREEMASON" sticker placed over slogan	123 ABC; ABC 12D	Taken from passenger allocation	
	Golf Association	? to present	Red on reflective white with green graphic at right.	G/A ABC	G/A AAA to present	
	Hospice & Palliative Care Association	? to present	Black on reflective white with Hospice & Palliative Care Association logo at left.	H/P ABCD	H/P AAAA to present	
	Humane Society of the Ozarks	? to present	Red on white background with "Get Rescued" and "Adopt A Pet" at bottom.	123 ABC	?	
	In God We Trust	? to present	Black on light blue with multicolored image of Arkansas State Capitol.	A/R ABCD	A/R AAAA to present	
	Justice of the Peace	? to present	Blue on white background with "Justice of the Peace" at bottom.	ABC 123	?	
	Kappa Alpha Psi Fraternity	? to present	Black on orange to white fade background with fraternity crest at left.	I/U ABCD	I/U AAAA to present	
	Municipal Police Association	? to present	Black on white background with black and blue state outline and background at left.	L/O ABCD	L/O AAAA to present	
	National Multiple Sclerosis Society	? to present	As passenger base, with NMSS sticker placed over slogan	123 ABC; ABC 12D	Taken from passenger allocation	
	National Wild Turkey Federation	? to present	Black on multicolored background and wild turkey graphic at left	B/L ABCD	B/L AAAA to present	
	Omega Psi Phi Fraternity	? to present	Black on purple to white fade background with fraternity crest at left.	A/O ABCD	A/O AAAA to present	
	Organ Donor Awareness	? to present	Black on white background with green ribbon and red heart at left.	O/D ABCD	O/D AAAA to present	
	Phi Beta Sigma Fraternity	? to present	Blue on white background with fraternity seal at right.	H/U ABCD	H/U AAAA to present	
	Professional Firefighter	April 2008 – present	Black on reflective red to white fade background with logo of Arkansas Professional Fire Fighters Association	P/F ABCD	P/F AAAA to present	
	Realtor	? to present	Blue on reflective white with Realtor logo at right	R/A ABC	R/A AAA to present	
	Search and Rescue	? to present	Red on reflective white with SAR logo at left.	SA 123	SA 001 to present	
	Sheep Dog Impact Assistance	? to present	As passenger base, with "SHEEP DOG IMPACT ASSISTANCE" sticker placed over slogan	123 ABC; ABC 12D	Taken from passenger allocation	
	Wildlife — American Black Bear	2008	Black on multicolored background.	12AB		
	Wildlife — Bald eagle	2013	Black on multicolored background.	G/F ABC	G/F AAA to present	
	Wildlife — Black crappie	2012	Black on multicolored background.	G/F ABC	G/F AAA to present	
	Wildlife — Black Labrador	2010	Black on multicolored background.	G/F ABC	G/F AAA to present	
	Wildlife — Diana fritillary butterfly	2009	Black on multicolored background.	G/F ABC	G/F AAA to present	
	Wildlife — Eastern Wild Turkey	2003	Black on multicolored background.	AB12	AA01 to ?	
	Wildlife — Elk	2007	Black on multicolored background.	12AB	01AA to ?	
	Wildlife — Ivory-Billed Woodpecker	2006	Black on multicolored background.	12AB	01AA to ?	
	Wildlife — Largemouth Bass	2002	Black on multicolored background.	AB12	AA01 to ?	
	Wildlife — Mallard	2004	Black on multicolored background.	AB12	AA01 to ?	
	Wildlife — Northern Cardinal	2016	Black on multicolored background.	AB12	AA01 to ?	
	Wildlife — Rainbow Trout	2005	Black on multicolored background.	AB12	?	
	Wildlife — Red Fox	2017	Black on multicolored background.	G/F AB12	G/F AA01 to present	
	Wildlife — Ruby-Throated Hummingbird	2001	Black on light blue with multicolored image of hummingbird and flower.	AB12; 12AB; G/F ABC	?	Awarded "Plate of the Year" for best new license plate of 2001 by the Automobile License Plate Collectors Association, the first and, to date, only time Arkansas has been so honored.
	Wildlife — Smallmouth Bass	2015	Black on multicolored background.	G/F AB12	G/F AA01 to present	
	Wildlife — Squirrel	2014	Black on multicolored background.	G/F AB12	G/F AA01 to present	
	Wildlife — White-Tailed Deer	2000	Black on multicolored background.	AB12	AA01 to ?	Possibly no longer available, but is still shown on the AR DFA website.
	Wildlife — White-Tailed Deer	2011	Black on multicolored background.	G/F AB12	G/F AA01 to present	
