= Salem, Arkansas =

Salem is the name of several places in the U.S. state of Arkansas:

- Salem, Fulton County, Arkansas, a city in northern Arkansas
- Salem, Ouachita County, Arkansas
- Salem, Pike County, Arkansas
- Salem, Saline County, Arkansas, a census-designated place in central Arkansas
- Witcherville, Arkansas, Sebastian County, formerly Salem
