= Arkansas State University System =

State university system in Little Rock, Arkansas, U.S.

- Type: Public
- Established: 1909; 117 years ago
- Endowment: $195 million (2025)
- President: Dr. Todd Shields
- Undergraduates: 41,591
- Location: Little Rock, Arkansas, U.S.
- Website: www.asusystem.edu

The Arkansas State University System is a public university system in Little Rock, Arkansas, United States. It serves almost 40,000 students annually on campuses in Arkansas and Queretaro, Mexico, and globally online.

The Arkansas State University System includes Arkansas State University (A-State), a four-year research institution in Jonesboro with Campus Queretaro in Mexico, and four-year research institution, Henderson State University in Arkadelphia, as well as five independently accredited and functionally separate two-year institutions: ASU-Beebe, with additional campuses in Heber Springs and Searcy and an instructional site at Little Rock Air Force Base; ASU-Newport, with additional campuses in Jonesboro and Marked Tree; ASU-Mountain Home; ASU Mid-South in West Memphis; ASU Three Rivers (formerly College of the Ouachitas) in Malvern. Act 18 of 2021 added Henderson State University, a four-year institution in Arkadelphia, to the ASU System and expanded the ASU System Board of Trustees to seven members.

Dr. Todd Shields became the fourth president of the ASU System on July 1, 2026. following the resignation of Dr. Brendan Kelly on Dec. 12, 2025. The chancellors are Dr. Calvin White Jr. at Arkansas State, Dr. Jennifer Methvin at ASU-Beebe, Ike Wheeler at ASU-Newport, Dr. Bentley Wallace at ASU-Mountain Home, Dr. Debra West at ASU Mid-South, Shane Broadway (interim) at ASU Three Rivers, and Dr. Trey Berry at Henderson State. A seven-member Board of Trustees appointed by the governor governs the system.

The ASU System provides a wide range of degree and certificate programs, serves as a leading voice on state higher education issues, and supports significant programs for the state and region, including economic development initiatives, the Arkansas Biosciences Institute, and Arkansas heritage sites.

The mission of the ASU System is to contribute to the educational, cultural, and economic advancement of Arkansas by providing quality general undergraduate education and specialized programs leading to certificate, associate, baccalaureate, master's, professional, and doctoral degrees; by encouraging the pursuit of research, scholarly inquiry, and creative activity; and by bringing these intellectual resources together to develop the economy of the state and the education of its citizens throughout their lives.

The Arkansas Higher Education Coordinating Board has approved Arkansas State University's plan to launch a College of Veterinary Medicine in Jonesboro, and the university will now proceed with the national accrediting agencies associated with veterinary colleges.

== Campuses ==
- Arkansas State University, Jonesboro (primary campus)
  - Arkansas State University Campus Queretaro, Queretaro, Mexico
- Arkansas State University-Beebe, Beebe, Arkansas
  - Arkansas State University-Beebe Searcy Campus, Searcy, Arkansas
  - Arkansas State University-Beebe Heber Springs Campus, Heber Springs, Arkansas
  - Arkansas State University-Beebe at Little Rock Air Force Base, Jacksonville, Arkansas
- Arkansas State University-Newport, Newport, Arkansas
  - Arkansas State University-Newport Marked Tree Campus, Marked Tree, Arkansas
  - Arkansas State University-Newport Jonesboro Campus, Jonesboro, Arkansas
- Arkansas State University-Mountain Home, Mountain Home, Arkansas
- Arkansas State University Mid-South, West Memphis, Arkansas
- Arkansas State University Three Rivers, Malvern, Arkansas
- Henderson State University, Arkadelphia, Arkansas

=== Athletics ===
Some institutions sponsors athletic programs. Arkansas State University is a member of the Sun Belt Conference of the NCAA Division I. Henderson State University is member of the GAC of the NCAA Division II. While Arkansas State University Mid-South, Arkansas State University Mountain Home, Arkansas State University Newport and Arkansas State University Three Rivers are all members of the Bi-State Conference of the NJCAA.

== History ==
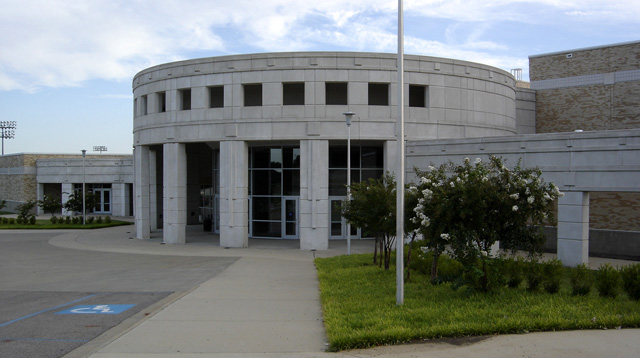
The Fowler Center on the Jonesboro campus of ASU is a regional center for the arts.

In 2006, the ASU System Office was created to facilitate future growth and enhanced services to the system institutions. The Board of Trustees named university president Dr. Les Wyatt as the first system president and Robert L. Potts as the first chancellor of the Jonesboro campus. The office was relocated from Jonesboro to Little Rock in 2011.

Arkansas State University in Jonesboro was established in 1909 as Arkansas State College. ASU-Beebe was established in 1927 as Junior Agricultural School of Central Arkansas and became part of ASU in 1955. ASU-Newport was founded as White River Vocational-Technical School in 1976 and became part of ASU-Beebe in 1992, but in 2002 the campus combined with Delta Technical Institute at Marked Tree to become a standalone institution. ASU-Mountain Home campus was established in 1995. Mid-South Community College in West Memphis became a member of the system in 2015 and changed its name to ASU Mid-South. College of the Ouachitas in Malvern became ASU Three Rivers and joined the ASU System on Jan. 1, 2020. The ASU System Board of Trustees on Dec. 6, 2019, approved a merger agreement and transition plan with Henderson State University in Arkadelphia, which would become the ASU System’s seventh member institution.

Act 18 of 2021 added Henderson State University, a four-year institution in Arkadelphia, to the ASU System and expanded the ASU System Board of Trustees from five to seven members.
