= Arkansas State University-Beebe =

Public college in Beebe, Arkansas, US

Coordinates: 35°04′25″N 91°53′45″W

- Former name: Junior Agricultural School of Central Arkansas (1927–1955); Arkansas State College–Beebe Branch (1955–1967); Arkansas State University-Beebe Branch (1967–2001)
- Type: Public community college
- Established: 1927; 99 years ago
- Parent institution: Arkansas State University System
- Affiliations: Arkansas State University System
- Chancellor: Dr. Jennifer Methvin
- Dean: Zackery Tucker
- Academic staff: 94 Full-time and 77 Part-time
- Students: 2,982 (all undergraduate)
- Location: Beebe, Arkansas, United States
- Campus: Multiple campuses
- Language: English
- Colors: Vanguard Blue and Red
- Mascot: Vanguard
- Website: www.asub.edu

Arkansas State University-Beebe is a public community college in Arkansas. The Beebe campus is accessible from Interstate 57 at Exit 29.

== Campuses ==
- Arkansas State University-Beebe
- Arkansas State University-Beebe Searcy Campus
- Arkansas State University-Beebe Heber Springs Campus
- Arkansas State University-Beebe at Little Rock Air Force Base in Jacksonville
- Arkansas State University-Beebe Online Campus

== Academics ==
=== Admission ===
ASU-Beebe has an open enrollment policy. For the 2023-2024 Academic Year, ASU-Beebe reported an annual headcount of 4,027 students.

As of the 2024–2025 academic year, tuition was $119.00 per credit hour. A tuition & fee estimate per semester was $2,085.00 for 15 credit hours.

=== Teaching and learning ===
ASU-Beebe offers degrees and certificates such as associate degrees, technical certificates, and certificates of proficiency. The associate degree programs last for two years for full-time students. Programs include liberal arts and sciences, general studies and humanities, health professions, and business management and marketing.

Physical campuses are located in Beebe, Heber Springs, Searcy, and the Little Rock Air Force Base (Jacksonville). The university also offers online-only courses via ASU-Beebe Online.

ASU-Beebe offers 2+2 programs in affiliation with other colleges and universities to work toward a bachelor's degree, such as the University of Central Arkansas. Students are assigned an academic advisor who ensures students only take classes that are transferable and will work toward their chosen degree. The university also has a partnership with Arkansas State University of Jonesboro to offer baccalaureate and graduate degrees on the Beebe campus.

=== Regional Career Center ===
ASU-Beebe has a Regional Career Center (RCC), which offers full academic college credit for high school students. High school students are eligible to receive concurrent credit while they attend high school. RCC locations include the Searcy and Heber Springs campuses as well as the Lonoke Business Academy.

== Student Services ==
=== Career Services ===
ASU-Beebe's Career Services offers workshops, seminars, résumé and cover letter assistance, mock interviews, and job search assistance. This includes the school's "Hire Vanguard" program that facilitates partnerships with area businesses for student job and internship placement.

=== Career Pathways ===
Career Pathways at ASU-Beebe helps low-income parents, providing benefits for eligible students which may include tuition and fees, childcare expenses, and fuel vouchers.

=== Veteran Services ===
ASU-Beebe's commitment to the military goes back years. In addition to its campus located on the Little Rock Air Force Base in Jacksonville, the university assists active-duty military, veterans and their families with educational funding.
