= Witcherville, Arkansas =

Coordinates: 35.1376°N 94.2644°W

Witcherville is an unincorporated community in Sebastian County, in the U.S. state of Arkansas. An old variant name was "Salem".

== History ==
Witcherville was originally called "Salem", and under the latter name was platted in 1868 by William J. Witcher. A post office called Witcherville was established in 1875, and remained in operation until 1926.
