= ASU Newport Aviators =

Athletics of Arkansas State University-Newport

ASU-Newport Aviators
- University: Arkansas State University-Newport
- Conference: Bi-State Conference
- NJCAA: Division II
- Athletic director: Brad Phillips
- Location: Newport, Arkansas
- Varsity teams: 2 (1 Men's, 1 Women's)
- Nickname: Aviators
- Website: asunaviators.com/landing/index

The ASU Newport Aviators are the athletic teams of Arkansas State University-Newport. They are a member of the NJCAA Division II.

== Sports sponsored ==
The Aviators currently have a men's basketball program and a women's softball program that compete in the Bi-State Conference. Aviator basketball is played in the gymnasium of Newport High School, meanwhile the women's softball team will play their games at George Kell Field in Newport.

== History ==
In June 2022, the board of trustees voted to establish an athletics program for the university.

In the spring of 2023, it was announced that ASU-Newport will compete in men's basketball and women's softball to start.

On March 1, 2023, it was announced that Logan Nutt will coach the Aviators basketball team. On the same day, Kevin Pearce was announced as the head coach of the women's softball team.
