= Arkansas State University–Mountain Home =

Community college in Mountain Home, Arkansas, US

Coordinates: 36°19′15″N 92°23′17″W

- Type: Public community college
- Established: July 1, 1995; 30 years ago
- Parent institution: Arkansas State University System
- Accreditation: HLC
- Chancellor: Bentley Wallace
- Students: 1,500
- Location: Mountain Home, Arkansas, United States
- Campus: Small city
- Language: English
- Colors: Medium Blue; Kelly Green
- Mascot: Trailblazers
- Website: asumh.edu

Arkansas State University–Mountain Home (ASUMH) is a public community college in Mountain Home, Arkansas. It is part of the Arkansas State University System and primarily serves students of north central Arkansas. Among other tracks, the college prepares nurses who may then go on to serve at the health complex and supporting facilities that surround the Baxter Regional Medical Center in Mountain Home. ASUMH serves approximately 1,500 students each year.

== Campus ==
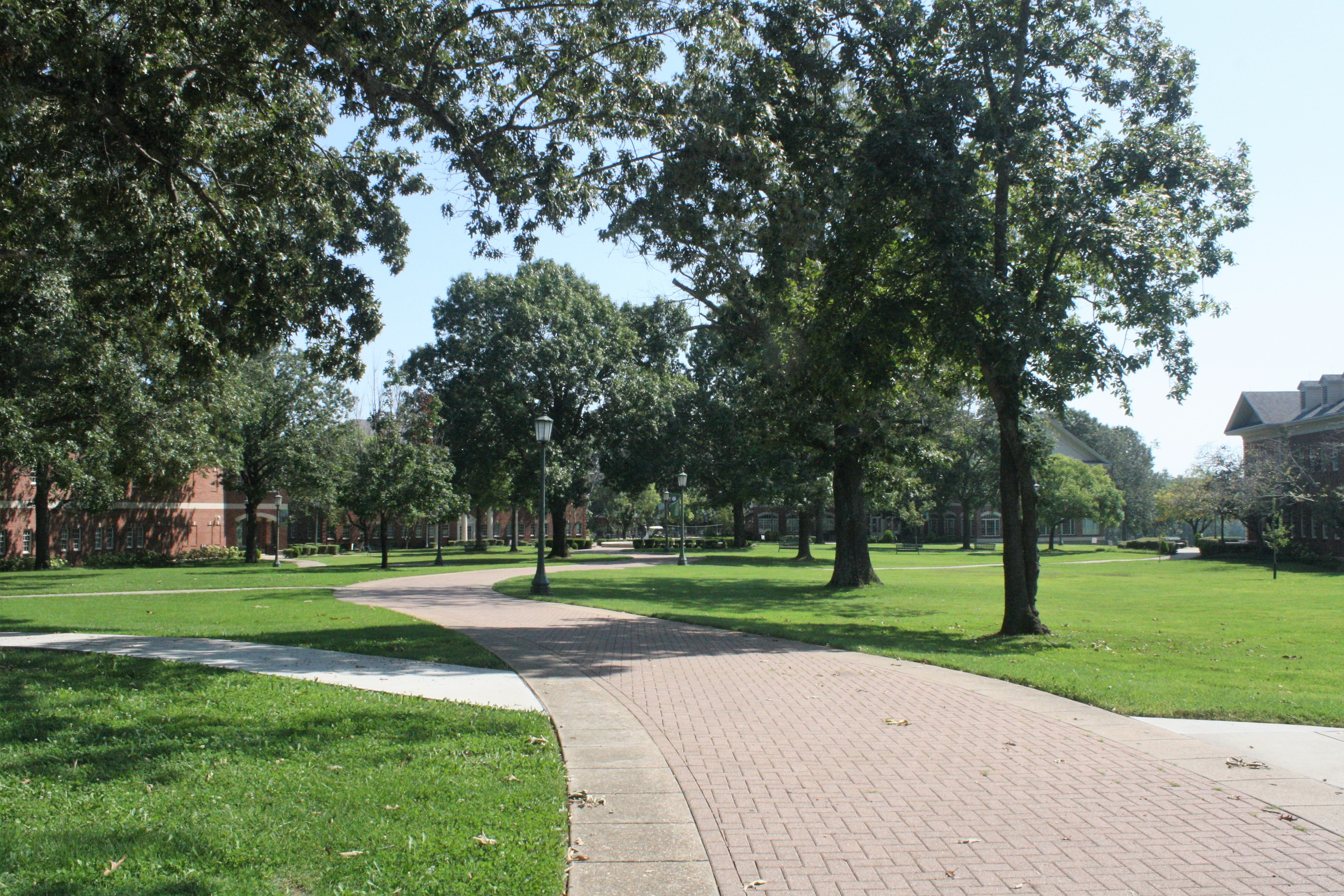
On campus

ASU established the Mountain Home campus on July 1, 1995, replacing the Mountain Home Community and Technical College. ASUMH held classes in downtown Mountain Home for the institution's first five years while funds were raised and a campus was constructed. The site of the former Mountain Home Baptist College at the southern end of College Street was purchased following a donation from the Jones family. Modeled after the University of Virginia, the $13M campus ($23.7 million in today's dollars) opened on January 12, 2000, following a parade from the old campus to the new buildings. Initial buildings included Dryer Hall, First National Hall, McClain Hall, and Roller Hall.

The Vada Sheid Community Development Center is the largest building on the ASUMH campus. The 65,000-square-foot (6,000 m^{2}) facility houses an 824-seat auditorium, McClure Convention Center, First Security Amphitheatre, Haley Family Conference Room, Ozark Regional Arts Council Conference Room and Dale Bumpers Great Hall for showing artwork or for receptions.

== Academics ==
Education at ASUMH is divided among three schools: Arts & Sciences, Business & Technology, and Health Sciences. The School of Arts and Sciences offers associate degrees in ten areas; Business & Technology offers eleven associates, ten technical certificates, and 12 certificate of proficiency. The School of Health Sciences offers two associates, eight technical certificates, and five certificates of proficiency. The Denver and Christine Roller Funeral Sciences Program is one of the few in the United States.

== See also ==
- List of colleges and universities in Arkansas
