= Cossatot Community College =

Community college in southwest Arkansas, U.S.

Coordinates: 34.1711°N 94.3157°W

Cossatot Community College of the University of Arkansas
- Motto: Learn More, Live Better.
- Type: Community College
- Established: 1975
- Affiliations: University of Arkansas System
- Chancellor: Dr. Steve Cole
- Students: 1,600
- Location: De Queen, Arkansas, USA
- Website: www.cccua.edu

Cossatot Community College of the University of Arkansas (CCCUA) is a public community college serving southwest Arkansas. Its main campus is located in the foothills of the Ouachita Mountains in De Queen, Arkansas.

== History ==
Cossatot Vocational-Technical School was established in 1975 to serve as a location for basic vocational education in southwest Arkansas. In 1991, the institution was renamed to Cossatot Technical College through legislative actions. Ten years later in 2001, Cossatot Technical College joined the University of Arkansas System, becoming Cossatot Community College of the University of Arkansas. Since then, the college has expanded to offer Technical Certificates in seven programs, Certificates of Proficiency in thirteen programs, and five Associate's Degree programs.

== Governance ==
UA Cossatot is governed by a nine-member Board of Visitors.

== Campus locations ==
CCCUA currently maintains three campuses, the main campus in De Queen and two extension campuses in nearby Nashville and Ashdown.

=== De Queen (Main) Campus ===
The De Queen campus serves as CCCUA's main campus and is divided into eleven separate buildings and areas. These buildings contain approximately 60,000 square feet (5,600 m^{2}), and are completely air-conditioned, with the exception of the Trade and Industry shops and the warehouse. Modern equipment, as well as the latest in teaching and audiovisual technology, are available to students.

=== Nashville Extension Site ===
An extension center in Nashville provides office and classroom space for a variety of credit and non-credit classes and special projects. This building has fully equipped computer labs.

=== Ashdown Extension Site ===
The Ashdown Extension is CCCUA's newest facility. This 53,640 sq ft (4,983 m^{2}). facility houses numerous programs for CCCUA and the Ashdown community. It has four large lecture classrooms, Internet/computer lab, a Computer Repair/CISCO lab, two interactive video classrooms, an Electrical Apprenticeship classroom, and a Hydraulics/Pneumatics classroom. Completed in 2009, the Ashdown campus renovation has introduced a Culinary Arts kitchen as well as the Barbara Horn Civic Center.

== Educational offerings ==
CCCUA offers both the Associate of Arts and Associate of Science degrees, which can be credited toward the first two years of a four-year degree program. The degrees consists of certain required courses and certain electives (which must be college transfer classes) in a specific focus area which will constitute the major.

The Associate of Science degree is offered for mathematics, science, computer science, or agriculture, of which 8–9 hours must be in a specific field.

CCCUA also offers the Associate of Arts Teaching degree in the Middle School area (language arts and math/science), an Associate of General Studies degree (for students needing a two-year degree but not a four-year degree) the Associate of Applied Science degree in 11 disciplines (a 12th discipline is pending approval), technical certificates in seven disciplines, and Certificates of Proficiency in 16 disciplines.

CCCUA students may take all courses required for the Associate of Arts and Associate of General Studies degrees, in their entirety, via the Internet.

CCCUA also offers adult education courses in five areas including the ability for students to work towards and obtain a General Equivalency Diploma (GED), and continuing education courses for the surrounding communities for both personal and work-related development.

CCCUA offers some courses through various forms of distance education; the Associate of Applied Science in Registered Nursing courses in nursing theory are done completely by interactive video as part of the Arkansas Rural Nursing Education Consortium, of which CCCUA's program is a member.

CCCUA has partnered with other community colleges, as well as with public and private universities in Arkansas, to offer bachelor's and master's degrees whereby students can complete most or all of their courses on the CCCUA campus facilities.

== Accreditation ==
CCCUA is accredited by the Higher Learning Commission of the North Central Association of Colleges and Schools, and its programs have been approved by the Arkansas Department of Higher Education. Several of its individual programs have been approved by national accrediting organizations as well.
