= Northwest Arkansas Community College =

Community college in Bentonville, Arkansas, U.S.

NorthWest Arkansas Community College
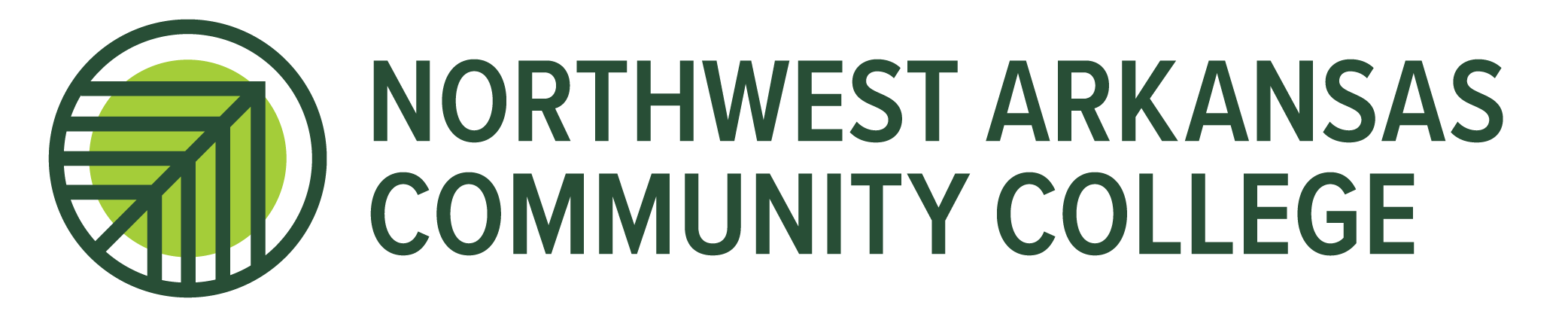
- Type: Public community college
- Established: August 15, 1989
- President: Dr. Dennis C. Rittle
- Students: 12,022 (Fall 2026)
- Location: Bentonville, Arkansas, United States; 36°21′30″N 94°10′21″W
- Campus: Suburban
- Mascot: Eagles
- Website: www.nwacc.edu

NorthWest Arkansas Community College (NWACC) is a public community college with its main campus in Bentonville, Arkansas. Total enrollment for the fall semester of 2026 was 12,022.

== History ==
NWACC was founded by voters in the Bentonville and Rogers Public School Districts on August 15, 1989, when they passed by a 65-percent margin a 3-mill property tax to support the new institution. NWACC opened its doors to 1,200 students in August 1990 and now enrolls 9,177 college-credit students (fall 2026), making it the largest two-year college in Arkansas. An additional 2,845 students are served by professional skills training (non-credit) courses and workshops throughout the Northwest Arkansas service area.

In the early days, NWACC was known as the "College without walls" because it solved the problem of not having enough "bricks and mortar" funding to build classrooms by conducting classes in a variety of buildings throughout the community.

Faculty often had to transport learning materials, equipment, and even laboratory specimen in their personal vehicles from one location to another to meet with students.

== Academics ==
Northwest Arkansas Community College offers many areas of study leading to associate degrees. and also provides the option to take online classes. NWACC is accredited by the Higher Learning Commission. As of 2019 NWACC operates a Transition Academic Program with the University of Arkansas to allow students to enroll, take courses and share credits at both schools, while simultaneously pursuing an associate degree at NWACC and a bachelor's degree at the University of Arkansas.

== Campuses and locations ==
=== Main Bentonville campus ===
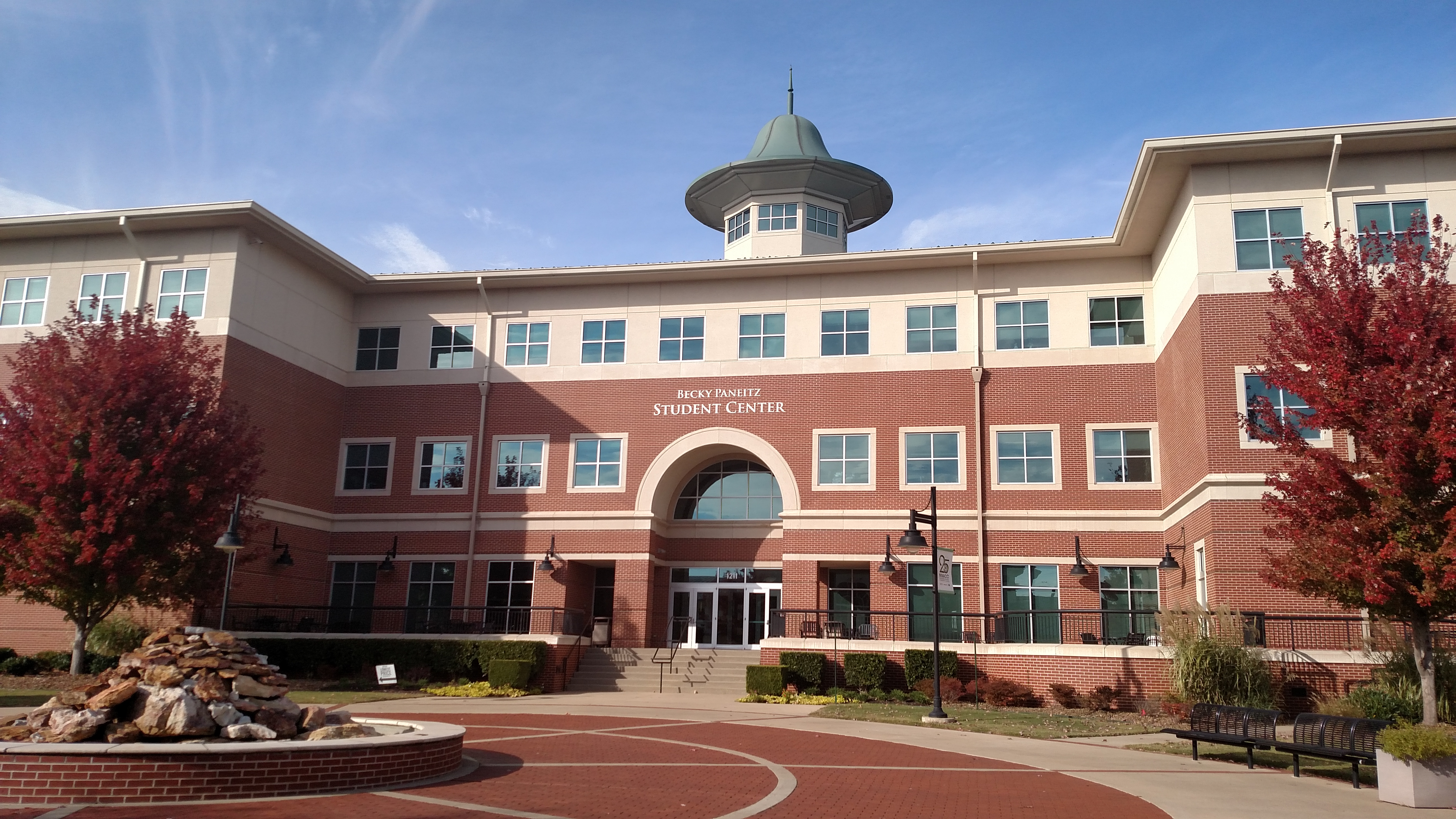
Student Center at NWACC

The main campus of Northwest Arkansas Community College is located in Bentonville, directly off of highway I-49. The main campus includes Burns Hall, the Becky Paneitz Student Center, Center for Health Professions, Shewmaker Center for Global Business Development, Shewmaker Center for Workforce Technologies, Integrated Design Lab, Cycling and Trails Education Center and Shewmaker National Child Protection Training Center, as well as a nature preserve.

In 2025, the NWACC Board of Trustees approved a master plan for its Bentonville campus, as a guide for the next 5-20 years of growth and expansion, including the areas of academics, integrated learning, athletics, arts, on-campus housing, facilities and open spaces for public use. The NWACC Campus Master Plan, coined the "Ozark Academic Village," envisions a "vibrant, walkable campus village that fosters connectivity, sustainability and a dynamic collegiate experience rooted in the local Northwest Arkansas landscape."

=== Brightwater: A Center for the Study of Food at NWACC ===
After beginning as the culinary program within NWACC, Brightwater was officially launched in early 2017 as separate operational entity, while still being a part of NWACC. The program is known for its emphasis on local food culture and the development of the "High South Cuisine" concept, which focuses on local, farm to table approach.

Brightwater officially opened in the 8th Street Market district of Bentonville within a former Tyson Foods chicken processing plant, allowing the enrollment to grow from a few dozen students to a maximum of 350.

The Brightwater facility and the 8th Street Market won the American Institute of Architects Central Excellence in Design award for 2017.

=== Washington County Center ===
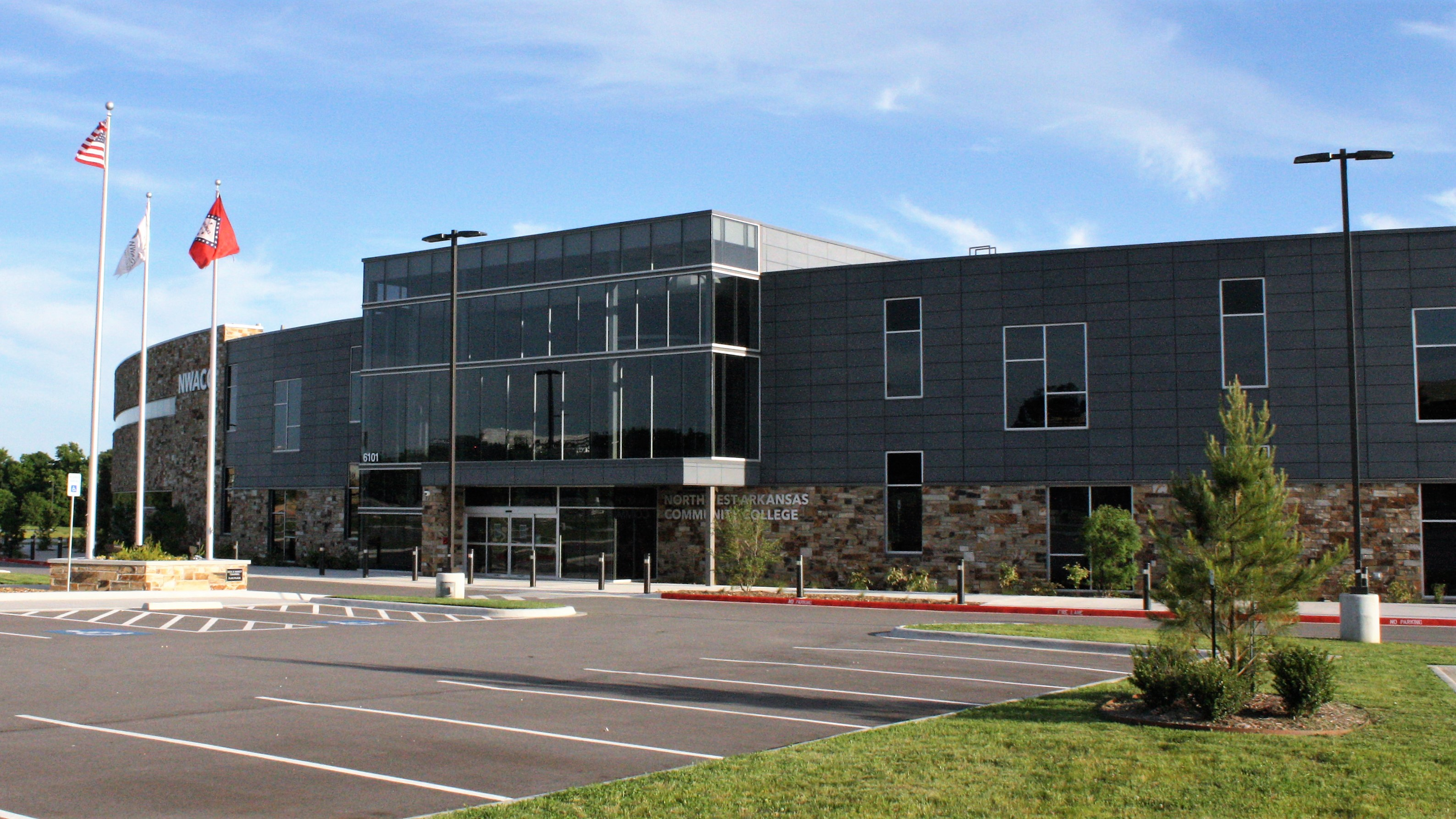
Washington County Center in Springdale

The Washington County Center in Springdale opened in 2019, consolidating operations from other sites in Springdale and Farmington at the new building near Arvest Ballpark and Arkansas Children's Hospital Northwest. The Washington County Center site in west Springdale was selected to improve access for the 36% of NWACC students residing in Washington County, as well as Siloam Springs students. The new building contains 14 classrooms, three labs, and an event space. A nursing simulation lab will increase the size of the nursing program.

== Clubs and organizations ==
There are 26 registered student organizations on campus, including honor societies, business, special interest, religious, international and cultural organizations, and many more. The Student Government Association (SGA) is the student body leadership organization which aims to represent both NWACC and NWACC students. Members host several student events each year, are student advocates, and also work with NWACC staff, faculty and administration to help make the student experience better.
