= Southeast Arkansas College =

Community college in Pine Bluff, Arkansas, U.S.

Coordinates: 34.2098°N 92.0248°W

- Former names: Pines Vocational-Technical School; Pines Technical College; Southeast Arkansas Technical College
- Motto: Success starts with SEARK
- Type: Public community college
- Established: 1991
- Accreditation: HLC
- President: Tyrone Jackson
- Students: 1,062
- Location: Pine Bluff, Arkansas, United States of America
- Faculty and staff: 145
- Colors: Teal Purple
- Website: www.seark.edu

Southeast Arkansas College (SEARK) is a public community college in Pine Bluff, Arkansas. Formerly a vocational-technical school, the state legislature designated the school as a college in 1991 with the name Pines Technical College. It acquired its current name in 1998.

== History ==
Southeast Arkansas College was originally named Arkansas Vocational-Technical School. It began offering post-secondary vocational-technical programs on September 21, 1959. Act 328 of 1957 set the stage for it to become the first vocational-technical school in Arkansas to meet the needs of industry and to provide jobs, and raise the standard of living, for Arkansas citizens. The school's first director was Leon Coker, who headed it from 1958 to 1974. The school's name was later changed to Pines Vocational-Technical School.

When Act 1244 of the Seventy-eighth Arkansas General Assembly, was signed into law by Governor Bill Clinton on April 17, 1991, it re-designated and redefined the mission of eleven existing post-secondary vocational-technical schools located throughout the state to technical colleges. Consequently, state authority for these institutions was transferred from the Arkansas Board of Vocational-Technical Education to the Arkansas Department of Higher Education, which serves as the state coordinating agency for all public universities, community colleges, and technical colleges in Arkansas.

With the enactment of Act 1244 on July 1, 1991, all land, buildings, equipment, and personnel associated with Pines Vocational-Technical School were transferred to Pines Technical College. In October 1991, the governor appointed the charter members of the Pines Technical College Board of Trustees. The college's first president, Terry J. Puckett (1992–2000), was appointed by the board effective December 1, 1992. To better reflect the college's service area, the college's leaders changed its name from Pines Technical College to Southeast Arkansas Technical College on July 1, 1996. The word "Technical" was removed from the college's name on July 8, 1998.

On May 17, 2024 the SEARK Board of Trustees announced Tyrone Jackson as the college's new president.

The college is accredited by the Higher Learning Commission, which placed it on probation in July 2024 for not meeting HLC criteria related to academic quality and rigor. The sanction was removed in June 2026.

== Academics ==
Educational programs and services at SEARK College include technical career education, workforce development, university transfer education, general education, adult education, continuing education, and community services. SEARK College provides nursing and allied health, criminal justice, computer training, and academic transfer programs, among others. As of 2007, its average enrollment is 2,200 students per semester with a faculty and staff of 132. The college also partners with the University of Arkansas at Pine Bluff to provide workforce training for the existing workforce and to provide basic skills and specialized training for the unemployed.

== Notable alumni ==
- Larry D. Alexander – artist and writer
