= North Arkansas College =

Community college in Harrison, Arkansas, U.S.

Coordinates: 36.2210°N 93.0882°W

North Arkansas College of the University of Arkansas
- Northark
- Other name: NAC-UA
- Former name: "NAC"
- Type: Public community college
- Established: 1974; 52 years ago
- Parent institution: University of Arkansas
- Endowment: $347,585 (2019)
- Chancellor: Rick Massengale
- Location: Harrison, Arkansas, United States
- Campus: Town, remote from an urban area
- Colors: Red and Gray
- Nicknames: Pioneers and Lady Pioneers
- Sporting affiliations: National Junior College Athletic Association
- Mascot: Pioneers
- Website: www.northark.edu

North Arkansas College of the University of Arkansas (NACUA, or UA Northark) is a public community college in Harrison, Arkansas. It is part of the University of Arkansas System and serves the citizens of Boone, Carroll, Marion, Searcy, Newton, and Madison counties in northern Arkansas. Northark has two campuses in Harrison and one in Berryville, Arkansas.

== History ==
It was organized in 1973 and opened in 1974 as a community college. On May 8, 2025, the college's board of trustees voted for the college to join the University of Arkansas System. On April 20, 2026, it officially merged with the University of Arkansas System.

== Academics ==
Northark offers an Associate of Arts degree and an Associate of Science degree in seven fields designed for students planning to transfer to a four-year institution. Northark offers sixteen majors for students earning an Associate of Applied Science, designed to lead to employment. The college also offers 23 technical certificates and 22 certificates of proficiency.

== Accreditation ==
North Arkansas College is accredited by the Higher Learning Commission.
