= University of Arkansas Rich Mountain =

Community college in Mena, Arkansas, US

- Former names: Rich Mountain Vocational-Technical School, Rich Mountain Community College
- Type: Public community college
- Established: 1973
- President: Phillip Wilson
- Faculty: 55
- Undergraduates: 1,004
- Location: Mena, Arkansas, United States; 34.59131°N 94.22020°W
- Website: http://www.uarichmountain.edu

University of Arkansas Rich Mountain (UARM) is a public community college in Mena, Arkansas. It has satellite campuses in Waldron, Wickes, Oden, and Mount Ida that serve Polk, Scott, and Montgomery counties. The college serves the citizens of the Ouachita Mountain Region.

== History ==
UARM was founded in 1973 as the Rich Mountain Vocational-Technical School, where it would serve as an affiliate of the Arkansas Department of Vocational Education. Accepting its first students in 1975, the school enrolled an entering class of approximately 250 students. In 1983, the school was merged with Henderson State University's off-campus program to form Rich Mountain Community College, as part of the establishment of the Polk County community college district. In 1990, it was accredited by the North Central Association of Colleges and Schools following 6 years in candidate status and was re-accredited in 2005 with the North Central Association noting it was a "model rural community college".

The forty-acre main campus in Mena includes the new Machine Tool Maintenance Building, St. John's Library, the KRMN-LP 101.1 FM radio station, and the RMCC TV broadcasting studio among the various classroom and administrative offices. Most students major in liberal arts, with business being the second largest concentration.

In February 2017, the college was acquired by the University of Arkansas System and renamed to University of Arkansas Rich Mountain.

=== Presidents ===
- 1973-1987 Mary Louise Spencer
- 1987-2000 Bill Abernathy
- 2000-2008 Janet Smith
- 2008–2011 Wayne Hatcher
- 2011–present Phillip M. Wilson

== See also ==
- Official website
