= National Park College =

Public community college in Hot Springs, Arkansas, US

- Former names: Garland County Community College, Quapaw Technical Institute
- Motto: Find Your Path
- Type: Public community college
- Established: 2003
- President: John Hogan
- Academic staff: 98
- Students: 2,768
- Location: Hot Springs, Arkansas, United States; 34.51259°N 93.11875°W
- Campus: suburban
- Nickname: Nighthawks
- Sporting affiliations: NJCAA – Bi-State Conference
- Website: www.np.edu

National Park College (NPC) is a public community college in Hot Springs, Arkansas. It was founded in 2003 as a result of a merger between Garland County Community College and Quapaw Technical Institute. It is now one of the state's largest community colleges, enrolling 3,000 students annually in credit programs and an additional 3,800 students in non-credit programs. Tuition at NPC is less than half that of Arkansas' universities. The name of the college is derived from its location adjacent to Hot Springs National Park.

== History ==
National Park College was founded in 2003 as a result of a merger between Garland County Community College and Quapaw Technical Institute, which had been established in 1973 and 1969, respectively. In 2006, as part of its initial capital campaign, the college received a donation of 1.5 million dollars from Frederick M. Dierks of Hot Springs, who had been associated with a business and owned timberland and produced pulp and paper, and that was sold to Weyerhaeuser in 1969. This was the largest cash donation in the history of Arkansas community colleges. These funds were purposed for a new nursing and health sciences facility. By December 2007, the college had raised an additional $900,000 for the campaign and initiated a joint program in early-childhood and middle-school teaching with Henderson State University.

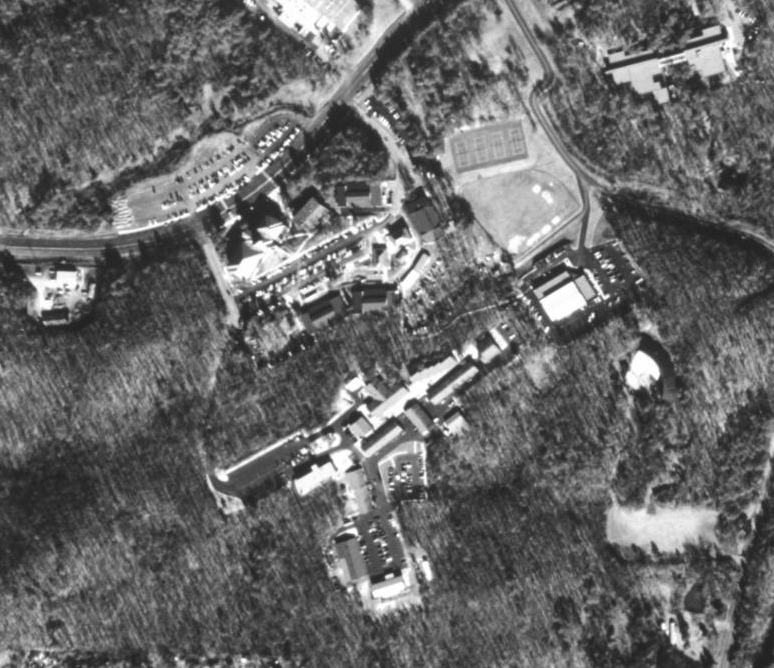
Aerial view of the campus

After Hurricane Katrina in 2005, NPC assisted students displaced from their home colleges by either enrolling them in its programs or finding colleges for them to enroll in.

In 1994, when it was known as Garland County Community College, the college was censured by the American Association of University Professors for failure to abide by the 1940 Statement of Principles on Academic Freedom and Tenure and 1958 Statement on Procedural Standards in Faculty Dismissal Proceedings. As of January 2025, the censure remains in place.
