= Arkansas State University-Newport =

Two-year college in Newport, Arkansas, US

Coordinates: 35°38′23″N 91°11′25″W

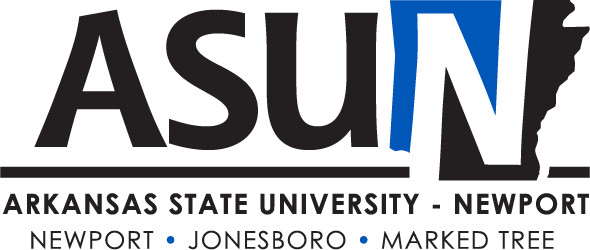
- Other name: ASU-Newport
- Former names: White River Vocational Institute, Arkansas State University Beebe/Newport, Delta Technical Institute (Marked Tree & Jonesboro)
- Type: Public community college
- Established: 1976
- Parent institution: Arkansas State University System
- Accreditation: Higher Learning Commission
- Chancellor: Sandra Massey
- President: Chuck Welch
- Students: 2,651
- Location: Newport, Arkansas; Jonesboro, Arkansas; Marked Tree, Arkansas, Arkansas, United States
- Colors: Blue, Black and White
- Nickname: Aviators
- Sporting affiliations: NJCAA Division II
- Website: www.asun.edu

Arkansas State University Newport is a public community college in northeast Arkansas with its main campus in Newport, Arkansas. It is part of the Arkansas State University System.

== Campuses ==
- Arkansas State University - Newport (Newport, AR)
- Arkansas State University - Newport at Marked Tree (Marked Tree, AR)
- Arkansas State University - Newport at Jonesboro (Jonesboro, AR)

== Athletics ==
On January 26, 2023, ASU-Newport announced that it will start athletic programs, beginning with men's basketball and women's softball, in the fall of 2023. They will be known as the Aviators and will compete in The NJCAA.
