= Arkansas State University Mid-South =

Community college in West Memphis, Arkansas

- Former name: Mid-South Community College
- Type: Public community college
- Established: 1992
- Accreditation: Higher Learning Commission
- Affiliations: Arkansas State University System
- Chancellor: Dr. Debra West
- Location: West Memphis, Arkansas, United States; 35°08′45″N 90°13′23″W
- Campus: Urban
- Colors: Red and Black
- Nickname: Greyhounds
- Sporting affiliations: NJCAA Division II
- Website: https://www.asumidsouth.edu/

Arkansas State University Mid-South, formerly Mid-South Community College (MSCC), is a public community college in West Memphis, Arkansas. ASU Mid-South offers degree programs, technical courses, community educational offerings, and intercollegiate athletics.

== History ==
Mid-South Community College was established in 1992. Its original purpose, before becoming a community college, was to provide vocational and technical education for the region. The college now offers associate degrees, technical certificates, certificates of proficiency, and college courses toward "core" requirements for four-year schools.

The college added intercollegiate athletics in 2010 with men's and women's basketball teams and adopted the Greyhounds mascot in recognition of a generous donation from Southland Park Gaming and Racing. Originally competing as a Division III member of the National Junior College Athletic Association (NJCAA), the Greyhounds moved to Division II in 2012 where they currently compete as a member of NJCAA Region 2.

On January 11, 2015, the MSCC and Arkansas State University System Board of Trustees announced that MSCC would join the Arkansas State University System as ASU Mid-South, and the merger became official on July 1, 2015.

== Governance ==
ASU Mid-South is governed by the Arkansas State University System Board of Trustees. Locally, a seven-member Board of Visitors advises the Board of Trustees on issues related to the college.

== Campus ==
Workforce Technology Center

The ASU Mid-South Main Campus is located at 2000 West Broadway in West Memphis, and it includes a 64,000-square-foot (5,900 m^{2}) building named the Donald W. Reynolds Center for Academic Excellence, completed in 2000 at a cost of 12 million dollars. The center includes the library, multimedia rooms, office space and food service areas. The south campus houses five classroom buildings and the Glen F. Fenter Athletic Complex, which opened in 2013, and is home of Greyhound Athletics, the college's NJCAA sports teams.

On the north campus is a Workforce Technology Center, a 38,000-square-foot (3,500 m^{2}) building which houses the college's Aviation Maintenance Technology, Machining, and Mechatronics programs as well as classrooms and offices. In addition, the north campus includes the Marion Berry Renewable Energy Center for Process Technology and Diesel Technology training and instruction and the Jeffrey Jacobs Hospitality and Management Center, opened in August, 2015.

The FedEx Aviation Technology Center opened in 2017 on Arkansas State University Mid-South's south campus. The 22,000-sq.ft. facility includes an aircraft hangar space, classrooms, labs and support areas. The facility is equipped with a large, hands-on learning tool – a Boeing 727 jet – compliments of the global transportation company 20 miles due east. As part of its Aircraft Donation Program, FedEx in 2012 donated the jet to the school.
