= Arkansas State University Three Rivers =

Public two year college in Malvern, Arkansas, US

- Other name: ASU Three Rivers
- Former name: College of the Ouachitas Ouachita Technical College
- Type: Public, two year college
- Established: July 1969; 57 years ago
- Founder: Arkansas State Board of Education
- Affiliations: NCA
- President: Dr. Steve Rook
- Students: ~3,500
- Location: 1 College Circle, Malvern, Arkansas, 72104-3520, USA; 34.378704°N 92.821836°W
- Campus: Rural
- Language: English
- Website: asutr.edu

Arkansas State University Three Rivers (ASU Three Rivers) is a public, two year college in Malvern, Arkansas. In 2020, it joined the ASU System and changed to its current name.

ASU Three Rivers has approximately 3,500 students annually through its degree programs, technical courses, and community educational offerings.

== History ==
ASU Three Rivers was established in July 1969 as Ouachita Vocational Technical School. The inaugural classes took place in January 1972, with 292 students enrolled in the certificate programs, such as automotive repair, food service, and cosmetology. In 1991, Governor Bill Clinton signed legislation that reorganized the state's vo-tech institutions into two-year accredited colleges. The newly renamed Ouachita Technical College subsequently offered a broader degree of associate programs, such as nursing, business administration, manufacturing technology, and criminal justice. As the number of programs began to expand, the school changed its name in 2011 to College of the Ouachitas to better reflect its comprehensive mission.

On January 1, 2020, the college officially joined the ASU System.

== Governance ==
ASU Three Rivers is governed by a seven-member Board of Trustees, appointed by the Governor. Each trustee serves a seven-year term which ends on June 30 of the final year.

== Campus ==
The ASU Three Rivers campus was originally located in a former segregated high school building in Hot Springs that was shuttered in the 1960s. Following the accreditation of the school, the City of Malvern adopted a 1 cent sales tax to exclusively fund the college. New campus buildings were constructed in the 1990s and early 2000s, including a library in 1999.

== Accreditation ==
ASUTR is accredited by the Higher Learning Commission, and its programs have been approved by the Arkansas Department of Higher Education and the Arkansas State Board of Vocational Education.

== Sources ==
- Arkansas State University Three Rivers at Encyclopedia of Arkansas
