= List of community colleges =

This is a list of community colleges or current baccalaureate-granting institutions which used to be known as community colleges, junior colleges, or technical colleges.

== Australia ==
- Sydney Community College

== Barbados ==
- Barbados Community College

== British dependencies ==
=== Bermuda ===
- Bermuda College

=== British Virgin Islands ===
- H. Lavity Stoutt Community College, Tortola

=== Cayman Islands ===
- University College of the Cayman Islands

=== Montserrat ===
- Montserrat Community College (some associate's degrees)

=== Turks and Caicos ===
- Turks and Caicos Islands Community College

== Canada ==
- Assiniboine College
- Maskwacis Cultural College
- Old Sun Community College
- Red Crow Community College

== Hong Kong ==
- UOW College Hong Kong

== Malaysia ==
=== Johor ===
- Bandar Penawar Community College, Bandar Penawar
  - Branch campus, Bandar Tenggara
- Ledang Community College, Tangkak
- Pasir Gudang Community College, Pasir Gudang
  - Branch campus, Tanjung Piai, Pontian
- Segamat Community College, Segamat
- Segamat 2 Community College, Batu Aman

=== Kedah ===
- Bandar Darulaman Community College, Jitra
- Kulim Community College, Kulim
- Langkawi Community College, Langkawi
- Sungai Petani Community College, Sungai Petani

=== Malacca ===
- Bukit Beruang Community College, Bukit Beruang
- Jasin Community College, Jasin
- Masjid Tanah Community College, Masjid Tanah
- Selandar Community College, Selandar

=== Negeri Sembilan ===
- Jelebu Community College, Kuala Klawang
- Jempol Community College, Bahau

=== Pahang ===
- Bentong Community College, Karak
- Kuantan Community College, Kuantan
- Mentakab Community College, Temerloh
- Paya Besar Community College, Gambang
- Raub Community College, Raub
- Rompin Community College, Kuala Rompin

=== Penang ===
- Bayan Baru Community College, Air Itam
- Bukit Mertajam Community College, Tanah Liat
- Kepala Batas Community College, Kepala Batas
- Nibong Tebal Community College, Simpang Ampat
- Seberang Jaya Community College, Seberang Jaya
- Tasek Gelugor Community College, Teluk Air Tawar

=== Perak ===
- Chenderoh Community College, Kuala Kangsar
- Grik Community College, Gerik
- Pasir Salak Community College, Kampung Gajah
- Sungai Siput Community College, Sungai Siput
- Taiping Community College, Kamunting
- Teluk Intan Community College, Seri Manjung

=== Perlis ===
- Arau Community College, Arau

=== Sabah ===
- Semporna Community College, Semporna
- Tawau Community College, Tawau

=== Sarawak ===
- Kuching Community College, Kuching

=== Selangor ===
- Hulu Langat Community College, Kajang
- Hulu Selangor Community College, Batang Kali
- Kuala Langat Community College, Kuala Langat
- Sabak Bernam Community College, Sabak Bernam
- Selayang Community College, Batu Caves

=== Terengganu ===
- Kuala Terengganu Community College, Kuala Terengganu

== Saint Lucia ==
- Sir Arthur Lewis Community College

== United States ==
Community colleges in the United States

=== Alabama ===
- Bevill State Community College
- Bishop State Community College
- Calhoun Community College
- Central Alabama Community College
- Chattahoochee Valley Community College
- Coastal Alabama Community College
- Community College of the Air Force
- Enterprise State Community College
- Gadsden State Community College
- H. Councill Trenholm State Community College
- J.F. Drake State Community and Technical College
- J. F. Ingram State Technical College
- Jefferson State Community College
- Lawson State Community College
- Lurleen B. Wallace Community College
- Marion Military Institute
- Northeast Alabama Community College
- Northwest–Shoals Community College
- Reid State Technical College
- Shelton State Community College
- Snead State Community College
- Southern Union State Community College
- Wallace Community College
- Wallace Community College Selma
- Wallace State Community College

=== Alaska ===
- Iḷisaġvik College
- University of Alaska Anchorage has five community college campuses, including:
  - Kenai Peninsula College
  - Kodiak College
  - Matanuska–Susitna College
  - Prince William Sound College
- University of Alaska Fairbanks has four community college campuses.
  - UAF Community and Technical College
- University of Alaska Southeast has two community college campuses.

=== American Samoa ===
- American Samoa Community College

=== Arizona ===
- Arizona Western College
- Central Arizona College
- Cochise College
- Coconino County Community College
- Diné College
- Eastern Arizona College
- Gila Community College District
  - Gila Community College
- Maricopa County Community College District
  - Chandler–Gilbert Community College
  - Estrella Mountain Community College
  - GateWay Community College
  - Glendale Community College
  - Mesa Community College
  - Paradise Valley Community College
  - Phoenix College
  - Rio Salado College
  - Scottsdale Community College
  - South Mountain Community College
- Mohave Community College
- Northland Pioneer College
- Pima Community College
- Tohono Oʼodham Community College
- Yavapai College

=== Arkansas ===
- Arkansas Northeastern College
- Arkansas State University-Beebe
- Arkansas State University Mid-South
- Arkansas State University–Mountain Home
- Arkansas State University-Newport
- Arkansas State University Three Rivers
- Black River Technical College
- East Arkansas Community College
- National Park College
- North Arkansas College
- Northwest Arkansas Community College
- Ozarka College
- Pulaski Technical College
- South Arkansas Community College
- Southeast Arkansas College
- Southern Arkansas University Tech
- The University of Arkansas System
  - Cossatot Community College
  - Phillips Community College
  - UACC Batesville
  - UACC Morrilton
  - University of Arkansas Hope-Texarkana
  - University of Arkansas Rich Mountain

=== Colorado ===
- Aims Community College
- Arapahoe Community College
- Colorado Community Colleges Online
- Colorado Mountain College
- Colorado Northwestern Community College
- Community College of Aurora
- Community College of Denver
- Front Range Community College
- Lamar Community College
- Morgan Community College
- Northeastern Junior College
- Otero College
- Pikes Peak State College
- Pueblo Community College
- Red Rocks Community College
- Trinidad State College
- Western Colorado Community College

=== Connecticut ===
- Asnuntuck Community College
- Capital Community College
- Gateway Community College
- Housatonic Community College
- Manchester Community College
- Middlesex Community College
- Naugatuck Valley Community College
- Northwestern Connecticut Community College
- Norwalk Community College
- Quinebaug Valley Community College
- Three Rivers Community College
- Tunxis Community College

=== Delaware ===
- Delaware Technical Community College

=== District of Columbia ===
- University of the District of Columbia Community College

=== Florida ===
- Broward College
- Chipola College
- College of Central Florida
- The College of the Florida Keys
- Daytona State College
- Eastern Florida State College
- Florida Gateway College
- Florida SouthWestern State College
- Florida State College at Jacksonville
- Gulf Coast State College
- Hillsborough Community College
- Indian River State College
- Lake–Sumter State College
- Miami Dade College
- North Florida College
- Northwest Florida State College
- Palm Beach State College
- Pasco–Hernando State College
- Pensacola State College
- Polk State College
- St. Johns River State College
- St. Petersburg College
- Santa Fe College
- Seminole State College of Florida
- South Florida State College
- State College of Florida, Manatee–Sarasota
- Tallahassee Community College
- Valencia College

=== Georgia ===
- Technical College System of Georgia
  - Albany Technical College
  - Altamaha Technical College
  - Athens Technical College
  - Atlanta Technical College
  - Augusta Technical College
  - Central Georgia Technical College
  - Chattahoochee Technical College
  - Coastal Pines Technical College
  - Columbus Technical College
  - Georgia Northwestern Technical College
  - Georgia Piedmont Technical College
  - Gwinnett Technical College
  - Lanier Technical College
  - Moultrie Technical College
  - North Georgia Technical College
  - Oconee Fall Line Technical College
  - Ogeechee Technical College
  - Savannah Technical College
  - South Georgia Technical College
  - Southeastern Technical College
  - Southern Crescent Technical College
  - Southern Regional Technical College
  - West Georgia Technical College
  - Wiregrass Georgia Technical College

=== Guam ===
- Guam Community College

=== Hawaii ===
- University of Hawaii
  - Hawaiʻi Community College
  - Honolulu Community College
  - Kapiʻolani Community College
  - Kauaʻi Community College
  - Leeward Community College
  - University of Hawaiʻi Maui College
  - Windward Community College

=== Idaho ===
- College of Eastern Idaho
- College of Southern Idaho
- College of Western Idaho
- North Idaho College

=== Illinois ===
Community college district numbers are given for each district. Some colleges were established by school districts prior to being organized as college districts.

- Black Hawk College (No. 503)
- Carl Sandburg College (No. 518)
- City Colleges of Chicago (No. 508)
  - Harold Washington College
  - Kennedy–King College
  - Malcolm X College
  - Olive–Harvey College
  - Richard J. Daley College
  - Truman College
  - Wilbur Wright College
- College of DuPage (No. 502)
- College of Lake County (No. 532)
- Danville Area Community College (No. 507)
- East St. Louis Community College Center (not independent)
  - Metropolitan Community College (No. 541) (1996–1998)
  - State Community College of East Saint Louis (No. 601) (1969–1996)
- Elgin Community College (No. 509)
- Harper College (No. 512)
- Heartland Community College (No. 540)
- Highland Community College (No. 519)
- Illinois Central College (No. 514)
- Illinois Eastern Community Colleges (No. 529)
  - Frontier Community College
  - Lincoln Trail College
  - Olney Central College
  - Wabash Valley College
- Illinois Valley Community College (No. 513)
- John A. Logan College (No. 530)
- John Wood Community College (No. 539)
- Joliet Junior College (No. 525)
- Kankakee Community College (No. 520)
- Kaskaskia College (No. 501)
- Kishwaukee College (No. 523)
- Lake Land College (No. 517)
- Lewis and Clark Community College (No. 536)
- Lincoln Land Community College (No. 526)
- McHenry County College (No. 528)
- Moraine Valley Community College (No. 524)
- Morton College (No. 527)
- Oakton College (No. 535)
- Parkland College (No. 505)
- Prairie State College (No. 515)
- Rend Lake College (No. 521)
- Richland Community College (No. 537)
- Rock Valley College (No. 511)
- Sauk Valley Community College (No. 506)
- Shawnee Community College (No. 531)
- South Suburban College (No. 510)
- Southeastern Illinois College (No. 533)
- Southwestern Illinois College (No. 522)
- Spoon River College (No. 534)
- Triton College (No. 504)
- Waubonsee Community College (No. 516)

=== Indiana ===
- Ivy Tech Community College of Indiana (30 campuses statewide)

=== Iowa ===
- Des Moines Area Community College
- Eastern Iowa Community Colleges
  - Clinton Community College
  - Muscatine Community College
  - Scott Community College
- Hawkeye Community College
- Indian Hills Community College
- Iowa Central Community College
- Iowa Lakes Community College
- Iowa Valley Community College District
  - Ellsworth Community College
  - Marshalltown Community College
    - Iowa Valley Grinnell, a satellite campus of Marshalltown Community College
- Iowa Western Community College
- Kirkwood Community College
- North Iowa Area Community College
- Northeast Iowa Community College
- Northwest Iowa Community College
- Southeastern Community College
- Southwestern Community College
- Western Iowa Tech Community College

=== Kansas ===
- Allen Community College
- Barton Community College
- Butler Community College
- Cloud County Community College
- Coffeyville Community College
- Colby Community College
- Cowley College
- Dodge City Community College
- Donnelly College
- Fort Scott Community College
- Garden City Community College
- Highland Community College
- Hutchinson Community College
- Independence Community College
- Johnson County Community College
- Kansas City Kansas Community College
- Labette Community College
- Neosho County Community College
- Pratt Community College
- Seward County Community College

=== Kentucky ===
- Ashland Community and Technical College
- Big Sandy Community and Technical College
- Bluegrass Community and Technical College
- Elizabethtown Community and Technical College
- Gateway Community and Technical College
- Hazard Community and Technical College
- Henderson Community College
- Hopkinsville Community College
- Jefferson Community and Technical College
- Madisonville Community College
- Maysville Community and Technical College
- Owensboro Community and Technical College
- Somerset Community College
- Southcentral Kentucky Community and Technical College
- Southeast Kentucky Community and Technical College
- West Kentucky Community and Technical College

=== Louisiana ===
- Baton Rouge Community College
- Bossier Parish Community College
- Central Louisiana Technical Community College
- Delgado Community College
- L.E. Fletcher Technical Community College
- Louisiana Delta Community College
- Louisiana Technical College
- Northshore Technical Community College
- Northwest Louisiana Technical College
- Nunez Community College
- River Parishes Community College
- South Central Louisiana Technical College
- South Louisiana Community College
- Sowela Technical Community College

=== Maine ===
- Central Maine Community College
- Eastern Maine Community College
- Kennebec Valley Community College
- Northern Maine Community College
- Southern Maine Community College
- Washington County Community College
- York County Community College

=== Maryland ===
- Allegany College of Maryland
- Anne Arundel Community College
- Baltimore City Community College
- Carroll Community College
- Cecil College
- Chesapeake College
- College of Southern Maryland
- Community College of Baltimore County
- Frederick Community College
- Garrett College
- Hagerstown Community College
- Harford Community College
- Howard Community College
- Montgomery College
- Prince George's Community College
- Wor–Wic Community College

=== Massachusetts ===
- Berkshire Community College
- Bristol Community College
- Bunker Hill Community College
- Cape Cod Community College
- Greenfield Community College
- Holyoke Community College
- Massachusetts Bay Community College
- Massasoit Community College
- Middlesex Community College
- Mount Wachusett Community College
- North Shore Community College
- Northern Essex Community College
- Quinsigamond Community College
- Roxbury Community College
- Springfield Technical Community College

=== Michigan ===
- Alpena Community College
- Bay de Noc Community College
- Bay Mills Community College
- Delta College
- Glen Oaks Community College
- Gogebic Community College
- Grand Rapids Community College
- Henry Ford College
- Jackson College
- Kalamazoo Valley Community College
- Kellogg Community College
- Keweenaw Bay Ojibwa Community College
- Kirtland Community College
- Lake Michigan College
- Lansing Community College
- Macomb Community College
- Mid Michigan Community College
- Monroe County Community College
- Montcalm Community College
- Mott Community College
- Muskegon Community College
- North Central Michigan College
- Northwestern Michigan College
- Oakland Community College
- St. Clair County Community College
- Schoolcraft College
- Southwestern Michigan College
- Washtenaw Community College
- Wayne County Community College District
- West Shore Community College

=== Minnesota ===
- Alexandria Technical and Community College
- Anoka-Ramsey Community College
- Anoka Technical College
- Central Lakes College
- Century College
- Dakota County Technical College
- Fond du Lac Tribal and Community College
- Hennepin Technical College
- Hibbing Community College
- Inver Hills Community College
- Itasca Community College
- Lake Superior College
- Mesabi Range College
- Minneapolis Community and Technical College
- Minnesota State College Southeast
- Minnesota State Community and Technical College
- Minnesota West Community and Technical College
- Normandale Community College
- North Hennepin Community College
- Northland Community & Technical College
- Pine Technical and Community College
- Rainy River Community College
- Red Lake Nation College
- Ridgewater College
- Riverland Community College
- Rochester Community and Technical College
- St. Cloud Technical and Community College
- Saint Paul College
- South Central College
- Vermilion Community College
- White Earth Tribal and Community College

=== Mississippi ===
- Coahoma Community College
- Copiah–Lincoln Community College
- East Central Community College
- East Mississippi Community College
- Hinds Community College
- Holmes Community College
- Itawamba Community College
- Jones County Junior College
- Meridian Community College
- Mississippi Delta Community College
- Mississippi Gulf Coast Community College
- Northeast Mississippi Community College
- Northwest Mississippi Community College
- Pearl River Community College
- Southwest Mississippi Community College

=== Missouri ===
- Crowder College
- East Central College
- Jefferson College
- Metropolitan Community College
- Mineral Area College
- Missouri State University–West Plains
- Moberly Area Community College
- North Central Missouri College
- Ozarks Technical Community College
- St. Charles Community College
- St. Louis Community College
- State Fair Community College
- State Technical College of Missouri
- Three Rivers College

=== Montana ===
- Aaniiih Nakoda College
- Blackfeet Community College
- Chief Dull Knife College
- City College at Montana State University Billings
- Dawson Community College
- Flathead Valley Community College
- Fort Peck Community College
- Gallatin College Montana State University
- Great Falls College Montana State University
- Helena College University of Montana
- Little Big Horn College
- Miles Community College
- Missoula College University of Montana
- Montana Technological University
- Salish Kootenai College
- Stone Child College
- University of Montana Bitterroot College

=== Nebraska ===
- Central Community College
- Metropolitan Community College
- Mid-Plains Community College
- Nebraska College of Technical Agriculture
- Nebraska Indian Community College
- Northeast Community College
- Southeast Community College
- Western Nebraska Community College

=== Nevada ===
- College of Southern Nevada
- Truckee Meadows Community College
- Western Nevada College

=== New Hampshire ===
- Great Bay Community College
- Lakes Region Community College
- Manchester Community College
- Nashua Community College
- NHTI – Concord's Community College
- River Valley Community College
- White Mountains Community College

=== New Jersey ===
- Atlantic Cape Community College
- Bergen Community College
- Brookdale Community College
- Camden County College
- County College of Morris
- Essex County College
- Hudson County Community College
- Mercer County Community College
- Middlesex College
- Ocean County College
- Passaic County Community College
- Raritan Valley Community College
- Rowan College at Burlington County
- Rowan College of South Jersey
- Salem Community College
- Sussex County Community College
- Union College
- Warren County Community College

=== New Mexico ===
- Central New Mexico Community College
- Clovis Community College
- Diné College
- Doña Ana Community College
- Luna Community College
- Mesalands Community College
- New Mexico Junior College
- New Mexico Military Institute
- New Mexico State University Alamogordo
- Northern New Mexico College
- San Juan College
- Santa Fe Community College
- Southwestern Indian Polytechnic Institute

=== New York ===
- Borough of Manhattan Community College
- Bronx Community College
- Cayuga Community College
- Clinton Community College
- Columbia–Greene Community College
- Corning Community College
- Dutchess Community College
- Finger Lakes Community College
- Fulton–Montgomery Community College
- Genesee Community College
- Guttman Community College
- Herkimer County Community College
- Hostos Community College
- Hudson Valley Community College
- Jamestown Community College
- Jefferson Community College
- Kingsborough Community College
- LaGuardia Community College
- Mohawk Valley Community College
- Monroe Community College
- Nassau Community College
- North Country Community College
- Onondaga Community College
- Queensborough Community College
- Rockland Community College
- Schenectady County Community College
- Suffolk County Community College
- SUNY Adirondack
- SUNY Broome Community College
- SUNY Erie
- SUNY Niagara
- SUNY Orange
- SUNY Sullivan
- SUNY Ulster
- Tompkins Cortland Community College
- Westchester Community College

=== North Carolina ===
- Alamance Community College
- Asheville–Buncombe Technical Community College
- Beaufort County Community College
- Bladen Community College
- Blue Ridge Community College
- Brunswick Community College
- Caldwell Community College & Technical Institute
- Cape Fear Community College
- Carteret Community College
- Catawba Valley Community College
- Central Carolina Community College
- Central Piedmont Community College
- Cleveland Community College
- Coastal Carolina Community College
- College of The Albemarle
- Craven Community College
- Davidson-Davie Community College
- Durham Technical Community College
- Edgecombe Community College
- Fayetteville Technical Community College
- Forsyth Technical Community College
- Gaston College
- Guilford Technical Community College
- Halifax Community College
- Haywood Community College
- Isothermal Community College
- James Sprunt Community College
- Johnston Community College
- Lenoir Community College
- Martin Community College
- Mayland Community College
- McDowell Technical Community College
- Mitchell Community College
- Montgomery Community College
- Nash Community College
- Pamlico Community College
- Piedmont Community College
- Pitt Community College
- Randolph Community College
- Richmond Community College
- Roanoke–Chowan Community College
- Robeson Community College
- Rockingham Community College
- Rowan–Cabarrus Community College
- Sampson Community College
- Sandhills Community College
- South Piedmont Community College
- Southeastern Community College
- Southwestern Community College
- Stanly Community College
- Surry Community College
- Tri-County Community College
- Vance–Granville Community College
- Wake Technical Community College
- Wayne Community College
- Western Piedmont Community College
- Wilkes Community College
- Wilson Community College

=== North Dakota ===
- Bismarck State College
- Cankdeska Cikana Community College
- Dakota College at Bottineau
- Lake Region State College
- North Dakota State College of Science
- Nueta Hidatsa Sahnish College
- Sitting Bull College
- Turtle Mountain College
- United Tribes Technical College
- Williston State College

=== Northern Mariana Islands ===
- Northern Marianas College

=== Ohio ===
- Belmont College
- Central Ohio Technical College
- Cincinnati State Technical and Community College
- Clark State College
- Columbus State Community College
- Cuyahoga Community College
- Eastern Gateway Community College
- Edison State Community College
- Hocking College
- Lakeland Community College
- Lorain County Community College
- Marion Technical College
- North Central State College
- Northwest State Community College
- Ohio State University Agricultural Technical Institute
- Owens Community College
- Rhodes State College
- Rio Grande Community College
- Sinclair Community College
- Southern State Community College
- Stark State College
- Terra State Community College
- University of Cincinnati Clermont College
- Washington State College of Ohio
- Zane State College

=== Oklahoma ===
- Carl Albert State College
- Connors State College
- Eastern Oklahoma State College
- Murray State College
- Northeastern Oklahoma A&M College
- Northern Oklahoma College
- Oklahoma City Community College
- Redlands Community College
- Rose State College
- Seminole State College
- Tulsa Community College
- Western Oklahoma State College

=== Oregon ===
- Blue Mountain Community College
- Central Oregon Community College
- Chemeketa Community College
- Clackamas Community College
- Clatsop Community College
- Columbia Gorge Community College
- Klamath Community College
- Lane Community College
- Linn–Benton Community College
- Mt. Hood Community College
- Oregon Coast Community College
- Portland Community College
- Rogue Community College
- Southwestern Oregon Community College
- Tillamook Bay Community College
- Treasure Valley Community College
- Umpqua Community College

=== Pennsylvania ===
- Bucks County Community College
- Butler County Community College
- Community College of Allegheny County
- Community College of Beaver County
- Community College of Philadelphia
- Delaware County Community College
- Erie County Community College
- Harrisburg Area Community College
- Lehigh Carbon Community College
- Luzerne County Community College
- Montgomery County Community College
- Northampton Community College
- Pennsylvania Highlands Community College
- Reading Area Community College
- Westmoreland County Community College

=== Puerto Rico ===
- Instituto Comercial de Puerto Rico

=== Rhode Island ===
- Community College of Rhode Island

=== South Carolina ===
- Aiken Technical College
- Central Carolina Technical College
- Denmark Technical College
- Florence–Darlington Technical College
- Greenville Technical College
- Horry-Georgetown Technical College
- Midlands Technical College
- Northeastern Technical College
- Orangeburg–Calhoun Technical College
- Piedmont Technical College
- Spartanburg Community College
- Technical College of the Lowcountry
- Tri-County Technical College
- Trident Technical College
- Williamsburg Technical College
- York Technical College

=== South Dakota ===
- Kilian Community College
- Lake Area Technical College
- Mitchell Technical Institute
- Oglala Lakota College
- Sisseton Wahpeton College
- Southeast Technical Institute
- Western Dakota Technical Institute

=== Tennessee ===
- Chattanooga State Community College
- Cleveland State Community College
- Columbia State Community College
- Dyersburg State Community College
- Jackson State Community College
- Motlow State Community College
- Nashville State Community College
- Northeast State Community College
- Pellissippi State Community College
- Roane State Community College
- Southwest Tennessee Community College
- Volunteer State Community College
- Walters State Community College

=== Texas ===
- Alamo Colleges District
  - Northeast Lakeview College
  - Northwest Vista College
  - Palo Alto College
  - St. Philip's College
  - San Antonio College
- Alvin Community College
- Amarillo College
- Angelina College
- Austin Community College District
- Blinn College
- Brazosport College
- Central Texas College
- Cisco College
- Clarendon College
- Coastal Bend College
- College of the Mainland
- Collin College
- Dallas College
  - Brookhaven Campus
  - Cedar Valley Campus
  - Eastfield Campus
  - El Centro Campus
  - Mountain View Campus
  - North Lake Campus
  - Richland Campus
- Del Mar College
- El Paso Community College
- Frank Phillips College
- Galveston College
- Grayson College
- Hill College
- Houston Community College
- Howard College
- Kilgore College
- Laredo College
- Lee College
- Lone Star College System
  - Lone Star College–CyFair
  - Lone Star College–Kingwood
  - Lone Star College–Montgomery
  - Lone Star College–North Harris
  - Lone Star College–Tomball
- McLennan Community College
- Midland College
- Navarro College
- North Central Texas College
- Northeast Texas Community College
- Odessa College
- Panola College
- Paris Junior College
- Ranger College
- San Jacinto College
- South Plains College
- South Texas College
- Southwest Texas Junior College
- Tarrant County College
- Temple College
- Texarkana College
- Texas Southmost College
- Texas State Technical College
- Trinity Valley Community College
- Tyler Junior College
- Vernon College
- Victoria College
- Weatherford College
- Western Texas College
- Wharton County Junior College

=== Utah ===
- Salt Lake Community College
- Snow College
- Utah State University Eastern

=== Vermont ===
- Community College of Vermont

=== Virginia ===
- Blue Ridge Community College
- Central Virginia Community College
- Dabney S. Lancaster Community College
- Danville Community College
- Eastern Shore Community College
- Germanna Community College
- J. Sargeant Reynolds Community College
- Brightpoint Community College
- Laurel Ridge Community College
- Mountain Empire Community College
- New River Community College
- Northern Virginia Community College
- Patrick & Henry Community College
- Paul D. Camp Community College
- Piedmont Virginia Community College
- Rappahannock Community College
- Southside Virginia Community College
- Southwest Virginia Community College
- Thomas Nelson Community College
- Tidewater Community College
- Virginia Highlands Community College
- Virginia Western Community College
- Wytheville Community College

=== Washington ===
- Bates Technical College
- Bellevue College
- Bellingham Technical College
- Big Bend Community College
- Cascadia College
- Centralia College
- Clark College
- Clover Park Technical College
- Columbia Basin College
- Community Colleges of Spokane
  - Spokane Community College
  - Spokane Falls Community College
- Edmonds College
- Everett Community College
- Grays Harbor College
- Green River College
- Highline College
- Lake Washington Institute of Technology
- Lower Columbia College
- Olympic College
- Peninsula College
- Pierce College
- Renton Technical College
- Seattle Colleges District
  - North Seattle College
  - Seattle Central College
  - South Seattle College
- Shoreline Community College
- Skagit Valley College
- South Puget Sound Community College
- Tacoma Community College
- Walla Walla Community College
- Wenatchee Valley College
- Whatcom Community College
- Yakima Valley College

=== West Virginia ===
- Blue Ridge Community and Technical College
- BridgeValley Community and Technical College
- Eastern West Virginia Community and Technical College
- Mountwest Community and Technical College
- New River Community and Technical College
- Pierpont Community and Technical College
- Potomac State College of West Virginia University
- Southern West Virginia Community and Technical College
- West Virginia Northern Community College
- West Virginia University at Parkersburg

=== Wisconsin ===
- College of Menominee Nation
- Lac Courte Oreilles Ojibwa Community College
- Milwaukee Career College
- University of Wisconsin System - branch campuses
  - UW–Eau Claire – Barron County
  - UW–Green Bay, Manitowoc Campus
  - UW–Green Bay, Marinette Campus
  - UW–Green Bay, Sheboygan Campus
  - UW–Milwaukee at Waukesha (defunct)
  - UW–Oshkosh, Fox Cities Campus (defunct)
  - UW–Platteville Baraboo Sauk County
  - UW–Stevens Point at Marshfield
  - UW–Stevens Point at Wausau
  - UW–Whitewater at Rock County
- Wisconsin Technical College System
  - Blackhawk Technical College
  - Chippewa Valley Technical College
  - Fox Valley Technical College
  - Gateway Technical College
  - Lakeshore Technical College
  - Madison Area Technical College
  - Mid-State Technical College
  - Milwaukee Area Technical College
  - Moraine Park Technical College
  - Nicolet Area Technical College
  - Northcentral Technical College
  - Northeast Wisconsin Technical College
  - Southwest Wisconsin Technical College
  - Waukesha County Technical College
  - Western Technical College
  - Wisconsin Indianhead Technical College

=== Wyoming ===
- Casper College
- Central Wyoming College
- Eastern Wyoming College
- Laramie County Community College
- Northern Wyoming Community College District
  - Gillette College
  - Sheridan College
- Northwest College
- Western Wyoming Community College
