= List of smoke-free colleges and universities =

This is a list of colleges and universities identified as having smoke-free campus policies. They are those institutions of higher learning that have entirely prohibited smoking on campus, including all indoor areas and the majority of outdoor grounds. Campuses that allow smoking only in very remote outdoor areas are marked with an asterisk. The list also includes those institutions that have enacted such policies and whose date of implementation is pending. This list is not exhaustive, and campus policies may change over time. The list does not include those schools with designated smoking areas near buildings or walkways.

Smoke-free campus policies are introduced for a variety of health, safety, and environmental reasons, and may form part of wider tobacco-control measures in higher education. Many institutions have expanded their policies to include tobacco-free rules that also restrict smokeless tobacco and, in some cases, electronic nicotine-delivery systems, hookah use, or cannabis smoking and vaping.

The adoption and scope of smoke-free or tobacco-free campus policies vary internationally. In some countries, colleges and universities implement these policies voluntarily, while in others they are shaped by provincial, state, or national legislation. Large numbers of campuses in regions such as the United States and Canada have implemented comprehensive smoke-free or tobacco-free rules, with details provided in the regional sections below.

In some countries, smoke-free campus policies have become a common element of wider tobacco-control measures in higher education. As of 1 July 2025, the American Nonsmokers’ Rights Foundation identified at least 2,581 campus sites in the United States and tribal jurisdictions with 100% smoke-free policies covering all indoor and outdoor areas; of these, 2,166 were also 100% tobacco-free, and many additionally prohibited e-cigarette use, hookah, and smoking or vaping cannabis on campus.

A 2022 national status report by the Canadian Cancer Society identified 100 university and college campuses in Canada with 100% smoke-free policies as of 13 August that year, many of which also explicitly restrict the use of cannabis, hookah and e-cigarettes.

Studies report that the implementation and enforcement of smoke-free and tobacco-free campus policies can vary across institutions, reflecting differences in campus settings and administrative approaches.

== Background ==
Smoke-free campus policies are typically introduced as part of institutional or college health, safety, and environmental strategies aimed at reducing exposure to second-hand smoke and limiting tobacco use in campus communities. Public health agencies commonly distinguish between “smoke-free” policies, which prohibit the smoking of combustible products, and “tobacco-free” policies, which also restrict smokeless tobacco and, increasingly, electronic nicotine-delivery systems. Some institutions and jurisdictions additionally include prohibitions on hookah, heated-tobacco products, and the smoking or vaping of cannabis.

According to the American Nonsmokers' Rights Foundation, as of 1 July 2025, there were at least 2,581 U.S. and tribal college and university campus sites with 100% smokefree policies. Of the sites included in those policies, 2,166 were 100% tobacco-free, 2,271 prohibited the use of e-cigarette, 1,226 prohibited the use of hookah, 602 prohibited marijuana smoking or vaping, and 651 also included prohibiting smoking in personal vehicles located on campus in the policy rules.

nternational and national public-health organizations note that the development of campus policies is influenced by factors such as institutional governance, legal requirements, communication strategies, enforcement practices, and the availability of cessation support services. Assessments by agencies including the United States Centers for Disease Control and Prevention and the World Health Organization have reported substantial variation in the design and implementation of smoke-free and tobacco-free rules across countries, states, and individual institutions.

Research on policy effects indicates that comprehensive smoke-free or tobacco-free campus measures are associated with reductions in smoking prevalence, cigarette consumption, and exposure to second-hand smoke among students and staff, although results differ across settings. Several reviews also note that some campuses report increases in electronic-cigarette use following the adoption of smoke-free policies, reflecting changing patterns of nicotine consumption among young adults.

Studies examining implementation and compliance have identified challenges such as inconsistent enforcement, differences in administrative capacity, and limited awareness of policies among students and staff. These findings highlight the importance of ongoing communication, monitoring, and institutional support in maintaining effective smoke-free or tobacco-free environments.

== Asia ==
=== China ===
According to a study published in 2025, as of 31 December 2024, educational facilities (including universities) across China now operate under comprehensive statutory smoke-free status under subnational laws, even if campus-specific institutional policies aren’t detailed. Some specific educational institutions that operate under a smoke-free policy include:

- Peking University*
- Tsinghua University*
- China University of Political Science and Law*
- University of Science & Technology Beijing*
- Liaoning Finance and Trade College*

=== Hong Kong ===
Under Hong Kong’s Smoking (Public Health) Ordinance (Cap. 371), all schools, and specified educational establishments, including universities, post secondary colleges, and technical institutes are classified as non-smoking areas. Smoking is prohibited in all indoor outdoor and outdoor areas of these institutions, except where an exemption has been specifically provided by law. Guidance issued by the Department of Health outlines the implementation of comprehensive tobacco-control measures in educational settings, including signage, enforcement procedures, and campus-wide communication strategies.

Examples of Hong Kong higher-education institutions operating statutory no-smoking campuses include but are not limited to the following:

- The Hong Kong Polytechnic University
- The University of Hong Kong
- The Hong Kong University of Science and Technology
- The Hong Kong Academy for Performing Arts
- Chu Hai College of Higher Education
- City University of Hong Kong
- Hong Kong Baptist University
- The Education University of Hong Kong (formerly The Hong Kong Institute of Education)
- Hong Kong Shue Yan University
- Lingnan University
- Hong Kong Metropolitan University (formerly The Open University of Hong Kong)
- The Chinese University of Hong Kong

=== India ===
- JSS Academy of Higher Education & Research (JSS AHER)

=== Indonesia ===
- Faculty of Public Health Diponegoro University
- Universitas Airlangga (Surabaya, East Java)

=== Jordan ===
- Jadara University

=== Macau ===
- University of Macau*
- Macao Polytechnic University

=== Philippines ===
- University of Santo Tomas
- De La Salle University – Dasmariñas
- Mapúa University - Makati and Intramuros Campuses
- Manuel S. Enverga University Foundation (MSEUF)
- Saint Louis University (SLU), Baguio, Philippines
- Polytechnic University of the Philippines (Santa Rosa Campus)

=== United Arab Emirates ===
- HCT Dubai Men's College
- Sorbonne University Abu Dhabi
- America University of Sharjah
- Abu Dhabi University

=== Yemen ===
- Lebanese International University

== Africa ==
A number of universities in Africa have introduced campus-wide smoke-free policies as part of institutional health and environmental initiatives. The following institutions have published formal policies indicating that smoking is prohibited across their campuses:

=== Algeria ===
- University of El Oued (Martyr Hama Lakhdar University of El Oued)

=== Egypt ===
- Badr University, Cairo (BUC)
- Heliopolis University
- Kafrelsheikh University
- British University, Egypt (BUE)

=== Ghana ===
- University of Cap Coast

=== South Africa ===
- University of Western Cape (South Africa)

== Oceania ==
=== Australia ===
- Australian Catholic University
- Australian National University
- Charles Sturt University
- Curtin University
- Deakin University
- Edith Cowan University
- Federation University Australia
- Griffith University
- La Trobe University
- Macquarie University
- Monash University
- Murdoch University
- University of Notre Dame Australia
- Queensland University of Technology
- RMIT University
- Swinburne University of Technology
- University of Adelaide
- University of Canberra
- University of Melbourne
- University of New South Wales
- University of South Australia
- University of Southern Queensland
- University of Technology Sydney
- University of Sydney
- University of Western Australia
- University of Wollongong
- Victoria University, Australia
- Western Sydney University

=== New Zealand ===
- University of Auckland
- University of Waikato
- Massey University
- Victoria University of Wellington
- University of Otago
- University of Canterbury
- Unitec

== Europe ==
=== Finland ===
Finland’s tobacco legislation and official summaries explicitly list universities and vocational facilities as smoke-free places.

- University of Helsinki*
- University of Eastern Finland
- University of Turku

=== France ===
- EHESP School of public health, Rennes

=== The Netherlands ===
Since 2020, through the Dutch Tobacco Act, Dutch law prohibits smoking on the campuses of all educational institutions, including universities. Universities implement and publicize this via institutional policies.

- Tilburg University
- Radboud University
- Vrije Universiteit Amsterdam

=== Ireland ===
- National University of Ireland
- University College Dublin
- University of Limerick
- Athlone Institute of Technology

=== Italy ===
- University of Milano-Bicocca

=== Holy See ===
- Pontifical Lateran University

=== United Kingdom ===
As of 2025, the UK does not have a single national university or educational establishment smoke-free law. However, universities each adopt their own policies. The following institutions have adopted smoke-free or tobacco-free campus policies:

- Imperial College London
- King's College London
- Northumbria University*
- University of Bradford*
- University of Leeds
- University of the West of England – Frenchay Campus
- University of Warwick
- Teesside University – Darlington Campus
- Teesside University – Middlesbrough Campus

=== Turkey ===
- Bilkent University

== Americas ==
Smoke-free or tobacco-free campus policies in the Americas vary across countries and jurisdictions, reflecting differences in institutional decisions, legal requirements, and national tobacco-control frameworks. In some areas, colleges and universities adopt such policies voluntarily, while in others they are shaped by states, provincial, or federal legislation.

=== Canada ===
Many Canadian universities and colleges have implemented campus-wide smoke-free or tobacco-free policies as part of institutional health and environmental measures. According to a national status report published by the Canadian Cancer Society, at least 100 post-secondary campuses across the country had implemented 100% smoke-free policies as of 13 August 2022, with many also prohibiting vaping, hookah use and the smoking or vaping of cannabis. Subsequent summaries have reported continued expansion of such policies. Inclusion in this list is based on individual institutional policies, which may vary in scope and implementation.

==== Alberta ====
- Ambrose University
- Bow Valley College
- Burman University
- Concordia University of Edmonton
- Grande Prairie Regional College
- NorQuest College
- Northern Alberta Institute of Technology
  - Southern Alberta Institute of Technology
- The King's University

==== British Columbia ====
- Douglas College
- Kwantlen Polytechnic University
- Langara College
- Trinity Western University
- University of the Fraser Valley

==== Manitoba ====
- Canadian Mennonite University
- Manitoba Institute of Trades and Technology
- Providence University College
- Red River College
- University of Manitoba, Bannatyne
- University of Winnipeg

==== New Brunswick ====
- Collège communautaire du Nouveau-Brunswick, Edmundston
- Crandall University
- Kingswood University

==== Newfoundland and Labrador ====
- College of the North Atlantic
- Marine Institute
- Memorial University of Newfoundland

==== Nova Scotia ====
- Acadia University
- Dalhousie University
- NSCAD University
- Saint Mary's University
- University of King's College

==== Ontario ====
- Algonquin College
- Centennial College
- Fanshawe College
- George Brown College
- Humber College
- Lambton College
- Loyalist College
- McMaster University
- Mohawk College
- Redeemer University
- St. Lawrence College
- Saint Paul University
- Sheridan College
- University of Guelph
- University of Ontario Institute of Technology
- University of Toronto (3 campuses)
- University of Western Ontario
- Wilfrid Laurier University

==== Prince Edward Island ====
- Holland College
- Maritime Christian College
- University of Prince Edward Island

==== Quebec ====
- Ahuntsic College
- Bart College
- Cégep André-Laurendeau
- Cégep Beauce-Appalaches
- Cégep de Drummondville
- Cégep de l'Abitibi-Témiscamingue
- Cégep de Matane
- Cégep de la Gaspésie et des Îles
- Cégep de l'Outaouais
- Cégep de Rimouski
- Cégep de Rivière‐du‐Loup
- Cégep de Sainte-Foy
- Cégep de Saint-Jérôme
- Cégep de Sherbrooke
- Cégep de Sorel-Tracy
- Cégep de Trois-Rivières
- Cégep de Victoriaville
- Cégep du Vieux Montréal
- Cégep Édouard-Montpetit
- Cégep Garneau
- Cégep Limoilou
- Cégep régional de Lanaudière
- Cégep Saint-Laurent
- Champlain Regional College, Saint-Lambert, Quebec
- College Jean-de-Brébeuf
- College of Maisonneuve
- College of Rosemont
- Collégial International Sainte-Anne
- Dawson College
- John Abbott College
- Vanier College

==== Saskatchewan ====
- Carlton Trail Regional College
- Millar College
- University of Regina

==== Yukon ====
- Yukon College

=== United States ===
In the United States, smoke-free or tobacco-free policies are implemented through a combination of institutional action and state or territorial legislation. Several states and territories have enacted laws requiring all public colleges and universities to prohibit smoking or tobacco use on campus. According to the United States Centers for Disease Control and Prevention, by 2017 Arkansas, Illinois, Iowa, Louisiana, and the Northern Mariana Islands had adopted such legislation, resulting in smoke-free or tobacco-free status across public institutions within those jurisdictions. National monitoring organizations continue to report growth in the number of campuses adopting comprehensive smoke-free or tobacco-free rules. As of 1 July 2025, there are at least 2,581 100% smoke-free campus sites in the U.S., of which 2,166 are 100% tobacco-free.

==== Alabama ====
- Auburn University
- Auburn University at Montgomery
- Calhoun Community College
- Central Alabama Community College (3 campuses)
- Coastal Alabama Community College (11 campuses)
- Concordia College Alabama
- Faulkner University
- Heritage Christian University
- Huntingdon College
- J.F. Drake State Comm & Tech College (2 campuses)
- Judson College (Alabama)
- Miles College (restricted tobacco use on campus)
- Northwest-Shoals Community College (2 campuses)
- Oakwood University
- Snead State Community College (2 campuses)
- Southern Union State Community College (3 campuses)
- Stillman College
- Talladega College
- Troy University – Alabama Campuses (4 campuses)
- Tuskegee University
- University of Alabama
- University of South Alabama
- Wallace Community College

==== Alaska ====
- Wayland Baptist University (Anchorage, Alaska) (2 campuses)
- University of Alaska Anchorage
- University of Alaska Fairbanks
- University of Alaska Southeast
- Alaska Bible College
- Alaska Bible Institute
- Alaska Christian College
- Alaska Pacific University

==== Arizona ====
- A.T. Still University – Mesa
- University of Arizona
- Arizona State University
- Benedictine University – Mesa
- Embry–Riddle Aeronautical University, Prescott effective August 1, 2013
- Maricopa Community Colleges
  - Chandler-Gilbert Community College (3 campuses)
  - Estrella Mountain Community College (3 campuses)
  - GateWay Community College (3 campuses)
  - Glendale Community College (2 campuses)
  - Mesa Community College (3 campuses)
  - Paradise Valley Community College (2 campuses)
  - Phoenix College (4 campuses)
  - Rio Salado College (8 campuses)
  - Scottsdale Community College
  - South Mountain Community College
- Northern Arizona University
- Arizona Western College (10 campuses)

==== Arkansas ====
In accordance with Act 743, all public and state-supported institutions are smoke-free campus-wide as a result of the Arkansas Clean Air on Campus Act of 2009.

- Arkansas Northeastern College
- Arkansas State University Mid-South
- Arkansas State University – Beebe (2-Year College System) (3 campuses)
- Arkansas State University-Main Campus (2 campuses)
- Arkansas State University-Mountain Home (2-year campus)
- Arkansas State University-Newport (3 campuses)
- Arkansas Tech University
- Black River Technical College
- College of the Ouachitas
- Cossatot Community College of the Univ. of Arkansas
- East Arkansas Community College
- Henderson State University
- National Park College
- North Arkansas College (4 campuses)
- Northwest Arkansas Community College (6 campuses)
- Ouachita Baptist University
- Ozarka College (4 campuses)
- Phillips Community College (3 campuses)
- Pulaski Technical College (6 campuses)
- Rich Mountain Community College
- Shorter College
- South Arkansas Community College
- Southeast Arkansas College
- Southern Arkansas University
- Southern Arkansas University Tech
- University of Arkansas – Fayetteville
- University of Arkansas – Fort Smith
- University of Arkansas at Little Rock
- University of Arkansas at Monticello
- University of Arkansas at Pine Bluff
- University of Arkansas – Batesville
- University of Arkansas – Hope (2 campuses)
- University of Arkansas – Morrilton
- University of Arkansas Criminal Justice Institute
- University of Central Arkansas
- University of the Ozarks

==== California ====
- American River College (Los Rios) to take effect on all campuses by 2016
- Bakersfield College (3 campuses)
- Berkeley City College
- Cabrillo College*
- California State University, Dominguez Hills
- California State University, Fullerton
- California State University, Long Beach
- California State University, Los Angeles
- California State University, Northridge
- California State University San Marcos
- Cañada College*
- Cedars-Sinai Medical Center
- Cerritos College
- Chabot College*
- Chapman University
- College of San Mateo*
- College of the Redwoods (6 campuses)
- Contra Costa College*
- Cosumnes River College (2 campuses)
- Cuyamaca Community College
- Cypress College
- De Anza College*
- Diablo Valley College (2 campuses)
- East Los Angeles College (designated smoking areas)
- El Camino College
- Folsom Lake College (3 campuses)
- Foothill College*
- Fresno Pacific University
- Fullerton College
- Glendale Community College (California)
- Golden West College*
- Grossmont Community College
- Imperial Valley College
- Keck Hospital of USC
- Laney College
- Las Positas College*
- Loma Linda University
- Long Beach City College (designated smoking areas)
- Los Angeles City College
- LAC+USC Medical Center
- Los Angeles Harbor College
- Los Angeles Trade Technical College (designated smoking areas)
- Los Medanos College*
- Merritt College
- Mesa College
- MiraCosta College
- Mission College*
- Monterey Peninsula College*
- Moorpark College*
- Moreno Valley College
- Northeastern University – Silicon Valley Campus
- Northwest University – Sacramento Campus
- Ohlone College* (2 campuses)
- Oxnard College*
- Palomar College (6 campus)
- Pasadena City College* (4 campuses)
- Pierce College*
- Point Loma Nazarene University
- Reedley College
- Riverside City College (3 campuses)
- Riverside Community College*
- Sacramento City College
- Saint Mary's College of California
- San Diego City College
- San Diego Mesa College
- San Diego Miramar College*
- San Francisco State University*
- San Joaquin Delta College*
- San Jose City College*
- San Jose State University
- Santa Ana College*
- Santa Barbara City College (3 campuses)
- Santa Clara University (2 campuses)
- Santa Monica College*
- Santa Rosa Junior College
- Santiago Canyon College*
- Sierra College (4 campuses)
- Simpson University
- Skyline College*
- Solano Community College
- Sonoma State University
- Southwestern College*
- Springfield College (California)
- Stanford University Medical School
- Unitek College (Fremont, Sacramento, Concord, San Jose)
- University of California to take effect on all campuses by 2014
  - University of California, Berkeley
  - University of California, Los Angeles
  - University of California, Davis
  - University of California, Irvine
  - University of California, Merced
  - University of California, Riverside
  - University of California, San Diego
  - University of California, San Francisco
  - University of California, Santa Barbara
  - University of California, Santa Cruz
  - University of California Medical Center campuses
- University of San Francisco*
- University of Southern California
- West Los Angeles College (designated smoking areas)
- West Valley-Mission Community College*
- Woodland Community College
- Yuba College

==== Colorado ====
- Colorado Christian University
- Colorado Mountain College
- Colorado State University
- Columbia College (Colorado)
- Denver College of Nursing
- Naropa University*
- Northeastern Junior College
- University of Colorado Anschutz Medical Campus
- University of Colorado Boulder
- University of Denver*

==== Connecticut ====
- Southern Connecticut State University*
- Gateway Community College
- Hartford Community College
- Quinebaug Valley Community College
- Quinnipiac University – North Haven Campus
- Norwalk Community College*
- Rensselaer Polytechnic Institute, Hartford
- University of New Haven
- Yale University
- University of Connecticut Health Center
- Central Connecticut State University*
- Post University

==== Delaware ====
- Delaware State University (3 campuses)
- Delaware Technical Community College
- Springfield College (Delaware extension campus)
- Widener University Delaware School of Law

==== District of Columbia ====
- American University effective August 1, 2013
- George Washington University* effective September 2013
- Georgetown University (designated smoking areas)
- Georgetown University Medical Center. The Medstar part (but, not the GU part) is posted as smoke free both indoors and outdoors.

==== Florida ====
- Adventist University of Health Sciences
- Barry University
- Bethune–Cookman University
- Broward College (12 campuses)
- Charlotte Technical College
- Columbia College – Jacksonville & Orlando Campuses
- Daytona State College (7 campuses)
- Edward Waters University
- Embry-Riddle Aeronautical University, Daytona Beach
- Flagler College
- Florida Atlantic University
- Florida Gulf Coast University
- Florida International University
- Florida SouthWestern State College
- Florida State College at Jacksonville
- Florida State University
- Gulf Coast State College
- Hillsborough Community College
- Hodges University
- Johnson & Wales University – North Miami Campus
- Lynn University
- Miami Dade College (8 campuses)
- Nova Southeastern University
- Pensacola Christian College
- Santa Fe College (5 campuses)
- South Florida State College (4 campuses)
- Springfield College (Florida extension campus)
- State College of Florida, Manatee–Sarasota
- Stetson University
- St. Petersburg College (11 campuses)
- Troy University – Florida Sites (5 campuses)
- University of Central Florida
- University of Florida
- University of Florida Academic Health Center/Shands
- University of Miami Medical School
- University of South Florida
  - Sarasota-Manatee
  - St. Petersburg
  - University of South Florida Health
- University of Tampa
- Valencia College
- Warner University

==== Georgia ====
- Abraham Baldwin Agricultural College
- Albany State University
- Albany Technical College
- Armstrong State University
- Athens Technical College
- Augusta Technical College
- Augusta University
- Berry College
- Coastal Pines Technical College
- College of Coastal Georgia
- Columbus Technical College
- Dalton State College*
- Darton State College
- East Georgia College*
- Emory University
- Gainesville College
- Georgia Highlands College
- Georgia Northwestern Technical College
- Georgia Piedmont Technical College
- Georgia Southern University
- Georgia State University
- Gordon State College
- Gwinnett Technical College
- Lanier Technical College
- Kennesaw State University
- Medical College of Georgia
- Mercer University
- Morehouse School of Medicine
- North Georgia College & State University*
- North Georgia Technical College
- Oconee Fall Line Technical College
- Ogeechee Technical College
- Oglethorpe University
- Philadelphia College of Osteopathic Medicine, GA Campus
- Piedmont University
- Savannah State University
- Shorter University
- Southeastern Technical College
- Southern Regional Technical College
- Spelman College
- Troy University – Georgia Sites
- University of Georgia
- University of North Georgia
- University of West Georgia
- University System of Georgia
- Valdosta State University

==== Guam ====
- Guam Community College
- University of Guam

==== Hawaii ====
- Brigham Young University-Hawaii
- Kapiʻolani Community College

==== Idaho ====
- Boise State University
- Brigham Young University–Idaho
- Carrington College, Boise
- College of Southern Idaho
- College of Western Idaho (4 campuses)
- Idaho State University (4 campuses)
- Northwest Nazarene University
- University of Idaho

==== Illinois ====
All state-supported institutions in Illinois must be smoke-free (including the use of e-cigarettes), in compliance with the Illinois Smoke Free Campus Act, effective July 1, 2015.

- Aurora University
- Benedictine University (2 campuses)
- Blessing-Rieman College of Nursing and Health Sciences
- Carl Sandburg College
- Chicago State University
- City Colleges of Chicago
- College of DuPage
- College of Lake County
- Columbia College – Crystal Lake Campus
- Danville Area Community College
- Dominican University (Illinois)
- East St. Louis Community College Center
- Eastern Illinois University (4 campuses)
- Elgin Community College
- Governors State University
- Greenville University
- Hannibal-LaGrange University
- Heartland Community College
- Illinois Central College
- Illinois Eastern Community Colleges (4 campuses)
- Illinois State University
- Illinois Valley Community College
- Indiana Institute of Technology – Illinois Campuses (2 campuses)
- John A. Logan College
- John Wood Community College
- Joliet Junior College (6 campuses)
- Judson University
- Kankakee Community College
- Kaskaskia College
- Kishwaukee College
- Lake Land College
- Lewis and Clark Community College
- Lincoln Land Community College
- McHenry County College
- Moody Bible Institute
- Moraine Valley Community College
- Morton College
- North Central College
- Northeastern Illinois University (5 campuses)
- Oakton Community College
- Olivet Nazarene University
- Parkland College
- Prairie State College
- Rend Lake College
- Richland Community College
- Rock Valley College
- Rush University
- Saint Xavier University
- Sauk Valley Community College
- Shawnee Community College
- South Suburban College (2 campuses)
- Southeastern Illinois College
- Southern Illinois University Carbondale
- Southern Illinois University Edwardsville
- Southwestern Illinois College
- Spoon River College
- Triton College
- University of Illinois at Chicago
- University of Illinois at Urbana–Champaign
- Waubonsee Community College
- Western Illinois University (2 campuses)
- Wheaton College
- William Rainey Harper College (3 campuses)

==== Indiana ====
- Ancilla College*
- Anderson University
- Associated Mennonite Biblical Seminary
- Ball State University
- Bethel University
- Crossroads Bible College
- Earlham College*
- Franklin College
- Goshen College
- Grace College
- Holy Cross College
- Huntington University
- Indiana University*
  - Indiana University Bloomington*
  - Indiana University East
  - Indiana University Kokomo
  - Indiana University Northwest
  - Indiana University South Bend
  - Indiana University Southeast
  - Indiana University – Purdue University Columbus*
  - Indiana University – Purdue University Fort Wayne*
  - Indiana University – Purdue University Indianapolis
- Indiana Tech
- Indiana Wesleyan University
- ITT Technical Institute
- Ivy Tech Community College of Indiana
- Manchester University (2 campuses)
- Marian University (Indiana)
- Martin University
- Purdue University*
- Purdue University Calumet
- Purdue University North Central
- Saint Mary-of-the-Woods College
- Taylor University
- Trine University*
- University of Evansville
- University of Indianapolis
- University of Notre Dame*
- University of Saint Francis
- Valparaiso University
- Vincennes University*

==== Iowa ====
In accordance with the Iowa Smokefree Air Act, all public and private institutions are smoke-free by law.

- Allen College
- Briar Cliff University
- Buena Vista University
- Central College (Iowa)
- Clarke University
- Coe College
- Cornell College
- Des Moines Area Community College (12 campuses)
- Des Moines University
- Divine Word College
- Dordt University
- Drake University
- Eastern Iowa Community College District (4 campuses)
- Ellsworth Community College (2 campuses)
- Emmaus University
- Faith Baptist Bible College & Theological Seminary
- Graceland University (3 campuses)
- Grand View University
- Grinnell College
- Hamilton Technical College
- Hawkeye Community College (10 campuses)
- Indian Hills Community College (3 campuses)
- Iowa Central Community College
- Iowa Lakes Community College (5 campuses)
- Iowa State University
- Iowa Valley Grinnell
- Iowa Wesleyan University
- Iowa Western Community College
- Kirkwood Community College
- Loras College
- Luther College (Iowa)
- Maharishi University of Management
- Marshalltown Community College
- Mercy College of Health Sciences
- Morningside University
- Mount Mercy University
- North Iowa Area Community College
- Northeast Iowa Community College (2 campuses)
- Northwest Iowa Community College
- Northwestern College
- Palmer College of Chiropractic
- Simpson College
- Southeastern Community College (4 campuses)
- Southwestern Community College (3 campuses)
- St. Ambrose University
- St. Luke's College
- University of Dubuque
- University of Iowa (2 campuses)
- University of Phoenix – Des Moines Campus
- Upper Iowa University
- Vatterott College
- Waldorf University
- Wartburg College
- Wartburg Theological Seminary
- Western Iowa Tech Community College (6 campuses)
- William Penn University

==== Kansas ====
- Barclay College
- Butler Community College (6 campuses)
- Central Christian College of Kansas
- Emporia State University
- Flint Hills Technical College
- Fort Hays State University
- Friends University (3 campuses)
- Highland Community College (6 campuses)
- Kansas Christian College
- Kansas City Kansas Community College (3 campuses)
- Kansas State University (3 campuses)
- Kansas Wesleyan University
- Labette Community College
- Manhattan Christian College
- MidAmerica Nazarene University
- Pittsburg State University
- Pratt Community College
- Salina Area Technical College
- University of Kansas (all campuses)
- University of Kansas Medical Center campuses

==== Kentucky ====
- Ashland Community and Technical College
- Bellarmine University
- Big Sandy Community & Tech College (4 campuses)
- Bluegrass Community and Technical College
- Campbellsville University (6 campuses)
- Elizabethtown Community and Technical College (11 campuses)
- Gateway Community and Technical College (4 campuses)
- Hazard Community and Technical College (5 campuses)
- Henderson Community College (3 campuses)
- Hopkinsville Community College
- Indiana Institute of Technology – KY Campuses (2 campuses)
- Indiana Wesleyan University – Kentucky Sites (3 campuses)
- Jefferson Community and Technical College (6 campuses)
- Kentucky State University
- Kentucky Wesleyan College
- Madisonville Community College Health Sciences Campus
- Maysville Community and Technical College
- Morehead State University
- Northern Kentucky University
- Owensboro Community and Technical College
- Southcentral Kentucky Community and Technical College (6 campuses)
- Southeast Kentucky Community and Technical College (5 campuses)
- Spalding University
- St. Catharine College*
- Thomas More University
- Transylvania University
- Union Commonwealth University
- University of Kentucky, Lexington Campus
- University of Louisville
- University of Pikeville
- West Kentucky Community and Technical College (7 campuses)

==== Louisiana ====
- All public institutions effective August 1, 2014
- Baton Rouge Community College (8 campuses)
- Bossier Parish Community College
- Central Louisiana Technical Community College (7 campuses)
- Delgado Community College (7 campuses)
- Dillard University
- Fletcher Technical Community College (5 campuses)
- Franciscan Missionaries of Our Lady University
- Grambling State University
- Louisiana Delta Community College
- Louisiana State University of Alexandria
- Louisiana State University Eunice
- Louisiana State University Shreveport
- Louisiana Tech University
- Loyola University New Orleans (2 campuses)
- LSUHSC New Orleans
- LSUHSC Shreveport
- LSU New Orleans, effective August 1, 2014 (then known as University of New Orleans)
- Nicholls State University
- Northshore Technical Community College (3 campuses)
- Northwest Louisiana Technical College (5 campuses)
- Northwestern State University (4 campuses)
- Nunez Community College
- River Parishes Community College (2 campuses)
- South Central Louisiana Technical College
- Southeastern Louisiana University
- Southern University
- South Louisiana Community College
- SOWELA Technical Community College, Lake Charles (2 campuses)
- Tulane University (6 campuses)
- University of Louisiana at Monroe
- Xavier University of Louisiana

==== Maine ====
- Colby College*
- Husson University (3 campuses)
- Kennebec Valley Community College
- Maine Maritime Academy
- Saint Joseph's College of Maine
- Southern Maine Community College (2 campuses)
- University of Maine, Orono
- University of Maine at Augusta
- University of Maine at Farmington
- University of New England (2 campuses)
- University of Southern Maine
- University of Maine at Presque Isle
- York County Community College

==== Maryland ====
- Anne Arundel Community College (7 campuses)
- Carroll Community College
- Cecil College (2 campuses)
- Chesapeake College
- Frederick Community College*
- Frostburg State University
- Garrett College
- Goucher College
- Hagerstown Community College
- Harford Community College
- Howard Community College
- Maryland Bible College and Seminary
- Montgomery College
- Morgan State University
- Prince George's Community College (4 campuses)
- Salisbury University
- Towson University
- Washington Adventist University
- University of Maryland*

==== Massachusetts ====
- Bentley University
- Berkshire Community College (2 campuses)
- Boston University Medical Campus
- Bridgewater State University
- Bristol Community College
- Cape Cod Community College
- Emmanuel College
- Harvard Medical School
- Harvard School of Dental Medicine
- Harvard School of Public Health
- John F. Kennedy School of Government (Harvard University)
- Holyoke Community College
- Massachusetts College of Liberal Arts
- Massachusetts Maritime Academy
- Middlesex College (formerly Middlesex Community College)
- North Shore Community College
- Northeastern University
- Northern Essex Community College (7 campuses)
- Quinsigamond Community College (3 campuses)
- Salem State University
- Simmons University
- Springfield College
- Tufts University (Boston campus)
- University of Massachusetts Amherst
- University of Massachusetts Boston
- University of Massachusetts Medical School
- University of Massachusetts Lowell
- Westfield State University*
- Worcester Polytechnic Institute*
- Worcester State University*

==== Michigan ====
- Alpena Community College
- Andrews University
- Baker College
- Bay College
- Calvin University*
- Central Michigan University
- Davenport University
- Delta College
- Eastern Michigan University
- Finlandia University
- Glen Oaks Community College
- Grand Rapids Community College
- Great Lakes Christian College
- Henry Ford Community College
- Hope College
- Indiana Institute of Technology – Michigan Campus
- Jackson College
- Kalamazoo Valley Community College
- Kirtland Community College
- Lansing Community College
- Michigan State University (tobacco-free campus policy took effect in August 2016)
- Michigan Technological University
- Mid-Michigan Community College (2 campuses)
- Monroe County Community College
- Montcalm Community College
- Moody Theological Seminary
- Mott Community College
- Muskegon Community College
- North Central Michigan College
- Northern Michigan University
- Northwestern Michigan College
- Northern Michigan University
- Oakland Community College
- Oakland University
- Saginaw Valley State University*
- Schoolcraft College
- Spring Arbor University
- St. Clair County Community College (6 campuses)
- University of Michigan
- Wayne State University
- Washtenaw Community College
- Western Michigan University

==== Minnesota ====
- Argosy University (Twin Cities campus)
- Bemidji State University
- Bethel University
- Century College
- College of St. Scholastica
- Cook County Higher Education at The North Shore Campus
- Dakota County Technical College
- Itasca Community College
- Lake Superior College
- Leech Lake Tribal College
- Mesabi Range Community and Technical College
- Minnesota State University, Mankato
- Minnesota State University Moorhead
- Minnesota West Community and Technical College
- North Central University
- Northwest Technical College
- Northwestern College
- Northwestern Health Sciences University
- Rainy River Community College
- Rasmussen College (Moorhead and St. Cloud campuses)
- Rasmussen College (Waite Park campus)*
- Ridgewater College
- Riverland Community College
- Rochester Community and Technical College
- South Central College
- Southwest Minnesota State University
- St. Catherine University
- St. Cloud State University
- St. Cloud Technical and Community College
- St. Olaf College
- University of Minnesota Twin Cities
- University of Minnesota Crookston
- University of Minnesota Duluth
- Winona State University

==== Mississippi ====
- Mississippi State University (all campuses)
- Belhaven University
- Blue Mountain Christian University
- Coahoma Community College
- Copiah-Lincoln Community College
- Delta State University
- East Mississippi Community College, Scooba and Mayhew
- Hinds Community College at Utica
- Holmes Community College (4 campuses)
- Itawamba Community College
- Jones County Junior College
- Mississippi Christian University
- Mississippi Gulf Coast Community College
- Northeast Mississippi Community College
- University of Mississippi (Oxford campus)
- University of Southern Mississippi

==== Missouri ====
- Cox College
- Drury University
- East Central College
- Evangel University
- Fontbonne University
- Hannibal-LaGrange University
- Harris–Stowe State University
- Jefferson College
- Kansas City University of Medicine and Biosciences
- Lindenwood University
- Maryville University
- Metropolitan Community College
- Missouri Western State University
- North Central Missouri College
- Northwest Missouri State University
- Ozarks Technical Community College
- St. Louis College of Pharmacy
- St. Charles Community College
- St. Louis Community College
- St. Louis University
- St. Louis University Medical Center
- State Fair Community College
- Truman State University
- University of Missouri
- University of Missouri – St. Louis
- Washington University in St. Louis
- Webster University
- Westminster College

==== Montana ====
- Montana State University
- Montana Tech of the University of Montana
- University of Montana
- University of Montana Western

==== Nebraska ====
- Bellevue University
- Clarkson College
- College of Saint Mary
- Creighton University
- Mid-Plains Community College
- Nebraska Methodist College
- Union Adventist University
- University of Nebraska at Kearney
- University of Nebraska–Lincoln
- University of Nebraska Medical Center
- University of Nebraska Omaha
- York University

==== Nevada ====
- Nevada State University (tobacco-free as of 25 August 25, 2025)
- University of Nevada, Las Vegas (since 15 August 2022)
- University of Nevada, Reno
- Western Nevada College, Carson City & Fallon (as of 14 August 2017)

==== New Hampshire ====
- University of New Hampshire, Manchester*
- Nashua Community College, Nashua*
- Granite State College
- Great Bay Community College, Portsmouth and Rochester*
- Plymouth State University
- White Mountains Community College, Berlin and Littleton*

==== New Jersey ====
- Bergen Community College
- Berkeley College
- Brookdale Community College
- Burlington County College
- Camden County College
- County College of Morris
- Essex County College
- Gloucester County College
- Middlesex College
- Middlesex County College
- Montclair State University
- Ocean County College
- Raritan Valley Community College*
- Rowan College at Burlington County
- Salem Community College
- Sussex County Community College

==== New Mexico ====
- University of New Mexico*
- Navajo Technical College

==== New York ====
- Barnard College
- Berkeley College
- Binghamton University
- Broome Community College
- Canisius University
- Cayuga Community College
- Cazenovia College
- City University of New York
- Clinton Community College
- College of Saint Rose
- Columbia University (designated smoking areas)
- Corning Community College
- City University of New York
  - CUNY School of Medicine
  - CUNY School of Public Health
- D'Youville University
- Davis College
- Erie Community College
- Maria College
- Mohawk Valley Community College, Utica & Rome
- Monroe County Community College
- New York University
- Pace University
- Paul Smith's College
- Rensselaer Polytechnic Institute
- Rochester Institute of Technology
- Rockland Community College
- Sage Colleges
- St. Francis College
- State University of New York
  - Jamestown Community College
  - State University of New York at Buffalo
  - State University of New York at Canton
  - State University of New York at Cortland
  - State University of New York at Plattsburgh (Tobacco use on the campus is restricted to a limited number of designated parking lots.)
  - State University of New York College of Optometry
  - State University of New York at Oswego
  - State University of New York Upstate Medical University
  - Suffolk County Community College
  - University at Buffalo School of Medicine and Biomedical Sciences
- Stony Brook University Hospital
- Syracuse University
- Union Graduate College
- University of Rochester Medical Center
- Vassar College
- Wells College
- Westchester Community College

==== North Carolina ====
- Appalachian State University*
- Asheville-Buncombe Technical Community College
- Barber-Scotia College
- Beaufort County Community College
- Belmont Abbey College*
- Bennett College
- Blue Ridge Community College
- Brunswick Community College
- Cabarrus College of Health Sciences
- Campbell University*
- Cape Fear Community College
- Carolinas College of Health Sciences
- Catawba College*
- Catawba Valley Community College
- Central Carolina Community College
- Central Piedmont Community College
- Chowan University*
- Cleveland Community College
- Coastal Carolina Community College
- College of The Albemarle
- Davidson County Community College
- Durham Technical Community College
- East Carolina University Health Sciences Campus
- ECPI University (Greensboro campus)
- Edgecombe Community College
- Elon University*
- Forsyth Technical Community College
- Gardner-Webb University
- Gaston College
- Greensboro College
- Guilford Technical Community College
- Halifax Community College
- Haywood Community College
- High Point University
- Laurel University
- Lees–McRae College
- Lenoir Community College
- Lenoir–Rhyne University
- Louisburg College
- Mayland Community College
- Mitchell Community College
- Montgomery Community College
- Montreat College
- Peace College
- Pfeiffer University
- Piedmont Community College
- Pitt Community College*
- Randolph Community College
- Richmond Community College
- Roanoke-Chowan Community College
- Rockingham Community College
- Rowan-Cabarrus Community College
- South Piedmont Community College
- Southeastern Community College
- Southwestern Community College
- Stanly Community College
- Surry Community College
- University of North Carolina at Chapel Hill*
- Vance-Granville Community College
- Wake Technical Community College
- Wayne Community College
- Western Piedmont Community College
- Wilkes Community College
- Wingate University
- Winston-Salem State University*

==== North Dakota ====
- Bismarck State College
- Dakota College at Bottineau
- Dickinson State University
- University of Jamestown
- Lake Region State College
- Mayville State University
- Medcenter One College of Nursing
- Minot State University
- North Dakota State College of Science
- North Dakota State University
- Trinity Bible College
- University of Mary
- University of North Dakota
- Valley City State University

==== Northern Mariana Islands ====
All public and private institutions are smoke-free by law.

==== Ohio ====
- Ashland University College of Nursing
- Bowling Green State University (designated smoking areas)
- Case Western Reserve University
- Cedarville University
- Cuyahoga Community College
- Heidelberg University
- Hocking College
- Kent State University
- Lorain County Community College
- Malone University
- Miami University
- Mount Carmel College of Nursing
- Mount Vernon Nazarene University
- Northeast Ohio Medical University
- Notre Dame College of Ohio
- Ohio Christian University
- Ohio Dominican University
- Owens Community College
- Sinclair Community College
- Ohio State University
- Ohio State University College of Medicine
- University of Akron
- University of Cincinnati
- University of Toledo Health Science Campus
- Wright State University

==== Oklahoma ====
All public institutions are tobacco-free by law.

- Oklahoma Baptist University
- Oklahoma Christian University
- Oklahoma City University
- Southeastern Oklahoma State University
- Southern Nazarene University
- St. Gregory's University
- Bacone College

==== Oregon ====
- Chemeketa Community College
- Corban University
- George Fox University
- Lane Community College*
- Mt. Hood Community College
- Multnomah University
- National University of Natural Medicine
- Northwest Christian University
- Oregon Coast Community College
- Oregon College of Oriental Medicine
- Oregon Health & Science University
- Oregon State University – Corvallis
- Pacific University Health Professions Campus
- Portland Community College (Cascade and Rock Creek campuses)
- Tillamook Bay Community College
- University of Oregon
- Walla Walla University – Portland
- Warner Pacific University
- University of Western States

==== Pennsylvania ====
- Baptist Bible College & Seminary
- Bucks County Community College*
- Butler County Community College
- Carnegie Mellon University (designated smoking areas)
- Cheyney University of Pennsylvania
- Community College of Beaver County
- Community College of Philadelphia
- Delaware County Community College
- Drexel University
- Eastern University (since 1991, smokeless tobacco also prohibited)
- Fox Chase Cancer Center
- Keystone College*
- Lackawanna College
- La Salle University
- Lehigh Carbon Community College
- Luzerne County Community College
- Marywood University
- Montgomery County Community College
- Pennsylvania State University (from fall 2018)
- Philadelphia College of Osteopathic Medicine
- University of Pittsburgh (designated smoking areas)
- Reading Area Community College
- Salus University
- University of Pennsylvania
- University of the Sciences in Philadelphia
- Widener University

==== South Carolina ====
- Aiken Technical College
- Allen University
- Anderson University
- Benedict College
- Bob Jones University
- Central Carolina Technical College
- Charleston Southern University
- Claflin University
- Clemson University
- Clinton College
- Coker College
- College of Charleston
- Columbia International University
- Converse College
- Coastal Carolina University
- Denmark Technical College
- Francis Marion University
- Lander University
- Medical University of South Carolina
- Midlands Technical College
- North Greenville University
- Orangeburg–Calhoun Technical College
- Piedmont Technical College
- Presbyterian College
- Southern Wesleyan University
- Spartanburg Methodist College
- The Citadel, The Military College of South Carolina
- Tri-County Technical College
- University of South Carolina Aiken
- University of South Carolina Beaufort
- University of South Carolina Columbia
- University of South Carolina Salkehatchie
- University of South Carolina Sumter
- University of South Carolina Union
- University of South Carolina Upstate
- Voorhees University
- York Technical College

==== South Dakota ====
- Dakota State University
- Dakota Wesleyan University
- Mount Marty University
- Oglala Lakota College
- South Dakota School of Mines and Technology
- University of Sioux Falls
- University of South Dakota

==== Tennessee ====
- Austin Peay State University
- Belmont University
- Bryan College
- Chattanooga State Community College
- Dyersburg State Community College
- East Tennessee State University
- Freed–Hardeman University
- Lane College
- Lipscomb University
- Middle Tennessee State University
- Milligan University
- Tennessee Technological University
- University of Tennessee at Knoxville
- University of Tennessee at Martin
- Vanderbilt University

==== Texas ====
- Abilene Christian University
- Alamo Community College District
- Alvin Community College*
- Amarillo College
- Angelina College
- Austin Community College District
- Baylor University
- Blinn College
- Collin College
- Houston Christian University
- Huston–Tillotson University
- Lamar Institute of Technology
- Lone Star College-Kingwood*
- Midwestern State University
- Nelson University
- North Central Texas College
- Paul Quinn College
- St. Mary's University
- San Jacinto College – South Campus
- Stephen F. Austin State University
- Sul Ross State University
- Tarrant County College
- Texas Christian University
- Texas Southmost College
- Texas State University
- Texas Tech University Health Sciences Center
- Tyler Junior College
- University of North Texas
- University of Texas at Arlington
- University of Texas at Austin
- University of Texas at Brownsville
- University of Texas at Tyler
- University of Texas Rio Grande Valley
- University of Texas Health Science Center at Houston
- University of Texas Health Science Center at San Antonio
- Victoria College
- Weatherford College

==== Utah ====
- Brigham Young University
- LDS Business College
- University of Utah
- Utah Tech University
- Weber State University

==== Vermont ====
- University of Vermont
- University of Vermont Medical Center
- Vermont State University

==== Virginia ====
- Eastern Virginia Medical School
- Jefferson College of Health Sciences
- Liberty University
- Patrick Henry College
- Regent University
- Virginia commonwealth university
- Randolph-Macon College

==== Washington ====
- Clark College
- Corban University
- Everett Community College
- Green River Community College
- Lower Columbia College
- Northwest University
- Pacific Lutheran University
- Pierce College
- Seattle Pacific University
- Seattle University
- South Puget Sound Community College
- Walla Walla University
- Washington State University Spokane (Riverpoint campus)

==== West Virginia ====
- Marshall University Health Sciences Campus
- West Liberty University
- West Virginia Northern Community College
- West Virginia School of Osteopathic Medicine
- West Virginia University Health Sciences Campus

==== Wisconsin ====
- Alverno College
- Bellin College
- Carroll University
- Chippewa Valley Technical College
- Gateway Technical College
- Madison Area Technical College
- Marian University
- Medical College of Wisconsin
- Milwaukee Area Technical College
- Moraine Park Technical College
- Nicolet Area Technical College
- Northland College
- University of Wisconsin–Baraboo/Sauk County
- University of Wisconsin–Madison Health Sciences Campus
- University of Wisconsin–Milwaukee
- University of Wisconsin–Stevens Point
- University of Wisconsin–Stout
- Waukesha County Technical College
- Western Technical College
- Northwood Technical College
- Fox Valley Technical College
