= List of colleges and universities in Kentucky =

The following is a list of colleges and universities in the Commonwealth of Kentucky. Kentucky also has two early entrance to college programs, for academically gifted high school juniors and seniors, that allows the students to take college credits while finishing high school. They are the Craft Academy for Excellence in Science and Mathematics, and the Carol Martin Gatton Academy of Mathematics and Science.

== Public universities ==
| Institution | Endowment (2025) | Total students (2024) | Founded |
|---|---|---|---|
| Eastern Kentucky University | $107 million | 15,673 | 1906 |
| Kentucky State University | | 2,020 | 1886 |
| Morehead State University | $76.9 million | 8,791 | 1887 |
| Murray State University | $135 million | 10,020 | 1922 |
| Northern Kentucky University | $150.9 million | 15,347 | 1968 |
| University of Kentucky | $2.18 billion | 34,709 | 1865 |
| University of Louisville | $1.07 billion | 23,065 | 1798 |
| Western Kentucky University | $305.65 million | 16,291 | 1906 |
| Total | $4.04 billion | 125,916 | 8 |

== Private liberal arts colleges ==
- Alice Lloyd College
- Asbury University
- Bellarmine University
- Berea College
- Campbellsville University
- Centre College
- Georgetown College
- Kentucky Wesleyan College
- Lindsey Wilson University
- Midway University
- Spalding University
- Thomas More University
- Transylvania University
- Union Commonwealth University
- University of the Cumberlands
- University of Pikeville

== Private colleges and universities ==
- American National University
- Asbury Theological Seminary
- Beckfield College
- Boyce College
- Brescia University
- Clear Creek Baptist Bible College
- Frontier Nursing University
- Kentucky Christian University
- Kentucky Mountain Bible College
- Lexington Theological Seminary
- Lindsey Wilson University
- Louisville Bible College
- Louisville Presbyterian Theological Seminary
- Simmons College of Kentucky
- Southern Baptist Theological Seminary
- Sullivan University

== Kentucky Community and Technical College System ==
- Ashland Community and Technical College
- Big Sandy Community and Technical College
- Bluegrass Community and Technical College
- Elizabethtown Community and Technical College
- Gateway Community and Technical College
- Hazard Community and Technical College
- Henderson Community College
- Hopkinsville Community College
- Jefferson Community and Technical College
- Madisonville Community College
- Maysville Community and Technical College
- Owensboro Community and Technical College
- Somerset Community College
- Southcentral Kentucky Community and Technical College
- Southeast Kentucky Community and Technical College
- West Kentucky Community and Technical College

== Kentucky dental schools ==
- University of Kentucky College of Dentistry
- University of Louisville School of Dentistry

== Kentucky law schools ==
- Salmon P. Chase College of Law
- University of Kentucky College of Law
- University of Louisville School of Law

== Kentucky medical schools ==
- University of Kentucky College of Medicine
- University of Louisville School of Medicine
- University of Pikeville Kentucky College of Osteopathic Medicine

== Former institutions ==
- Caldwell Female College
- Daymar College
- Kentucky College for Women
- Lees College
- Mid-Continent University
- National College
- St. Catharine College
- Spencerian College
- Sue Bennett College
- Sullivan College of Technology and Design

== See also ==
- List of college athletic programs in Kentucky
- The Kentucky Council on Postsecondary Education
- Higher education in the United States
- Lists of American institutions of higher education
- List of recognized higher education accreditation organizations
