= Richard A. Bean =

American banker

Richard A. Bean is the past chair of the KCTCS Kentucky Community and Technical College System's Board of Regents.

In March 2009, he presided over the board's decision to eliminate tenure for new hires to the state's community college system. He supported the move by noting that it would allow greater flexibility in hiring and firing instructors as student demand varied.

Bean also led the board's decision to raise tuition for students while freezing salaries for faculty and staff in 2008. He defended the decision saying that "KCTCS is doing what the majority of households across that state are doing ... we are tightening our belts..."

In 2007, Bean responded to an outcry over the salary paid to the KCTCS system's president, Michael McCall, saying that McCall's $610,000 salary was "totally and absolutely justified."

Bean is a life director of the Home Builders Association of Kentucky. Now retired, he was a senior vice president of BB&T Bank and Chase Bank in Louisville.
