= Metropolitan Community =

Metropolitan Community can refer to:

- Metropolitan Community (Quebec)
  - Communauté métropolitaine de Québec
  - Montreal Metropolitan Community
- Metropolitan community of Brussels

== See also ==
- Metropolitan area
- Metropolitan Community Church
- Metropolitan Community College (disambiguation)
