= Metropolitan Community College =

Metropolitan Community College may refer to

- Metropolitan Community College (Nebraska), a three-campus public community college in Omaha, Nebraska
- Metropolitan Community College (Missouri), a network of five community colleges in Kansas City, Missouri
- Metropolitan Community College (Illinois), a community college in East St. Louis, Illinois from 1996 to 1998
