= North American Racing Academy =

Coordinates: 38.097°N 84.421°W

The North American Racing Academy (NARA) is an accredited college in Lexington, Kentucky. It offers the only college degree program in the United States focused on producing jockeys.

== History ==
Hall of Fame jockey and two-time Kentucky Derby winner (1987 and 1994) Chris McCarron is credited with the idea of the school's creation in 1988 after he addressed a school for professional riders during his time in Japan for the year's Japan Cup race. Chris McCarron played a hands-on role in the school until his retirement in December 2014. He continues to be involved in NARA providing a capstone class to the graduating class.

Many countries that have Thoroughbred racing require anyone applying for a jockey's license to have completed a course at a recognized school for jockeys, but the United States does not. In 2006, the North American Racing Academy was formed as part of the Bluegrass Community and Technical College, which is accredited by the Southern Association of Colleges and Schools.

While the program is the only college level program in the United States for jockeys, there are programs in racetrack management at the University of Louisville and the University of Arizona.

== Mission ==
The goal of the school is to provide the Thoroughrbed racing industry with a competent trained workforce. While initially focusing on jockey training and development, the school has expanded with the horseman pathway that provides graduates with the skills to work in training barns, farm management, and breeding operations. The mission statement is: "The mission of the North American Racing Academy is to develop and operate a world-class racing school that will provide students with the education, training and experience needed to become skilled in the art of race riding, proficient in the care and management of racehorses, and knowledgeable about the workings of the racing industry as a whole."

== Facilities ==
The equine part of the curriculum is taught at the Thoroughbred Training Center, and coursework is taught at the Bluegrass Community and Technical College (BCTC) in Lexington, Kentucky. The main offices of NARA are also located at the Thoroughbred Training Center, which is owned and operated by Keeneland.

== Curriculum ==
Coursework includes riding and horse care as well as with courses in nutrition, fitness, finance, communication, rules of racing, and technology. The students aren't allowed to bring their own horse, instead everyone rides retired Thoroughbred racehorses provided by the school. The program lasts two years and graduates are awarded an associate degree in Equine Science.
