= Randolph Early College High School =

American public school in North Carolina

Coordinates: 35°40′20″N 79°49′41″W

Randolph Early College High School is a non-traditional public high school in Randolph County, North Carolina, United States. It is located on the campus of Randolph Community College and is part of the Randolph County School System, based in Asheboro, North Carolina. Founded in 2005, RECHS requires dual enrollment at Randolph Community College as students pursue an Associate Degree. Students who are economically disadvantaged or belong to a racial minority are targeted by the school for enrollment. Extracurricular activities are limited and typically student-led due to the small student body and limited staff.
