= Kentucky Community and Technical College System =

Kentucky's system of community colleges

Kentucky Community and Technical College System (KCTCS)
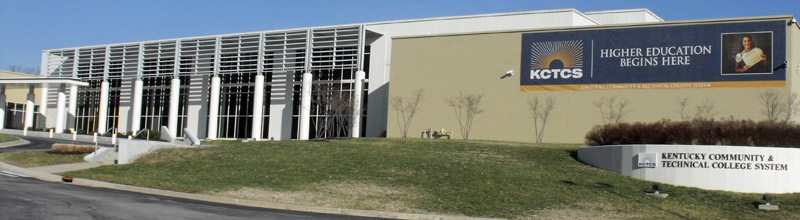
- Type: System of public community and technical colleges
- Established: 1997
- Endowment: $110.4 million (2025)
- President: Dr. Ryan Quarles
- Location: Versailles, Kentucky, United States
- Colors: Blue █ and Gold █
- Website: www.kctcs.edu

The Kentucky Community and Technical College System (KCTCS) is the system of public community and technical colleges in the U.S. state of Kentucky. It is headquartered in Versailles, Kentucky, and has 16 colleges with over 70 campuses. Programs offered include associate degrees; pre-baccalaureate education to transfer to a public 4-year institution; adult education, continuing and developmental education; customized training for business and industry; and distance learning. KCTCS was founded as part of the Postsecondary Improvement Act of 1997 (House Bill 1), signed by former Kentucky Governor Paul E. Patton, to create a new institution to replace the University of Kentucky's Community College System and the Kentucky Department of Education's network of technical schools. The Kentucky Fire Commission, a separate state entity responsible for training emergency responders, also became part of KCTCS at that time.

== History ==
In 1948, the University of Kentucky Northern Extension Center was founded in Covington. It is the unofficial beginning of the University of Kentucky Community College System—although this campus no longer operates as a community college, as it became a separate four-year institution in 1968 and is now known as Northern Kentucky University.

In June 1957, representing the Ashland Independent School District's Board of Education, and with the support of Governor Happy Chandler, Ashland Oil & Refining Company founder and CEO Paul G. Blazer presented a proposal to President Frank G. Dickey and the University of Kentucky Board of Trustees for the university to take over the day-to-day operations and curriculum of the nineteen-year-old Ashland [municipal] Junior College, creating the Ashland Center of the University of Kentucky as the second university extension center.

Details of the planned relationship were contained in the agreement signed by the Ashland Board of Education and the University of Kentucky Board of Trustees. By this agreement the university would provide a course of study and administration which would be comparable to that of the university at Lexington and for which the students would receive the same credit as the students in Lexington. The Ashland Board of Education was to provide the buildings, land, equipment and facilities. All other expenses, including teacher salaries were to be paid by the University of Kentucky.

With the continued support of Governor Chandler, President Dickey successfully expanded the program by developing University of Kentucky Extension Centers in Fort Knox (1958), Cumberland (1960), and Henderson (1960).

In 1960, newly elected Governor Bert Combs created the Governor's Commission on the Study of Public Higher Education to study the need for such a system. Headed by Otis C. Amis, of Lexington, the commission submitted its recommendations in November 1961, which included creating new community colleges for Prestonsburg, Hopkinsville, Somerset and the Hazard-Blackey area.

Authorized by the Kentucky General Assembly and signed by Governor Bert Combs on March 6, 1962, a mandate was placed upon the University of Kentucky to form a community college system. President Dickey had concerns of adequate legislative funding. In 1964, the board of trustees and newly elected UK President John W. Oswald implemented the legislation removing the system from the UK Division of Extended Programs and creating a separate UK Division of Community Colleges, changing the extension centers to community colleges in Covington, Ashland, Fort Knox, Cumberland, and Henderson; and creating Elizabethtown.

Veteran educator Ellis F. Hartford was named as Dean with Edsel Godbey named his assistant. Administratively, each college had a director who reported directly to Dean Hartford, who through President Oswald, reported to the UK Board of Trustees. Additionally, each college has a seven-member local advisory committee appointed for four-year terms by the governor.

In 1968, the UK Northern (Covington) Community College separated from the system and became an autonomous four-year College under the name Northern Kentucky State College.

== Member institutions ==
Location of KCTCS campuses. For colleges with multiple campuses, the flagship campus is labeled.

KCTCS includes the following community and technical colleges:

- Ashland Community and Technical College (Ashland)
- Big Sandy Community and Technical College (Paintsville, Prestonsburg, Pikeville, Hager Hill)
- Bluegrass Community and Technical College (Lexington, Danville, Lawrenceburg, Winchester, Georgetown)
- Elizabethtown Community and Technical College (Elizabethtown)
- Gateway Community and Technical College (Covington, Florence, Edgewood and Highland Heights)
- Hazard Community and Technical College (Hazard, Jackson, Hyden, Hindman)
- Henderson Community College (Henderson)
- Hopkinsville Community College (Hopkinsville)
- Jefferson Community and Technical College (three Louisville locations, plus Carrollton, Shelbyville, and Shepherdsville)
- Madisonville Community College (Madisonville, Central City)
- Maysville Community and Technical College (Maysville, Cynthiana, Morehead)
- Owensboro Community and Technical College (Owensboro)
- Somerset Community College (Somerset)
- Southcentral Kentucky Community and Technical College (Bowling Green)
- Southeast Kentucky Community and Technical College (Cumberland)
- West Kentucky Community and Technical College (Paducah)
