= East St. Louis Community College Center =

Coordinates: 38.620743°N 90.162279°W

East St. Louis Community College Center (ESLCCC) serves as host to Illinois community colleges operating satellite campuses in the city of East St. Louis, Illinois. Students can attend community college classes within their home community. ESLCCC is located at the East St. Louis Higher Education Campus in East St. Louis at 601 James R. Thompson Blvd.

== History and background ==
ESLCCC opened in January 1999, on the former campus of Metropolitan Community College. MCC had been closed by the Illinois Community College Board for irregularities in its operations. ESLCCC is operated by the Southern Illinois Collegiate Common Market, a consortium of five Southern Illinois community colleges and the Southern Illinois University Carbondale and Edwardsville campuses. The Center provides for classroom instruction from Southwestern Illinois College and Kaskaskia College.
