= Madisonville Community College =

Public college in Madisonville, Kentucky, US

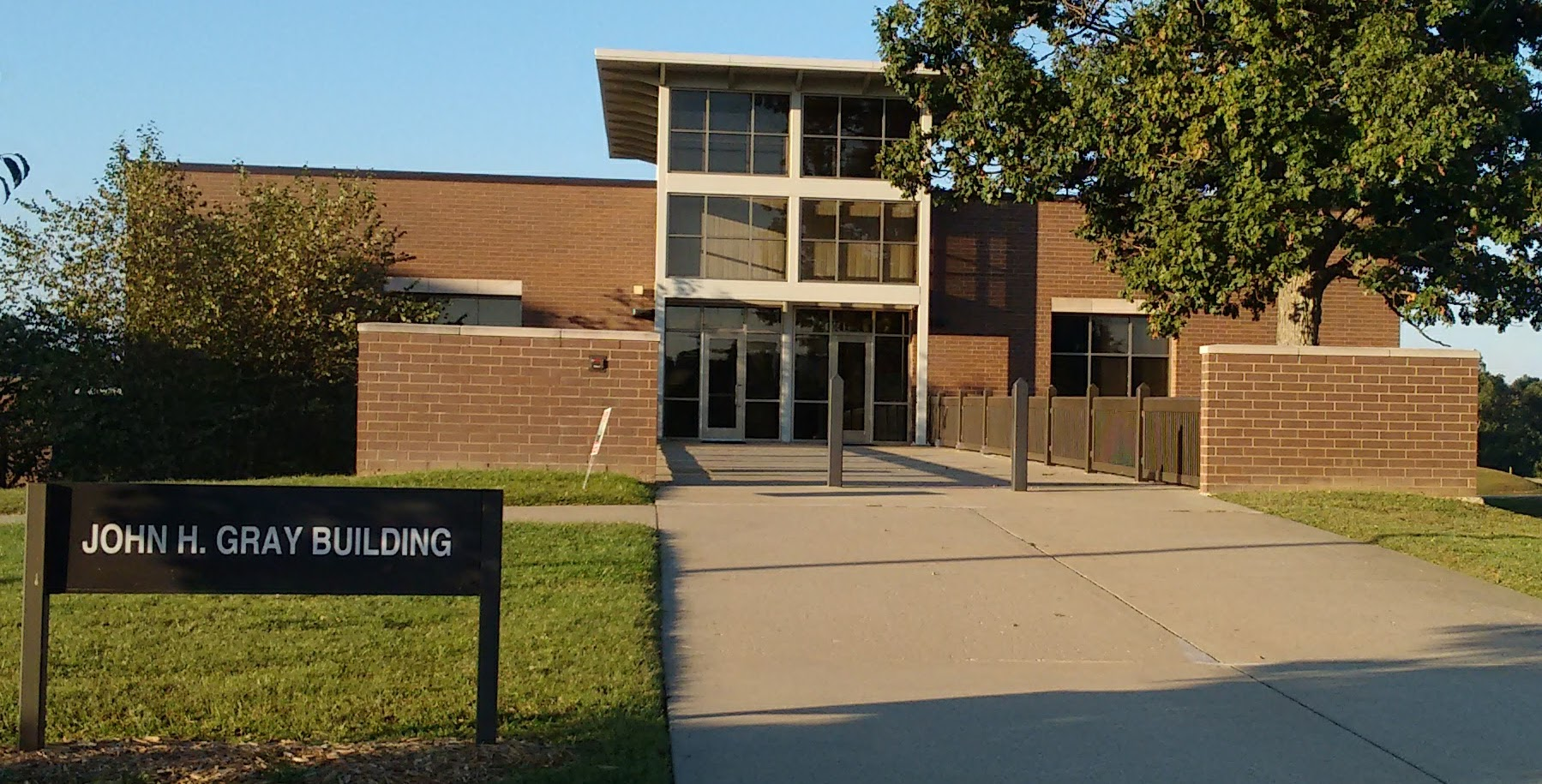
- The John H. Gray Building at Madisonville Community College
- Type: Public, two-year
- Established: 1968
- Affiliations: Kentucky Community and Technical College System
- President: Dr. Cynthia Kelley
- Faculty: 117
- Administrative staff: 127
- Students: 2700
- Location: Madisonville, Kentucky, United States; 37.3643°N 87.5131°W
- Colors: Navy █ and gold █
- Website: http://www.madisonville.kctcs.edu

Madisonville Community College (MCC) is a public community college in Madisonville, Kentucky. It is one of 16 two-year, open-admissions colleges of the Kentucky Community and Technical College System (KCTCS). MCC was originally established as a member of the University of Kentucky's Community College System in 1968. In 2001, the college consolidated with Madisonville Technical College, itself originally established in 1937 as the Madisonville Area Trade School. MCC offers associate degree programs, as well as technical diplomas and certificates, with the overall purpose of making postsecondary educational opportunities available to Kentucky's citizens and workforce. MCC is accredited by the Southern Association of Colleges and Schools (SACS). In 2011, it was ranked among the nation's top 10% of community colleges by the Aspen Institute.

== Service area ==
The primary service area of MCC includes:

- Caldwell County
- Crittenden County
- Hopkins County
- Muhlenberg County
- Webster County

== Campuses ==
MCC currently maintains four campus locations.

The North Campus is home to most of the college's administrative functions, the Loman C. Trover library, and the Divisions of Humanities, Natural Sciences, and Social Sciences. The North Campus consists of the John H. Gray Building, the Joe C. Davis Science and Technology Building, the Glema Mahr Center for the Arts, and the Learning Resource Center. Plans have been approved for the construction of a new facility on the North Campus: the Brown Badgett, Sr. Advanced Energy and Technology Building.

The Health Campus is home to the Divisions of Nursing and Allied Health. It is located adjacent to Baptist Health Madisonville, formerly The Trover Clinic and Regional Medical Center. The Health Campus consists of two buildings: the Hatley Building and the Academic Building.

The Technical Campus, formerly Madisonville Technical College, is home to the Division of Applied Technology and headquarters for the Adult Centers for Educational Excellence (ACE^{2}) adult education program. The Technical Campus is scheduled to be closed upon completion of the Brown Badgett, Sr. Advanced Energy and Technology Building.

The Muhlenberg Campus is located in Central City (Muhlenberg County). Completed in 2001, the Muhlenberg Campus serves students in Muhlenberg County, approximately 25% of MCC's total enrollment.

== Athletics ==
MCC had a men's basketball team called the Pacers from the late 1960s until 1979. The team played against other Kentucky community colleges, junior colleges, and Job Corps campuses. The team utilized local school gymnasiums for home games.
