= State Community College of East Saint Louis =

Coordinates: 38.620743°N 90.162279°W

State Community College of East Saint Louis (District 601) and its short-lived successor Metropolitan Community College (District 541) were two community college districts in East Saint Louis, Illinois in the late 20th century.

The State Community College of East Saint Louis was formed around 1969 by the Illinois General Assembly by Public Act No. 76–724 (1969 Ill. Laws 1489, 110 ILCS 805/2-12.1). Unlike other community colleges in Illinois, State Community College was formed as an "experimental" district controlled directly by the Illinois Community College Board and funded by the State of Illinois.

After a public referendum to abolish the State Community College, a replacement college district, Metropolitan Community College (District 541), was founded around 1995 with its own board of trustees. SCC's North Central accreditation was transferred to MCC effective July 1, 1996. That college and district was dissolved by the ICCB effective January 1, 1999, after the ICCB noted problems with financial and student enrollment reporting. A board member and the mayor of East St. Louis sued the ICCB over the dissolution, but their case was dismissed.

Its campus is now the East St. Louis Community College Center, operated by a consortium of community colleges and Southern Illinois University campuses.
