= Elizabethtown Community and Technical College =

Public college in Elizabethtown, Kentucky, US

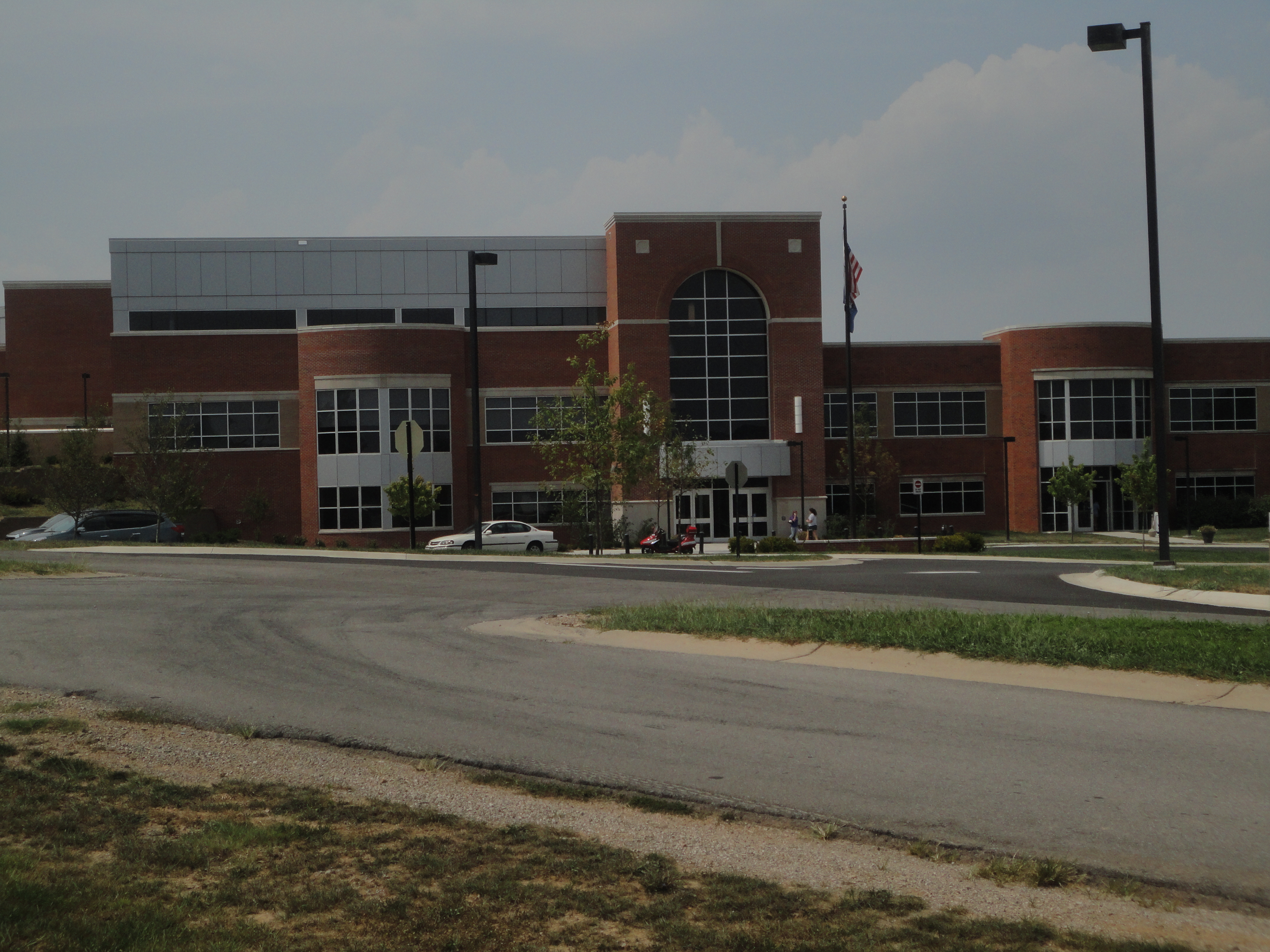
- Former names: Elizabethtown Community College, Elizabethtown Technical College
- Motto: Transforming Lives - Transforming Kentucky
- Type: Public community college
- Established: 2004
- Parent institution: Kentucky Community and Technical College System
- President: Juston Pate
- Provost: Telly Sellars
- Location: Elizabethtown, Kentucky, United States; 37°41′34.35″N 85°52′41.62″W
- Campus: multiple campuses
- Colors: Navy and Gold
- Website: elizabethtown.kctcs.edu

Elizabethtown Community and Technical College (ECTC) is a public community college in Elizabethtown, Kentucky. It is part of the Kentucky Community and Technical College System (KCTCS).

== History ==
It was formed by the consolidation of Elizabethtown Community College (est. 1964) and Elizabethtown Technical College (est. 1965) in 2004. ECTC is accredited by the Southern Association of Colleges and Schools (SACS).

In 1997, the Kentucky General Assembly passed the Postsecondary Education Improvement Act of 1997, separating Kentucky's community colleges from the University of Kentucky's Community College System and uniting them under a new entity, the Kentucky Community and Technical College System. This separation left ECC to operate for nearly a year and a half without formal accreditation, as the community colleges had previously received accreditation through their connection with the University of Kentucky. Once KCTCS was established, this oversight was corrected.

The Elizabethtown Japanese School (エリザベスタウン日本人補習校 Erizabesutaun Nihonjin Hoshūkō), a weekend Japanese program, held its classes at the college as of 2015.

== Campus ==
ECTC has four campuses. The main campus is located in Elizabethtown off the 31-W bypass. In addition there is a Fort Knox campus, a Springfield campus, and a Leitchfield campus. The technical college also offers seven off-campus locations where students of Hardin, and 11 surrounding counties can attend instructional classes.

== Service area ==
The primary service area of ECTC includes:

- Breckinridge County
- Green County
- Grayson County
- Hardin County
- LaRue County
- Marion County
- Meade County
- Nelson County
- Taylor County
- Washington County
