= Randolph Community College =

Public college in Asheboro, North Carolina, US

Coordinates: 35.6727°N 79.8285°W

- Logo
- Former names: Randolph Technical Institute (1965-1979); Randolph Technical College (1979-1988)
- Motto in English: "He who earns the honor will bear it."
- Type: Public community college
- Established: September 1962
- Parent institution: North Carolina Community College System
- Accreditation: Southern Association of Colleges and Schools
- President: Dr. Shah Ardalan
- Students: 7,526
- Location: 629 Industrial Park Avenue, Asheboro, North Carolina, 27205, United States
- Campus: 35 acres (14 ha)
- Colors: Blue, Silver, and Orange
- Mascot: Armadillos
- Website: www.randolph.edu

Randolph Community College is a public community college in Asheboro, Randolph County, North Carolina. It is part of the North Carolina Community College System.

== History ==
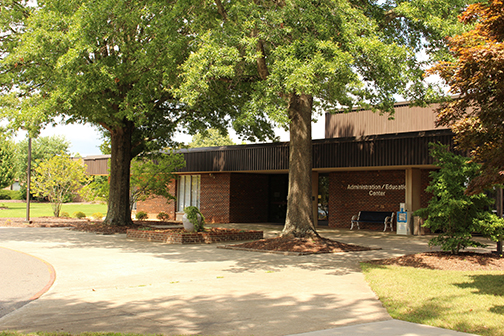
Randolph Community College

Randolph Community College opened in September 1962 as "Randolph Industrial Education Center", a joint city-county industrial education center, with 75 full-time students Merton H. Branson served as the school's first president.

The college became a member of the North Carolina Community College System in 1963 when the North Carolina legislature established a separate system of community colleges. It was known as Randolph Technical Institute from 1965 to 1979 and as Randolph Technical College from 1979 to 1988. It adopted the name Randolph Community College in 1988.

== Campus ==
The college is located in Asheboro, North Carolina, at the McDowell Road Exit off U.S. 220 just south of the U.S. 64/N.C. 49 interchange. The college draws from a population base of just over 27,353 in Asheboro and 145,322 countywide. The 35-acre (140,000 m^{2}) main campus in Asheboro contains eleven major buildings and the Richard Petty Education Center for its Automotive Systems and Autobody programs which opened in 2009.

Three satellite centers include the Archdale Center, serving residents in the northwest corner of Randolph County, the Randleman Center, and a 60-acre (240,000 m^{2}) Emergency Services Training Center located just outside Asheboro near Franklinville.

== Academics ==
Randolph Community College currently offers over 25 vocational and technical degrees, including a college transfer program and a continuing education program. The college is accredited by the Commission on Colleges of the Southern Association of Colleges and Schools. Annual enrollment for curriculum students is 3,767; annual enrollment for continuing education students is 7,526.

Randolph Community College also has a partnership with Randolph County School System which created the Randolph Early College High School in 2006. The Randolph Early College High School (RECHS) is an autonomous, nontraditional public high school involved in the North Carolina Innovative High Schools Program, and is located on the school's main campus. RECHS seeks to target economically disadvantaged, minority and first generation college-bound students.

== Traditions ==
The college's nickname is the Armadillos. Its original colors are blue and silver. Orange was added as an official color in 2009, with the introduction of a new logo. The Latin phrase on the college's seal translates as "He who earns the honor will bear it."
