= Henderson Community College =

Community college in Henderson, Kentucky, U.S.

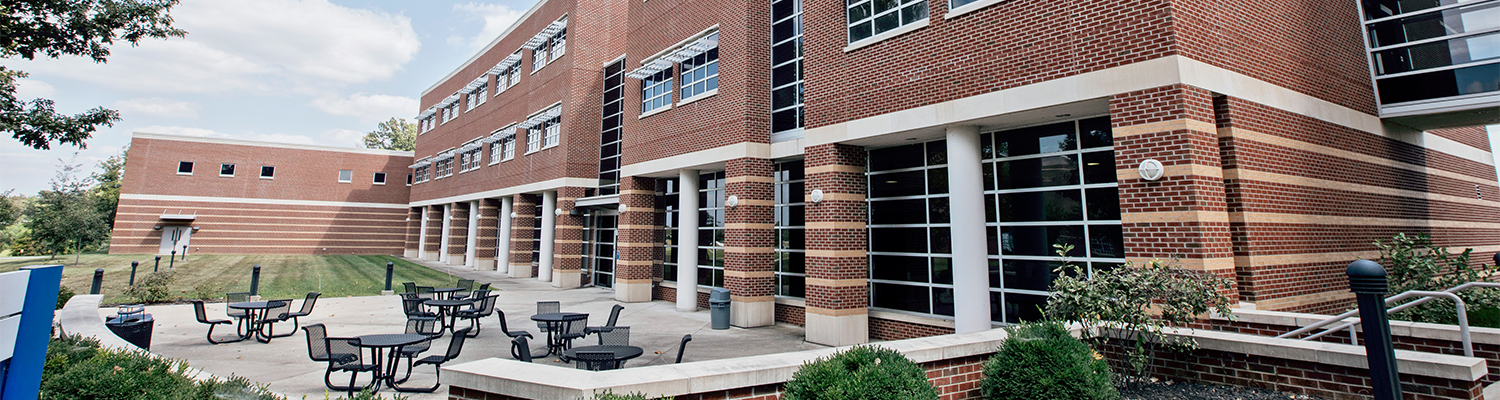
- HCC's Sullivan Technology Center
- Type: Public, 2 year, technical college
- Established: 1960
- Affiliations: Kentucky Community and Technical College System
- President: Dr. Jason D. Warren
- Students: 2000
- Location: Henderson, Kentucky, USA; 37.7971°N 87.6525°W
- Colors: Navy █ and Gold █
- Website: henderson.kctcs.edu

Henderson Community College (HCC) is a community college in Henderson, Kentucky. It is one of 16 two-year, open-admissions colleges of the Kentucky Community and Technical College System (KCTCS). It was established in 1960 under the leadership of the late Dr. Louis C. Alderman Jr., the first Director of the Northwest Extension of the University of Kentucky. The college became a charter member of the University of Kentucky's Community College System in 1964, changing its name to Henderson Community College. HCC became a member of KCTCS in 1998. HCC is accredited by the Southern Association of Colleges and Schools Commission on Colleges (SACSCOC) and most recently received reaffirmation for their accreditation through 2032.

== Service area ==
The primary service area of HCC includes:

- Henderson County
- Union County

HCC's enrollment is approximately 2,000 students. Approximately 60 percent are female.

== Campus ==
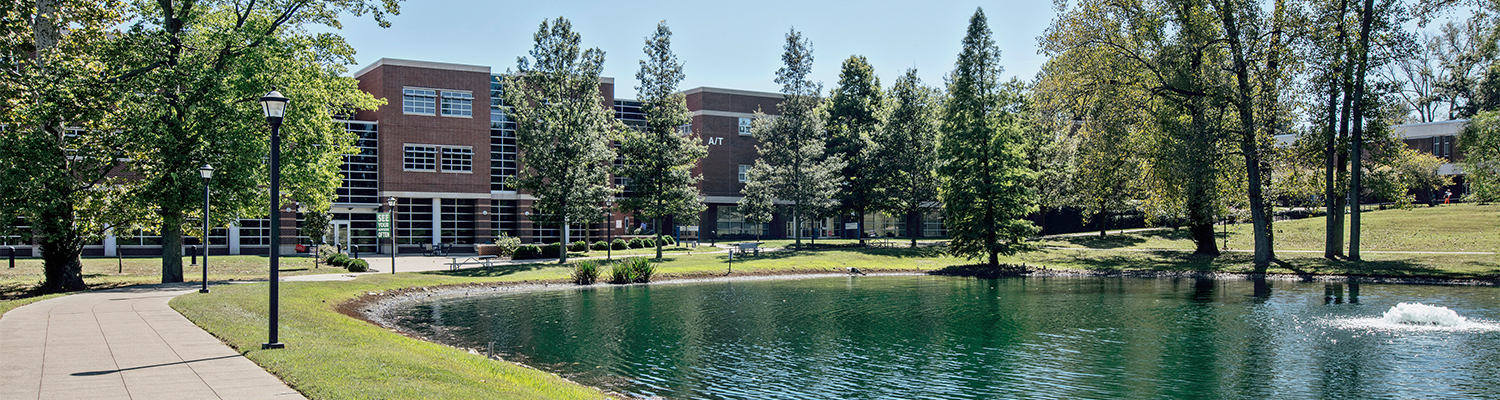
Henderson Community College campus

The Hecht S. Lackey Administration Building (the original building) houses administrative and faculty offices as well as classrooms, conference rooms, the Writing Center, and administrative offices for the Murray State University satellite location. HCC is a regional campus location for Murray State University. Hecht Lackey was the mayor of Henderson and a supporter of the college when it was established.

The Robert H. English Arts and Sciences Building houses classrooms, computer laboratories, conference rooms, the Computer and Information Technology program, the Business Administration program, the Interdisciplinary Early Childhood Education program, and offices for faculty and staff.

The Academic Technical Building provides classrooms, conference rooms, and laboratories for the clinical laboratory technician, medical assistant technology, nursing programs, Barnes & Noble Bookstore, HCC Food Service, offices for faculty and staff, and a student activities center.

The Sullivan Technology Center provides classrooms for many of the HCC technical programs, houses the HCC Start Center, and offers other student amenities.

The Joseph M. Hartfield Library houses tutoring, the Information Technology Department, the Distance Learning Department, faculty and staff offices, and classrooms.

The Preston Arts Center is home to McCormick Hall that accommodates up to 1000 people, dressing rooms, prop storage, green room, catering and concessions areas, gallery space for visual arts, public meeting rooms for general community and college use. It was announced in 2016 that the building would be renamed The Preston Arts Center from The Henderson Fine Arts Center.

== Programs and Certificates ==
Henderson Community College currently offers over 16 programs that allow students to earn a degree or certificate.

2+2 Education programs

Agriculture

Associate in Arts

Associate in Science

Business Administration

Computer and Information Technologies

Early Childhood Education

HCC FAME

Health Science Technology

Industrial Maintenance Technology

Medical Assisting

Medical Laboratory Technician

Nursing Assistant/Nurse Aide

Nursing

Pharmacy Technician

Welding Technology
