= Education in Kentucky =

Education in Kentucky includes elementary school (kindergarten through fifth grade in most areas), middle school (or junior high, sixth grade through eighth grade in most locations), high school (ninth through twelfth grade in most locations), and post-secondary institutions. Most Kentucky schools and colleges are accredited through the Southern Association of Colleges and Schools (SACS).

U.S. News ranks Kentucky 39th in education. In 2014, education in Kentucky was recorded at 45th in the United States based on the percentage of residents with a bachelor's degree, making it one of the least educated states in the US. In 1997 Kentucky was estimated to have 40% of working age adults with "low literacy skill levels...likely to impede their personal advancement". Education in Kentucky has been ranked 14th in educational affordability, 25th in K-12 attrition, and was named the 31st most intelligent state using a formula by Morgan Quitno Press (ahead of western states such as California, Nevada, Arizona and New Mexico).

After reforms beginning in 1990 assisted the state of Kentucky in making progress in the area of education. For example, the percentage of the population of Kentucky "lacking basic prose literacy skills" was 19% in 1992, with only five states having a higher percentage and by 2003, the percentage of Kentucky's population that lacked basic literary skills decreased to 12%, with twenty-one other states having higher rates. Lexington, Kentucky ranks 10th among US cities for having a high percent of the population awarded with a college degree or higher.

== History ==
=== Before 1865 ===
The frontier state was slow to build an educational system. In terms of K-12 and higher education, Kentucky consistently has ranked toward the bottom of national rankings in terms of funding, literacy levels, and student performance. Inside the state the Appalachian region always lagged. The Bluegrass area, however, built a strong reputation in higher education.

Education was a private matter in early Kentucky. There was no effort at the state or local level to start public schools. Wealthy families had their children tutored at home or at small local "academies" that charged tuition. Teachers were ill-prepared and focused on the 3 Rs—reading, writing and simple arithmetic.

A few private schools pre-dating Kentucky's statehood, such as the Salem Academy in Bardstown starting in 1794. Plans were put forward by 1800 but never put in operation. State funds that were allocated were diverted to other uses. Some towns set up charity schools for paupers but thy had a negative stigma attached. The full-fledged development of public education in the state did not materialize until after 1865.

There were a number of weaknesses in schools in Kentucky before 1865. During the Civil War most schools were disrupted or closed.

Education was not free or compulsory in Kentucky until the late 19th century. Most children, especially from poor or rural families, did not have the opportunity to attend school. Conditions were especially negative in the mountain districts. A few places did operate small charity schools for the poor. Public high schools were rare before the late 19th century. The more expensive private academies often covered a year or two beyond the 8th grade.

Teachers were poorly qualified. Most had graduated from 8th grade and take a year or two additional schooling in "normal school" programs. For women it was usually a brief interlude before marriage. For men it was a low status, low paying job with little future. The best teachers were often Presbyterian or Methodist ministers who taught a school attached to their church. They were already paid by their congregations and enjoyed high social status.

=== Since 1865 ===
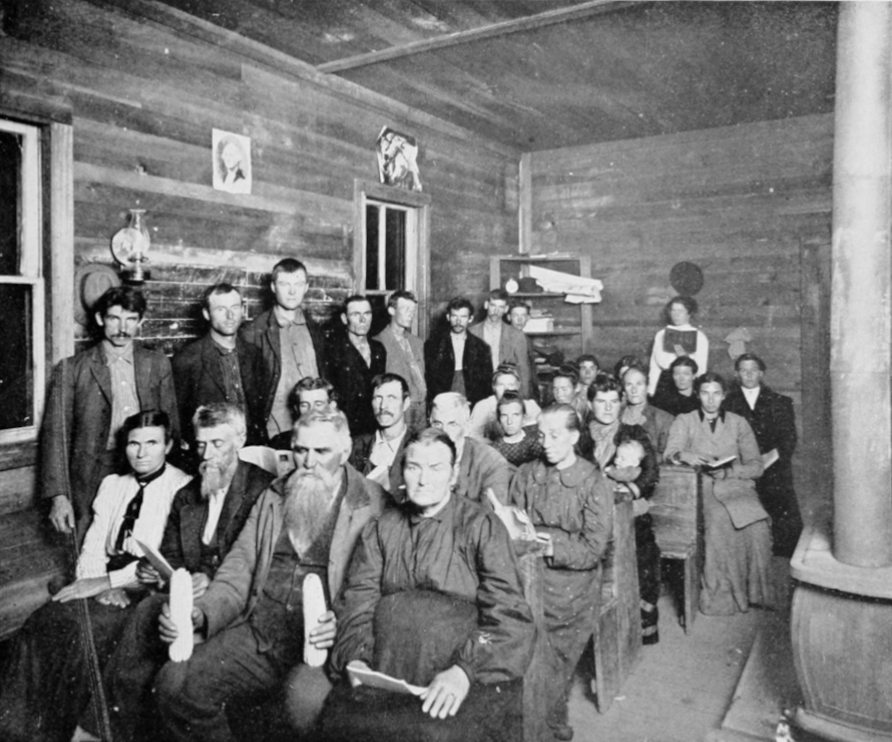
A "moonlight school"; night classes for illiterate adults in a local school in the mountains, c. 1916

The mountain districts had very low levels of literacy until well into the 20th century. Schools were scarce and offered only a few months of classes for a few years. The problem of adult illiteracy led to the introduction of adult literacy classes, typified by "Moonlight Schools" introduced by Cora Wilson Stewart in Rowan County 1911. In 1914, the state extended moonlight schools to all counties. In the following two years, 40,000 adults were taught to read and write.

=== Kentucky Education Reform Act (KERA) ===
In 1990, the Kentucky General Assembly passed the Kentucky Education Reform Act (KERA) in response to a ruling the previous year by the Kentucky Supreme Court that the commonwealth's education system was unconstitutional. The court mandated that the Legislature was to enact broad and sweeping reforms at a systemic level, statewide. The changes were so unpopular with Kentucky's teachers that some of them began to refer to KERA as the "Kentucky Early Retirement Act", though no spike in teacher attrition actually occurred following KERA's passage.

The law also created state-funded preschools with the Kentucky Preschool Program.

Before the Act, in 1990, per-students spending in poor districts was about $1,600 less per year than in rich areas. By 1997, the Act had decreased this gap to about $550. By 2016, the gap had crept back up to $1,400 per student.

=== Postsecondary Education Improvement Act of 1997 ===
The Kentucky General Assembly completely revamped higher education in the commonwealth with the passage of the Postsecondary Education Improvement Act of 1997, commonly referred to as House Bill 1 (HB1). HB1 mandated that the University of Kentucky become a Top 20 Public Research University by the year 2020. It also charged the University of Louisville to become a preeminent metropolitan research university over the same time frame.

The law created several new entities: Kentucky Community and Technical College System (KCTCS), Kentucky Virtual Campus (KYVC), Kentucky Virtual Library (KYVL), Kentucky Virtual Schools (KYVS),

==== Kentucky Community and Technical College System (KCTCS) ====
The Kentucky Community and Technical College System (KCTCS) governs the commonwealth's community and technical colleges. Previously, many of the commonwealth's community colleges had been part of the University of Kentucky's Community College System (which thus offered the same courses as those found at the University of Kentucky proper), while many of the technical colleges had been operated by the Workforce Cabinet.

==== Kentucky Virtual Campus (KYVC) ====
Originally designated the Commonwealth Virtual University (CVU) and then the Kentucky Virtual University, the Kentucky Virtual Campus (KYVC) is a single point of access to find online courses, degree programs and professional development education at Kentucky colleges, universities and state agencies. university.

==== Kentucky Virtual Library (KYVL) ====
The Kentucky Virtual Library supports the Kentucky Virtual University. the Kentucky Postsecondary Education Improvement Act of 1997 also created . KYVL provides the ability to search a number of databases of books and scholarly works, and provides help on research methods and techniques. KYVL is supposed to enhance the efficiency and cost-effectiveness of resource sharing among Kentucky libraries by utilizing current and emerging technologies and providing access to digital information resources at lower cost per unit through cooperative statewide licensing agreements.

==== Kentucky Virtual Schools (KYVS) ====
The Kentucky Department of Education and staffs of the KYVU and the KYVL created the Kentucky Virtual High School (KYVHS). The KYVHS launched in January 2000 to serve as a statewide educational provider of those highly specialized courses that the smaller, rural school districts could not afford to offer on a regular basis. The KYVHS is now part of the expanded initiative Kentucky Virtual Schools. The KYVS offers the extended curriculum offerings for schools that might not otherwise be available (e.g., foreign language instruction or Advanced Placement approved courses), and alternatives for credit recovery, additional instructional support for at-risk youth and teacher professional development.

==== Other Kentucky Virtual Education Providers ====
After the Kentucky Virtual High School launched, other state agencies approached the Kentucky Virtual University to partner with the Council on Postsecondary Education create their own online learning portals:

- Kentucky Adult Education launched in 2001 the nation's first fully online Kentucky Virtual Adult Education portal for adult learners and for adult educators' professional development.
- The Kentucky Education Professional Standards Board partnered with the KYVU, KYVL and KVHS to create Kentucky Educators.org which offers professional development opportunities for Kentucky teachers, counselors, staff and administrators.
- A collaboration between GEAR UP Kentucky, the KVHS and the KYVU, KYVC4K12.org launched in 2003 as an e-learning portal for K-12 students and their educational guardians seeking self-paced, not-for-credit learning opportunities.

=== Subsequent initiatives ===
In March 2013, Governor Steve Beshear signed a bill into law that ultimately led to the mandatory school age for the entire state rising to 18 from its then-current 16. Under the new law, local school boards had the power to decide whether to increase their dropout age. If more than 55% of the state's districts (96 out of 174 at the time of the bill's passage) did so, the change would become mandatory statewide within four years of the threshold being met. By mid-July 2013, the required number of districts had raised their dropout ages, meaning that all districts had to do the same no later than 2017–18.

== K-12 ==
The Kentucky Board of Education is responsible for the development, coordination, and implementation of K-12 education in each of the commonwealth's 172 school districts. In the 2018–19 school year there were 648,369 students enrolled at 1,466 Kentucky public schools, which employed a total of 42,024 public school teachers. For the same academic year, approximately 19,634 students were homeschooled.

=== The Kentucky Commonwealth Diploma ===
In order to motivate Kentucky high schoolers to take a more demanding curriculum, the Kentucky Board of Education began awarding the Commonwealth Diploma in 1987. The Commonwealth curriculum required that the student take four Advanced Placement courses (one English, one science or math, one foreign language, and one elective) and sit for the Advanced Placement exam in at least three of the four areas (and receive at least an 8 combined total score). Students whose combined scores on any three Advanced Placement exams met or exceeded a given threshold are eligible to have their registration fees for those exams refunded. The program was discontinued following the 2011–2012 school year.

=== Kentucky Educational Excellence Scholarship (KEES) ===
In 1998, the Kentucky General Assembly voted to utilize some of the profits generated by the state lottery to fund the Kentucky Educational Excellence Scholarship. The program was designed both to encourage high school students to take a pre-college level curriculum while in high school and to encourage them to pursue higher education in the commonwealth after graduation.

To be eligible, students must attain a grade point average of 2.5 or higher in a rigorous curriculum (which in most high schools is the honors or college prep level) defined by the Kentucky Council on Postsecondary Education (CPE), and attend college at an eligible institution in the Commonwealth of Kentucky. The actual amount of the award is based on a combination of the student's grade point average and score on the ACT. The scholarship is renewable for four years, provided the student maintains eligibility.

== Colleges and universities ==
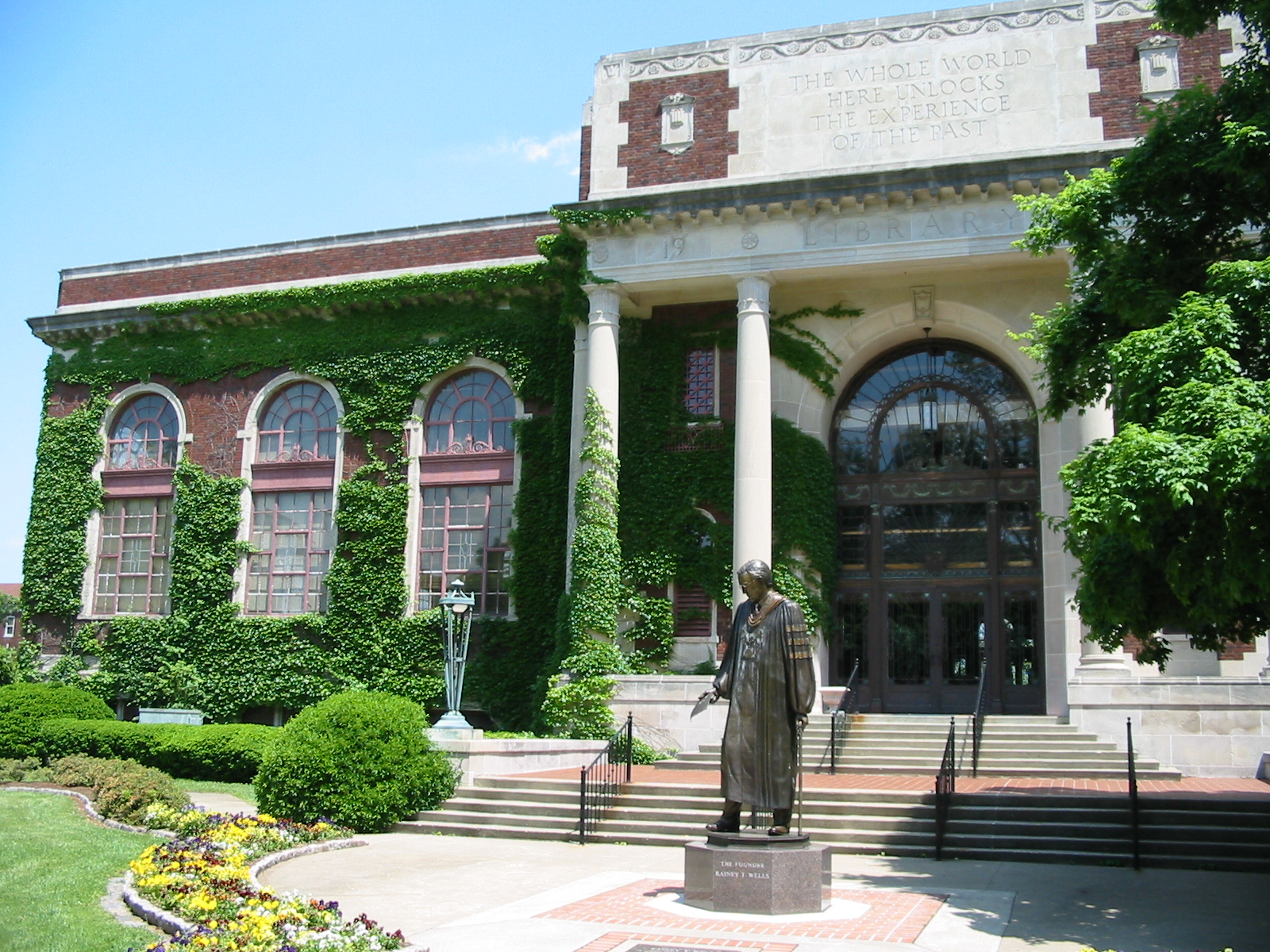
Murray State's Pogue Library

Kentucky has two early entrance to college programs, for academically gifted high school juniors and seniors, that allows the students to take college credits while finishing high school. They are the Craft Academy for Excellence in Science and Mathematics, and the Carol Martin Gatton Academy of Mathematics and Science.

Kentucky is home to eight public universities. Additionally, the commonwealth has 16 public community and technical colleges and over 30 private colleges and universities. The oldest of these is Transylvania University, the first college established west of the Allegheny Mountains and sixteenth established in the United States. Another of Kentucky's colleges, Berea College, was the first non-segregated, co-educational college in the South. Like many southern states, the ACT, not the SAT, is the preferred college entrance test; in fact, all students attending public high schools in the state are now required to take the ACT in their junior year (11th grade).

In the 2018–19 academic year, Kentucky universities awarded 76,449 total degrees, an increase of 4.6% from the previous year. The University of Kentucky distributed more degrees than any public or private college in the Commonwealth. Over 73% of the degrees awarded by Kentucky institutions in the 2018-19 were to in-state residents.

The average Kentucky university diploma recipients have a median salary of $35,323 three years after graduation. Median salaries three years after graduation are lowest for arts and humanities majors at $25,532. However, median salaries three years after graduation are highest for education majors at $44,408.

Graduation rate is defined as those complete a bachelor's degree within six years of enrolling in a university. The University of Kentucky has the highest graduation rate of all Kentucky public universities (65.8%). Low income students have a 41.9% chance of graduating within six years compared to state average of 61.5%.

== Kentucky Educational Television (KET) ==
KET is the commonwealth's public television network, and is the largest PBS network in the nation. KET took the air in 1968 after a private donation from Ashland Oil founder Paul G. Blazer. In addition to the PBS schedule, KET now airs programming aimed at local audiences and educational series used by some colleges in Kentucky as telecourses.

== Standardized testing ==
Since 1990, Kentucky had three major testing phases.

The Kentucky Instructional Results Information Service (KIRIS) was used from 1992 to 1998, and included (for 4th, 8th, and 12th grades) open-response items, performance events, an on-demand writing prompt, and writing and mathematics portfolios.

Based on psychometric concerns and lack of political support for KIRIS, 1998 legislation replaced KIRIS with the Commonwealth Accountability Testing System (or CATS; the acronym possibly inspired by the Kentucky Wildcats), using open-response and multiple-choice items, an on-demand writing prompt, a writing portfolio, and the TerraNova national norm-referenced test. As part of the testing change, the state set new "cut point" scale scores for rating student work as novice, apprentice, proficient and distinguished. The new cut points counted higher numbers as proficient in most subjects.

From 1999 to 2006, Kentucky schools showed improvement on the state's CATS assessment in every subject, at every level, for every student group listed in disaggregated data reports. Most elementary schools improved at a pace strong enough that, if continued, they would have reached the proficiency goals set by the state for 2014. Most middle schools and high schools, however, were improving at too slow a pace to meet those proficiency targets.

Major changes in CATS were made in 2007, including revisions to the content being tested, the years each subject is tested, the relative weight given to different topics, the relative weight given to multiple-choice and open-response questions, the national norm-referenced test included in school scores, and the "cut points" used to convert students' numerical scores to performance levels of novice, apprentice, proficient and distinguished. Those changes broke the state's "trend line", meaning that scores cannot be compared to past years.

Critics point out that the CATS changes significantly increased reported proficiency rates compared to the National Assessment of Educational Progress, a problem found in many state assessments. In addition, critics note that despite rising CATS scores, the remedial requirements for Kentucky's entering college freshmen remain very high (nearly one of two recent high school graduates requires at least one college remedial course in Kentucky's public college system) which has led to pending legislation to replace CATS with a more up to date and credible assessment.

The National Assessment for Educational Progress is the most respected source for comparing Kentucky public school students to those in other states. The most recent scale score results from the National Assessment of Educational Progress show Kentucky:

- Scoring above national average in fourth and eighth grade science.
- Statistically tied with national average in fourth and eighth grade reading, fourth grade writing, and eighth grade mathematics.
- Scoring below national average in fourth grade writing and eighth grade math.

Some NAEP critics argue that those results are unreliable because of differences in how states handle students with disabilities. In the latest NAEP testing, Kentucky did exclude higher proportions of learning disabled students in reading and writing than was typical across the nation.

== Assessment and Accountability Task Force ==
In 2008 a task force was established by the Kentucky Commissioner of Education to make recommendations to the 2009 Kentucky General Assembly. The task force is responsible for analyzing specific components of Commonwealth Accountability Testing System (CATS) and determining how effective they are in meeting student needs. The task force operates with seven scheduled meetings with the final meeting to be November 7, 2008.

== General profile of Kentucky's public universities ==
Institution	Endowment	Total students	Ave freshman ACT	% full-time	Ave. undergrad age	% living on campus	Freshman retention rate
Eastern Kentucky University	$55 million	15,673	21.1	96%	22	26%	65%
Kentucky State University	$8 million	2,500	18.1	94%		34%	54%
Morehead State University	$23 million	9,100	21.0	98%	22	35%	69%
Murray State University	$32 million	10,266	23.1	99%	22	38%	80%
Northern Kentucky University	$50 million	14,617	21.0	95%	23	11%	74%
University of Kentucky	$903 million	26,400	24.4	99%	21	33%	78%
University of Louisville	$794 million	22,000	24.4	97%	22	19%	78%
Western Kentucky University	$105 million	19,200	20.8	95%	21	31%	72%
TOTAL/ AVERAGE	$1.97 billion	119,756	21.73	96.63%	21.85	28.38%	71.25%

== Kentucky Council on Postsecondary Education ==
An outcome of the Kentucky Postsecondary Education Improvement Act of 1997 was the creation of the Kentucky Council on Postsecondary Education (CPE). CPE exists to foster the success of Kentucky's public and private universities and technical colleges by enacting education legislation, conducting university research, training educators and more. As a result, this educated workforce will be equipped to contribute to the economic growth of the Commonwealth.

The Council creates a strategic plan every five years to track progress and set goals for Kentucky's postsecondary educational system. The present strategic plan sets a goal for 60% of Kentuckians to earn a college degree or certification by the year 2030. With a 3% increase in undergraduate credentials in 2018, the state is on target to achieve this goal if current trends continue. Other goals involve increasing enrollment in low-income, minority and adult populations.

The Council is composed of 13 citizens, one faculty member and one student are appointed by the Governor. The Commissioner of Education, Dr. Robbie Fletcher, serves as a non-voting ex-officio member. The Council is led by President Aaron Thompson. Meetings are held at least quarterly at the CPE offices in the Kentucky State Capitol.

== See also ==
- History of education in Kentucky
- List of school districts in Kentucky
  - List of middle schools in Kentucky
  - List of high schools in Kentucky
- List of colleges and universities in Kentucky
  - University of Kentucky
  - Eastern Kentucky University
  - Western Kentucky University
