= Reading Area Community College =

Public college in Reading, Pennsylvania, US

Coordinates: 40.3346°N 75.9348°W

- Type: Public community college
- Established: 1971
- Endowment: $7.7 million
- President: Susan D. Looney
- Faculty: 284
- Students: 4,682
- Location: Reading, Pennsylvania, United States
- Campus: Urban
- Mascot: Raven
- Website: www.racc.edu

Reading Area Community College (RACC) is a public community college in Reading, Pennsylvania. The college was founded in 1971 and serves the greater Reading area and Berks County, Pennsylvania. The institution is a Hispanic-serving institution ('HSI') as defined by federal law (the Higher Education Opportunity Act, Title V, 2008).

== Academics ==
Reading Area Community College has over 4,000 students, most of whom study on a part-time basis (76.2%). Over two-thirds of the student body is female (68.7%), and over half of students receive need-based financial aid through the Pell Grant (60.7%).

=== Demographics ===
Student body composition as of Fall 2023
Race and ethnicity	Total
Black	10.3%
Hispanic	46.6%
Asian	1.5%
White	34.8%
Other (Note: Other consists of Multiracial Americans & those who prefer to not say.)	6.79%
