= Hopkinsville Community College =

Community college in Hopkinsville, Kentucky, U.S.

- Type: Public community college
- Established: 1965
- Parent institution: Kentucky Community and Technical College System
- Academic affiliations: Space-grant
- President: Dr. Alissa Young (2018-present)
- Students: 3,800
- Location: Hopkinsville, Kentucky, United States; 36.8826°N 87.4883°W
- Colors: Navy █ and Gold █
- Website: hopkinsville.kctcs.edu

Hopkinsville Community College (HCC) is a public community college in Hopkinsville, Kentucky. It is one of 16 two-year, open-admissions colleges of the Kentucky Community and Technical College System (KCTCS). Founded in 1965, HCC maintains a main campus in Hopkinsville and an off-site campus on the Fort Campbell Army base. HCC is accredited by the Southern Association of Colleges and Schools (SACS). It offers Associate in Science and Associate in Applied Science degrees.
