= Big Sandy Community and Technical College =

Community college in Prestonsburg, Kentucky, U.S.

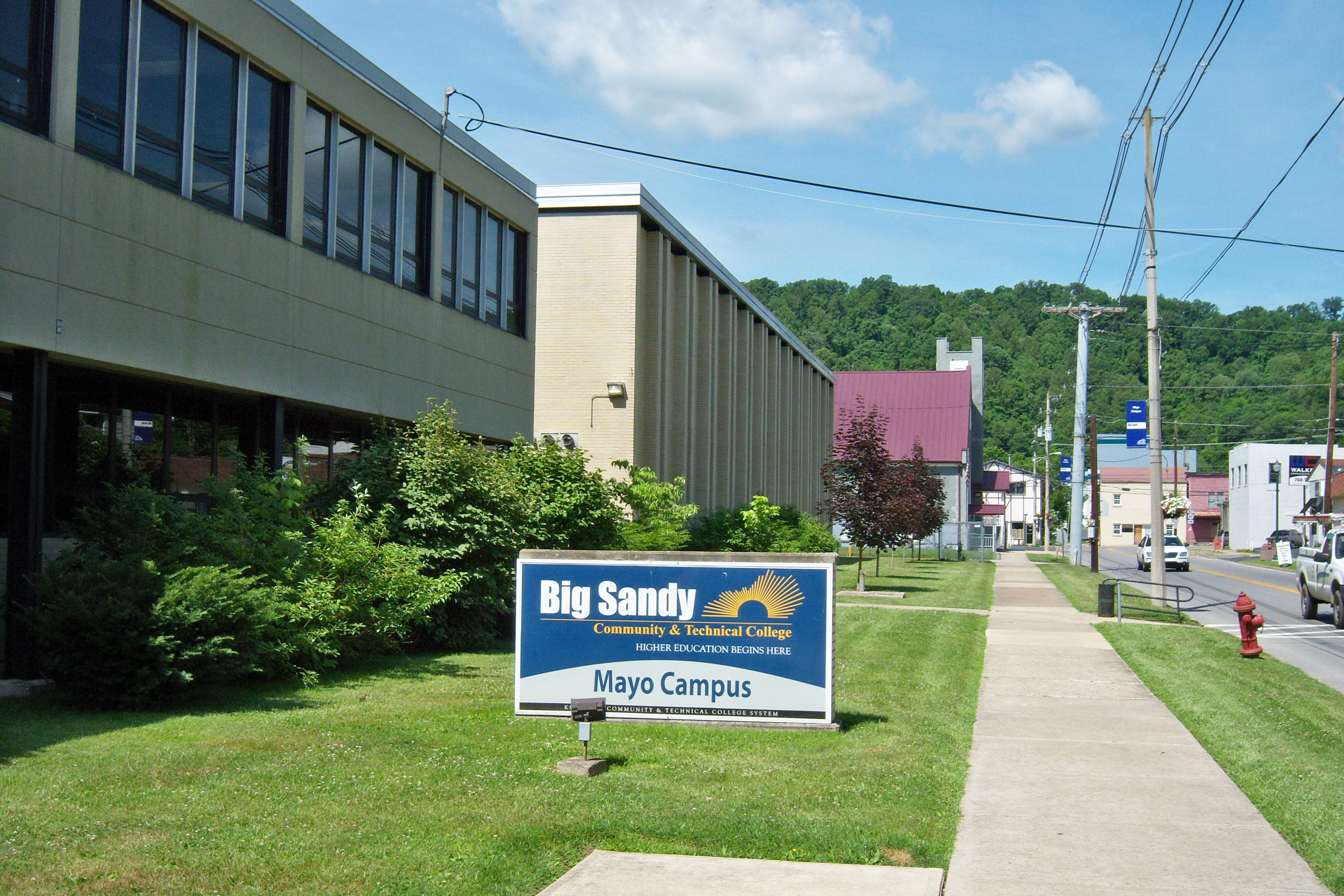
- Mayo Campus
- Type: Public community college
- Established: 2003
- Parent institution: Kentucky Community and Technical College System
- President: Samuel Todd Brand
- Students: 4,754 (2013-14)
- Location: Prestonsburg, Kentucky, United States; 37°41′16.32″N 82°46′41.14″W
- Campus: multiple sites
- Colors: Navy █ and Gold █
- Website: bigsandy.kctcs.edu

Big Sandy Community and Technical College (BSCTC) is a public community college with its headquarters in Prestonsburg, Kentucky. It is part of the Kentucky Community and Technical College System. It was created in 2003 from the consolidation of Prestonsburg Community College and Mayo Technical College. BSCTC maintains four campus locations: Prestonsburg Campus (formerly Prestonsburg Community College) in Prestonsburg; Mayo Campus (formerly Mayo Technical College) in Paintsville; Pikeville Campus in Pikeville; and Hager Hill Campus in Hager Hill. Big Sandy Community and Technical College is accredited by the Southern Association of Colleges and Schools (SACS).

== Service area ==
The primary service area of BSCTC includes the following counties:

- Floyd
- Johnson
- Magoffin
- Martin
- Pike

== See also ==
- East Kentucky Science Center
