= Maysville Community and Technical College =

Public college in Maysville, Kentucky, USA

- Type: Public community college
- Established: 2004
- Parent institution: Kentucky Community and Technical College System
- President: Dr. Laura McCullough
- Location: Maysville, Kentucky, United States; 38.6267°N 83.8052°W
- Colors: Navy █ and Gold █
- Website: http://www.maysville.kctcs.edu

Maysville Community and Technical College (MCTC) is a public community college in Maysville, Kentucky. It is part of the Kentucky Community and Technical College System. It was formed in December 2004 from the consolidation of Maysville Community College in Maysville and Rowan Technical College in Morehead, Kentucky. MCTC is accredited by the Southern Association of Colleges and Schools Commission on Colleges.

== Service area ==
The primary service area of MCTC includes:

- Bath County
- Bourbon County
- Bracken County
- Carter County
- Elliott County
- Fleming County
- Harrison County
- Lewis County
- Mason County
- Menifee County
- Montgomery County
- Morgan County
- Nicholas County
- Powell County
- Robertson County
- Rowan County
- Wolfe County
- Adams County
- Brown County

== Campuses ==
MCTC maintains four campuses and several satellite locations and offers programs at the East Kentucky Correctional Complex.

=== Maysville Campus ===
The Maysville Campus (formerly Maysville Community College) is in Maysville, Kentucky. Its original building is the 53,000-square-foot (4,900 m^{2}) Administration Building constructed in 1969. In 1983, the 16,231-square-foot (1,507.9 m^{2}) Denham Wing was added. The third building added to the campus was the 31,314-square-foot (2,909.2 m^{2}) Calvert Student Center that was completed in 1992 and is connected to the Denham Wing. In 2002, the 45,000-square-foot (4,200 m^{2}) Technical Center became the fourth building on campus. In 2010, a new science building was completed, unconnected to the previous complex.

=== Rowan Campus ===
The Rowan Campus (formerly Rowan Technical College) is five miles (8.0 km) west of Morehead, Kentucky, on Kentucky Highway 801 on a 41-acre (170,000 m^{2}) tract of land adjacent to the Morgan-Menifee-Rowan Regional Business Park.

=== Licking Valley Campus ===
The Licking Valley Campus opened in Cynthiana, Kentucky in 1989. In 2002, the Licking Valley Campus moved from a leased facility to its new 19,000-square-foot (1,800 m^{2}) building in Cynthiana.

=== Montgomery Campus ===
The Montgomery Campus opened in Mt. Sterling, Kentucky in 2013. The Montgomery Campus fills a 64,000-square-foot (5,900 m^{2}) building that was originally home to Cowden Manufacturing where denim jeans and other apparel had been produced.
