= Southeast Kentucky Community and Technical College =

Community college in Cumberland, Kentucky, U.S.

- Type: Public community college
- Established: 1960
- Affiliations: Kentucky Community and Technical College System
- President: Andrea Lee Harrison
- Location: Cumberland, Kentucky, United States; 36.966°N 82.998°W
- Colors: Navy █ and Gold █
- Website: http://www.southeast.kctcs.edu

Southeast Kentucky Community and Technical College (SKCTC) is a public community college in Cumberland, Kentucky, United States. It is part of the Kentucky Community and Technical College System (KCTCS) and was founded in 1960 as the Southeast Center of the University of Kentucky by Senator Richard Glenn Freeman.

SKCTC is accredited by the Southern Association of Colleges and Schools (SACS). Before being renamed in 2004, Southeast Kentucky Community and Technical College was Southeast Community College.

== Academics ==
SKCTC offers degree programs leading to three associate degrees:

- Associate of Arts
- Associate of Science
- Associate of Applied Science

It also offers diploma and certificate programs.

== Service area ==
The primary service area of SKCTC includes:

- Bell County
- Harlan County
- Knox County
- Letcher County
- Neighboring counties in Tennessee and Virginia

== Campuses ==
SKCTC maintains campuses in Cumberland, Barbourville, Harlan, Middlesboro, Pineville and Whitesburg.
