= Owensboro Community and Technical College =

Public college in Owensboro, Kentucky, US

- Type: Public community college
- Established: 1986
- Parent institution: Kentucky Community and Technical College System
- Academic affiliations: Space-grant
- President: Dr. Scott Williams
- Location: Owensboro, Kentucky, United States; 37.7177°N 87.0826°W
- Colors: Blue █ and Gold █
- Website: http://www.owensboro.kctcs.edu

Owensboro Community and Technical College (OCTC) is a public community college in Owensboro, Kentucky. It is part of the Kentucky Community and Technical College System (KCTCS). Owensboro Community College (est. 1986) and Owensboro Technical College (est. 1929) consolidated to become OCTC. OCTC is accredited by the Southern Association of Colleges and Schools (SACS) to offer technical as well as associate's degree programs.

== Service area ==
The primary service area of OCTC includes:

- Daviess County
- Hancock County
- Ohio County
- McLean County
- Spencer County (Indiana)

== Campuses ==
OCTC maintains four campus locations (Main Campus, Downtown Campus, Southeastern Campus and a Hancock County Center in Lewisport, KY), all in Kentucky. Main Campus is located at 4800 New Hartford Road Owensboro, KY 42303
