= Gateway Community and Technical College =

Community college in Covington, Edgewood, and Florence Kentucky, U.S.

Gateway Community & Technical College
- Type: Public community college
- Established: 2002
- Affiliations: Kentucky Community and Technical College System
- President: Fernando Figueroa
- Location: Covington, Kentucky, United States; 39.0854°N 84.5102°W
- Colors: Navy █ and Gold █
- Website: gateway.kctcs.edu

Gateway Community & Technical College is a public community college in Covington, Kentucky. It is part of the Kentucky Community and Technical College System (KCTCS). Gateway enrolls over 5,000 students. The college provides transfer and career education and training and offers more than 200 associate degrees, diplomas and certificates in 30 subject areas. Classes are provided at three Gateway locations in Boone County, Covington, and Edgewood. Through partnerships with more than 400 local businesses, Gateway provides customized, short-term training to more than 3,000 other people.

Gateway is accredited by the Commission on Colleges of the Southern Association of Colleges and Schools to award associate degrees. Gateway is also accredited by the Council on Occupational Education.

== Service area ==
The primary service area of Gateway includes:

- Boone County
- Campbell County
- Grant County
- Kenton County
- Pendleton County
