= Bluegrass Community and Technical College =

Public community college in Lexington, KY

Coordinates: 38.02481°N 84.50365°W

- Type: Public community college
- Established: 2005
- Parent institution: Kentucky Community and Technical College System
- Academic affiliations: Space-grant
- President: Dr. Greg Feeney
- Location: Lexington, Kentucky, United States
- Campus: Multiple Sites
- Colors: KCTCS Blue; KCTCS Gold
- Website: bluegrass.kctcs.edu

Bluegrass Community and Technical College (BCTC) is a public community college in Lexington, Kentucky. It is one of sixteen two-year, open admission colleges of the Kentucky Community and Technical College System (KCTCS). It was formed from the consolidation of two separate institutions: Lexington Community College and Central Kentucky Technical College. Lexington Community College was the last remaining college in the University of Kentucky Community College System until a vote by the trustees transferred governance to KCTCS in 2004. Prior to 1984, the college was named Lexington Technical Institute. Central Kentucky Technical College was part of the Workforce Development Cabinet of the Kentucky State Government until the creation of KCTCS in 1997. KCTCS was formed in 1997 by the state legislature through House Bill 1 which combined the technical colleges of the Workforce Development Cabinet and the community colleges previously with the University of Kentucky. BCTC is accredited by the Southern Association of Colleges and Schools Commission on Colleges (SACSCOC).

BCTC has a large international student base with students attending from Europe, Jordan, Turkey, and many other nations. As of Fall 2009, 11,500 students were enrolled at BCTC. As of 2019, tuition in-state is $182 (per credit hour) USD, Out-of-state $356 (per credit hour) USD (2019–20)

== Service area ==
The primary service area of BCTC includes:

- Anderson County
- Boyle County
- Clark County
- Estill County
- Fayette County
- Franklin County
- Jessamine County
- Madison County
- Mercer County
- Powell County
- Scott County
- Woodford County

== Campuses ==
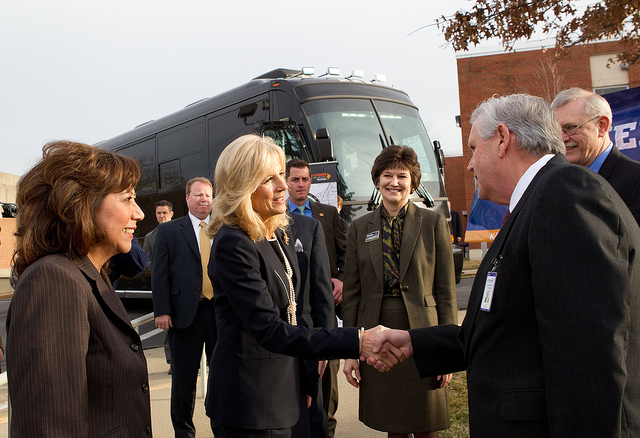
Hilda Solis and Jill Biden visiting Bluegrass Community and Technical College in 2012.

BCTC consists of seven campus locations in Central Kentucky and many additional sites. It also maintains an Advanced Manufacturing Center, BCTC Equine, formerly known as the North American Racing Academy (NARA), and other educational sites.

Main campuses

- Newtown Campus
- Leestown Campus

Regional campuses

- Danville Campus (Boyle County) (Danville)
- Lawrenceburg Campus (Anderson County) (Lawrenceburg)
- Winchester-Clark County Campus (Winchester)
- Georgetown-Scott County Campus (Georgetown)

Additional sites

- Cooper Campus (Lexington)
- Fayette County Adult Education - Newtown Campus North (Lexington)
- BCTC Equine program, formerly called the North American Racing Academy (NARA), at the Thoroughbred Training Center (Lexington)

BCTC's Newtown Campus consists of four large buildings. The Science Education Center is geared towards science, while the Classroom Building focuses on more general education courses. The newest building, the Den, houses a variety of student services. The historic administration building is currently vacant and in the process of being renovated. The property once housed Eastern State Hospital.

BCTC's Leestown Campus consists of four buildings. Building C contains a variety of programs including Automotive Technology, Welding, Autobody, Cosmetology, a community day care center, Workforce Solutions, and Administrative offices. The Manufacturing Building includes programs in Electrical Technology, Engineering Technology, Industrial Maintenance Technology, Machine Tool, Computer Aided Drafting, and various classrooms, offices, and labs. Building A has the campus library and variety of classrooms and programs including Nursing and Adult Basic Education. Building B houses the Carpentry program and Shipping and Receiving.

BCTC Georgetown is located at the North American Production Support Center of Toyota on Cherry Blossom Drive. It focuses on Industrial Maintenance Technology and utilizes a unique combination of classroom space, open lab, and internships. The campus is a key partner in AMTEC, an NSF funded collaboration of community colleges and automotive manufacturers and suppliers focusing on technical education. BCTC's Cooper Campus is located closest to the University of Kentucky campus, in the shadow of Kroger Field. The Cooper Campus consists of three buildings: the Academic Technical (AT), Oswald, and Moloney buildings. Oswald is the main building, consisting of a number of offices and classrooms, as well as the Bluegrass Cafe, the Learning Resource Center (Library) or LRC, and a Barnes & Noble College bookstore. The Academic Technical (AT) Building is primarily classrooms, and Moloney contains more classrooms, as well as several computer labs and department offices.

BCTC has a robust online education program, offering a wide variety of general education courses and technical courses. The online course tuition is an affordable flat-rate for in-state and out-of-state students alike. Online students come from all over the world.
