= Southcentral Kentucky Community and Technical College =

Community college in Bowling Green, Kentucky, U.S.

- Other name: SKYCTC
- Type: Public community college
- Established: 1939
- Parent institution: Kentucky Community and Technical College System
- President: Michelle Trawick
- Location: Bowling Green, Kentucky, United States; 36°59′3.87″N 86°28′36.38″W
- Colors: Navy █ and Gold █
- Website: southcentral.kctcs.edu

Southcentral Kentucky Community and Technical College (SKYCTC) is a public community college in Bowling Green, Kentucky. It is an open-admissions college and a member of the Kentucky Community and Technical College System. The college is accredited by the Southern Association of Colleges and Schools.

== History ==
Southcentral Kentucky Community and Technical College was established as Western Trade School in 1939 and was operated by Western Kentucky State Teachers College (later Western Kentucky University (WKU). In 1962, the school became independent of WKU, and underwent two name changes before joining KCTCS in 1997 and becoming Bowling Green Technical College. On December 7, 2012, the KCTCS Board of Regents approved a request to change the name to Southcentral Kentucky Community and Technical College, recognizing the fact that the college's accreditor, the Southern Association of Colleges and Schools, had designated it as a comprehensive community college and granted approval for it to award the Associate in Arts and Associate in Science degrees.

== Service area ==
Southcentral Kentucky Community and Technical College has a 10 county service area. Included are:

- Allen County
- Barren County
- Butler County
- Edmonson County
- Hart County
- Logan County
- Metcalfe County
- Monroe County
- Simpson County
- Warren County

== Campuses ==
Southcentral Kentucky Community and Technical College maintains six campuses:

- Main Campus
- Glasgow Health Campus
- Glasgow Technology Campus
- KATI Campus
- Transpark Center
- Franklin-Simpson Center
