= 2012 Women's Four Nations Hockey Tournament =

2012 Women's Four Nations Hockey Tournament may refer to:

- 2012 Women's Four Nations Hockey Tournament (Córdoba), Argentina, 18–22 January
- 2012 Women's Four Nations Hockey Tournament (Terrassa), Spain, 28 February – 2 March
- 2012 Women's Four Nations Hockey Tournament (North Harbour), New Zealand, 12–16 April
- 2012 Women's Four Nations Hockey Tournament (Auckland), New Zealand, 18–22 April
