= Gila Community College =

Community college in Gila County, Arizona, US

Coordinates: 33°47′28″N 110°50′11″W

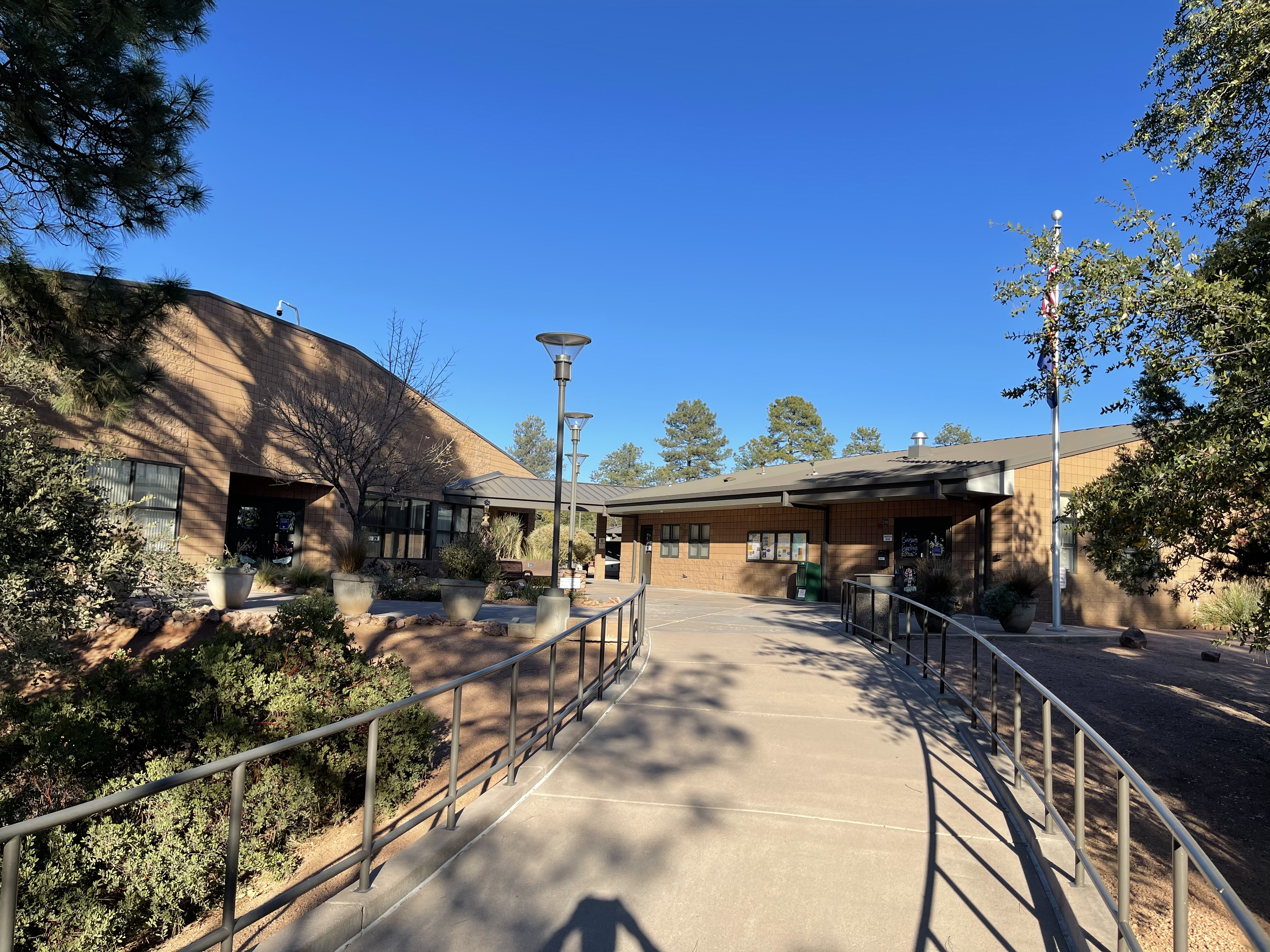
Gila Community College, Payson Campus, Payson, Arizona

Gila Community College (GCC) is the community college serving the Gila Community College District in Gila County, Arizona. It has two campuses:

1. Gila Pueblo Campus, Globe, Arizona
2. Payson Campus, Payson, Arizona

GCC currently has the status of a "provisional college". It operates under an accreditation contract with Eastern Arizona College, the community college of neighboring Graham County, Arizona. It is currently beginning efforts to become an independent, accredited community college in its own right.

== Gila Pueblo Campus ==
The campus buildings were originally built a atop Gila Pueblo ruins for the Gila Pueblo Archaeological Foundation, before passing into the ownership of the University of Arizona, then the National Park Service, and finally the current community college. The Gila Pueblo ruins are thought to have been created by the Hohokam people.
