= Milwaukee Career College =

Technical school in Wisconsin, United States

Coordinates: 43°04′27.3″N 88°02′56.2″W

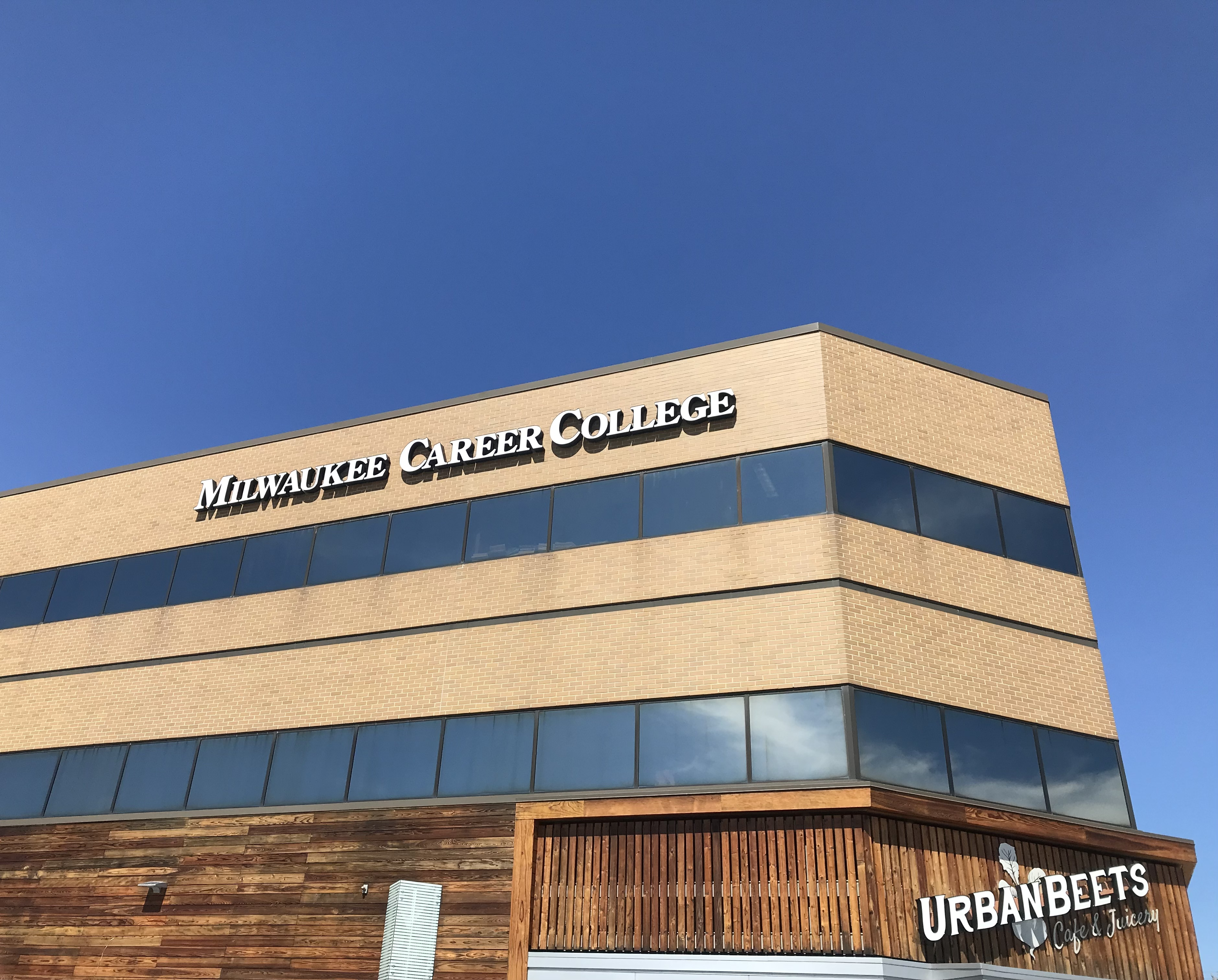
- Type: Private for-profit technical school
- Established: 2002
- Location: Wauwatosa, Wisconsin, United States
- Website: mkecc.edu

Milwaukee Career College (MCC) is a private for-profit technical school in Wauwatosa, Wisconsin. It awards certificates and two-year associate degrees.

== History ==
MCC opened in 2002 after purchasing the building from a training company. In 2006, MCC earned national accreditation through the Accrediting Bureau of Health Education Schools (ABHES), followed by approval to participate in Title IV federal student aid programs in 2007.

== Accreditation and approval ==
MCC is accredited by the Accrediting Bureau of Health Education Schools (ABHES). Its Veterinary Technician program is accredited by the American Veterinary Medical Association (AVMA). MCC is approved to do business in Wisconsin as a private school by the Wisconsin Educational Approval Program.
