= 2012 Women's Four Nations Hockey Tournament (Terrassa) =

Women's field hockey tournament

Four Nations
Tournament details
- Host country: Spain
- City: Terrassa
- Teams: 4 (from 2 confederations)
- Venue(s): Estadio Federativo

Final positions
- Champions: United States (1st title)
- Runner-up: Great Britain
- Third place: Spain

Tournament statistics
- Matches played: 6
- Goals scored: 10 (1.67 per match)
- Top scorer(s): (United Kingdom) Chloe Rogers (United Kingdom) Kate Walsh (2 goals)

The 2012 Women's Four Nations Hockey Tournament was a women's field hockey tournament, consisting of a series of test matches. It was held in Terrassa, Spain from 28 February to 2 March 2012, and featured four of the top nations in women's field hockey.

== Competition format ==
The tournament featured the national teams of Belgium, Great Britain, the United States, and the hosts, Spain, competing in a round-robin format, with each team playing each other once. Three points will be awarded for a win, one for a draw, and none for a loss.

Country	October 2011 FIH Ranking	Best World Cup finish	Best Olympic Games finish
Belgium	16	Third Place (1978)	Never qualified.
Great Britain	4	Third Place (2010)	Third Place (1992)
Spain	11	Fourth Place (2006)	Champions (1992)
United States	10	Third place (1994)	Third place (1984)

== Officials ==
The following umpires were appointed by the FIH to officiate the tournament:

- Blanca Beltrán (ESP)
- Hannah Sanders (ENG)
- Suzanne Sutton (USA)
- Valentina Tomasi (ITA)
- Marine de Witte (BEL)

== Results ==
=== Standings ===
Pos	Team	Pld	W	D	L	GF	GA	GD	Pts	Result
1	United States	3	2	1	0	4	2	+2	7	Tournament Champion
2	Great Britain	3	2	0	1	6	3	+3	6	
3	Spain (H)	3	0	2	1	0	2	−2	2	
4	Belgium	3	0	1	2	0	3	−3	1	

Source: RFEH
Rules for classification: 1) points; 2) goal difference; 3) goals scored; 4) head-to-head result.
(H) Hosts

=== Fixtures ===
28 February 2012
12:00

Great Britain	2–3	United States
Rogers 58', 67'	Report	Taylor 43'; O'Donnell 46'; Selenski 51'

Umpires:
Blanca Beltrán (ESP)
Marine de Witte (BEL)

28 February 2012
16:00

Spain	0–0	Belgium
	Report

Umpires:
Valentina Tomasi (ITA)
Hannah Sanders (ENG)

29 February 2012
14:00

Great Britain	2–0	Belgium
McLeod 17'; Walsh 51'	Report

Umpires:
Suzi Sutton (USA)
Valentina Tomasi (ITA)

29 February 2012
16:00

United States	0–0	Spain
	Report

Umpires:
Hannah Sanders (ENG)
Marine de Witte (BEL)

2 March 2012
12:00

United States	1–0	Belgium
Crandall 69'	Report

Umpires:
Valentina Tomasi (ITA)
Blanca Beltrán (ESP)

2 March 2012
16:00

Spain	0–2	Great Britain
	Report	Richardson 22'; Walsh 67'

Umpires:
Marine de Witte (BEL)
Suzi Sutton (USA)

== Goalscorers ==
There were 10 goals scored in 6 matches, for an average of 1.67 goals per match.

2 goals

- (United Kingdom) Chloe Rogers
- (United Kingdom) Kate Walsh

1 goal

- (United Kingdom) Hannah McLeod
- (United Kingdom) Helen Richardson
- (United States) Lauren Crandall
- (United States) Kathleen O'Donnell
- (United States) Paige Selenski
- (United States) Shannon Taylor
