= Turks and Caicos Islands Community College =

Community college in the Turks and Caicos

Turks and Caicos Islands Community College (TCICC) is a community college in the Turks and Caicos, a British territory in the Caribbean. It has two campuses with one each in Grand Turk and Providenciales.

Starting in September 2022, tuition is free for students who are Turks and Caicos Islanders and British Overseas Territories Citizens.

== History ==
TCICC opened in September 1994. Initially H. J. Robinson High School in Grand Turk and Clement Howell High School in Provindenciales housed the college on a temporary basis. It has changed base twice after this and the Providenciales campus moved to the current space in September 2011.

== Curriculum ==
The community college offers vocational training in a variety of trades:

- Commercial Food Preparation
- Costmetology
- Customer Service
- General Office Administration
- Nail Technology
- Spa Therapy
- Food and Beverage
- Electrical Engineering Technology

=== Associates and Bachelors programs ===
- Architectural Design
- Automotive Engineering Technology
- Business Administration with concentration in accounting, finance, marketing and human resource management
- Computer Studies
- Computer Electronics Engineering
- Criminal Justice
- Culinary Arts
- Early Childhood Education
- Electrical Engineering Technology
- General Studies
- Hospitality Management
- Information Technology
- Natural and Applied Science
- Management Information System
- Nursing
- Primary Education
- Secondary Education
- Social Work
- Tourism Management and Entertainment
