= Marrickville Hospital =

Geography
- Location: Lilydale Street, Marrickville, NSW, Australia
- Coordinates: 33°54′30″S 151°09′12″E

History
- Founded: 1897-1899
- Closed: 1990

Links
- Lists: Hospitals in Australia

Marrickville Hospital was a hospital in Marrickville, a suburb in the Inner West of Sydney, in the state of New South Wales, Australia.

== History ==
A group to fund the construction of the hospital began in 1895. Morgan and Josephson Architects were appointed to design the buildings and the foundation stone was laid in 1897 by Governor Hampden. Consisting of two buildings, one facing Lilydale Street and another one behind, the hospital was opened in 1899 as Marrickville Cottage Hospital. That same year, the hospital proper opened, and was renamed Marrickville District Hospital in 1922. An isolation wing was added to the rear block in 1902 and a second building was constructed on the front block in 1905. The two buildings on the front block were joined by the addition of a square tower over the entrance facing Lilydale Street in 1913. Matron Helen Beattie ran the hospital for 32 years, until her retirement in 1935. Nurses trained here included Edna Shaw who became known as the "Mother of 100,000 babies".

By the 1970s a lack of funding saw declining usage for the site, and in 1990, the hospital closed its doors, and has remained empty since.

== Redevelopment ==
In 2015, Marrickville Council released plans to redevelop the site into a residential and commercial development including a new library and 'community hub'. The council entered into a partnership with developer Mirvac to deliver the project. The site is located on the corner of Marrickville and Livingstone roads.
