= Crown Street Women's Hospital =

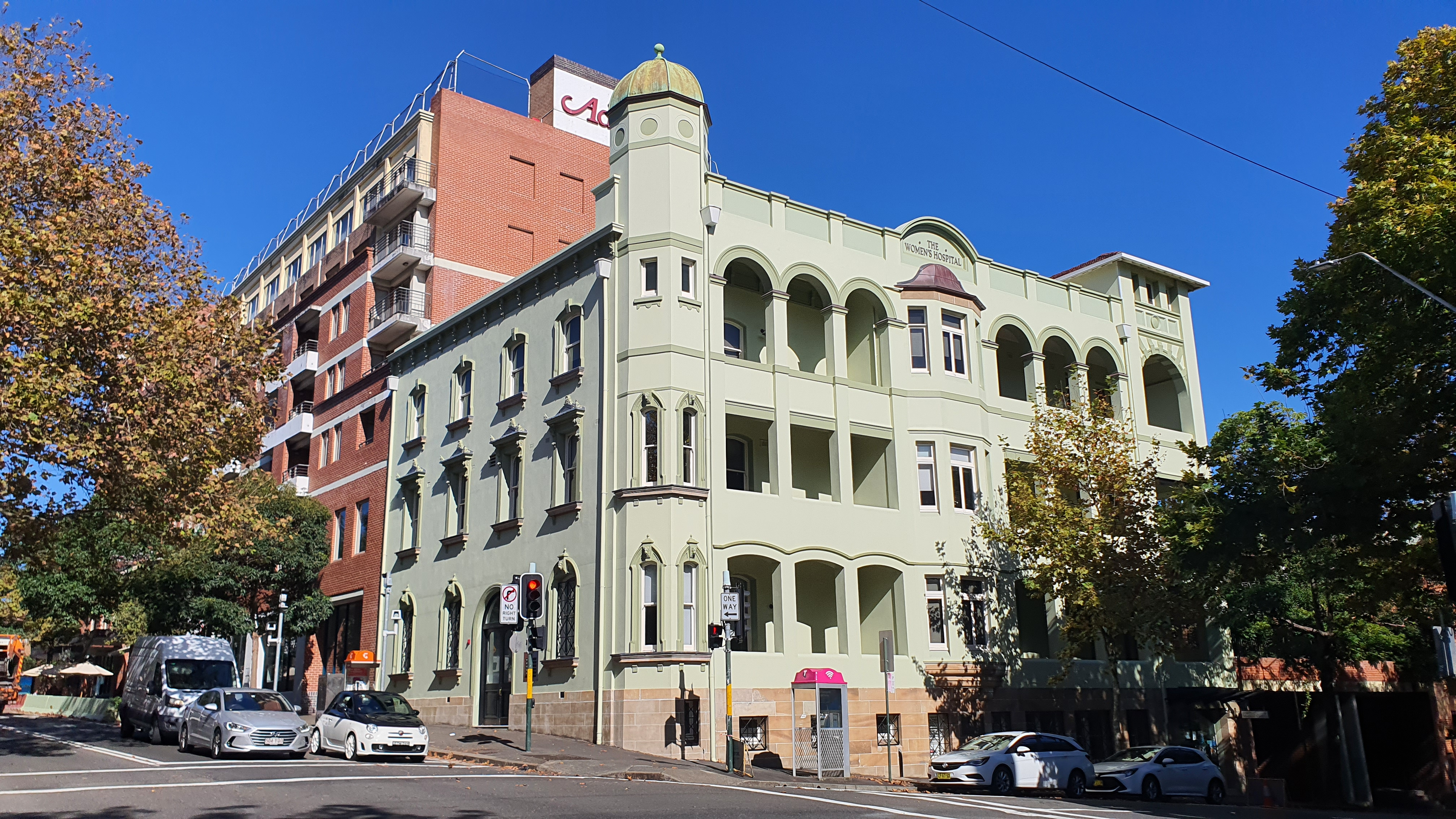
- Crown Street Women's Hospital

Geography
- Location: Crown Street, Surry Hills, Sydney, New South Wales, Australia
- Coordinates: 33°53′01″S 151°12′51″E

Organisation
- Care system: Public Medicare (AU)
- Type: Teaching
- Affiliated university: University of Sydney

Services
- Speciality: Women's hospital

History
- Opened: 1893
- Closed: 1983, services transferred to Westmead Hospital

Links
- Lists: Hospitals in Australia

Crown Street Women's Hospital (now-closed) was once the largest maternity hospital in Sydney, New South Wales, Australia. It was located at 351 Crown Street on the corner of Albion Streets, Surry Hills.

The hospital was one of several stand-alone maternity hospitals in Sydney, none of which remain. It opened in 1893, and was closed in 1983. During its 90-year life, it trained hundreds of midwives and doctors, and was a teaching hospital of the University of Sydney. Many thousands of Sydney's residents were born there. When Westmead Hospital opened in Sydney's west, Crown Street Hospital's maternity facilities were moved there, along with the general medical and surgical departments of Sydney Hospital on Macquarie Street, and the hospital was closed.

The Canonbury annex was demolished around 1983, with the site redeveloped as part of McKell Park.

== History ==
Founded by Dr James Graham in 1893, the Women's Hospital was then in Hay Street and it had two beds for the "genteel poor". The first nurse was Hannah McLeod and she served for nineteen years. The hospital moved to Crown Street in 1897.

Crown Street Women's Hospital aimed to lift the medical standards for maternity care. In addition to providing wards for surgical cases and complicated births the Hospital provided treatment in homes. Initial funding of the Women's Hospital came from public subscription, obstetric nurse training and student fees, with assistance from the Government in obtaining furniture and surgical instruments. The Board of the Women's Hospital met for the first time on 13 August 1895.

One of the hospital's early achievements was to train Hannah McLeod as a midwife, so that she could train women who were already acting as midwives without any medical certification. On 30 October 1919 the Permanent Auxiliary Organisation was founded to centralise offers of assistance. Permanent Auxiliary Centres were opened at Abbotsford in 1933 and Bondi–Waverley in 1937. By its Golden Jubilee in 1943 Crown Street Women's Hospital had become the largest maternity hospital in New South Wales.

The hospital's nurseries were divided into five categories: D, Premature, Adoption, Founders Isolation and Main.

The Crown Street Women's Hospital was closed on 31 March 1983 and its facilities were transferred to Westmead Hospital. The Crown Street Women's Hospital Medical Records were transferred to Prince of Wales Hospital, Randwick.

== Hospital history timeline ==
- First president (Mary Windeyer) (1895)
- Indoor Department (October 1896)
- Teaching Hospital Status with the University of Sydney (1897)
- First known Aboriginal person to register as a nurse, May Yarrowick, completes her training at the hospital (1907).
- Hugh Dixson Isolation Block (1909)
- Death of first matron, Hannah McLeod (1912)
- Parent Education (offered from 1915)
- The Permanent Auxiliary Organisation was founded to centralise all offers of assistance received by the hospital (30 October 1919)
- Founders Block building was opened providing administrative offices, Resident
  Medical Officers quarters, labour wards, and operating theatre, recovery room, and nurses quarters (3 June 1930)
- X-Ray Department (September 1935)
- The Sterility Clinic was established 1938
- Mobile Transfusion Service or "Flying Squad" (1939)
- Crown Street Women's Hospital had become the largest maternity hospital in New South Wales (1943)
- Diet Department (1947)
- Canonbury at Darling Point was opened as annexe to the Women's Hospital (1947)
- During the 1940s and 1950s Founders Block building was remodelled as the gynaecology block of the hospital (1940s–1950s)
- Matron Edna Shaw established a Baby Bureau in 1951, nearby to allow expectant women to centrally book a bed for giving birth.
- Lady Wakehurst Annexe at Waverley was opened as post-operative care centre (January 1952)
- Unit for the Research into the Newborn (1961)
- Department of Anaesthesia (1963)
- Intensive Care Unit (1966)
- Ultra Sound Department (1971)
- Sam Stening Intensive Care Annexe (December 1972)
- Therapeutic Abortion Clinic opened. From 1975 women requesting abortions were seen in the Consultancy Clinic (1973 to 1975)
- Aboriginal Nurse visits to postnatal patients (1976)
- Birth Centre for natural childbirth (17 September 1979)
- The Sterility Clinic was renamed as the Alan Grant Fertility Clinic (28 November 1979)
- Lady Wakehurst Annexe was closed and redeveloped as a Hospital and Retraining Unit for Intellectually Retarded Young Adults. (1980)
- Hospital closes and services transferred to Westmead Hospital (1983)
- Canonbury buildings demolished and land reformed into McKell Park (1983)

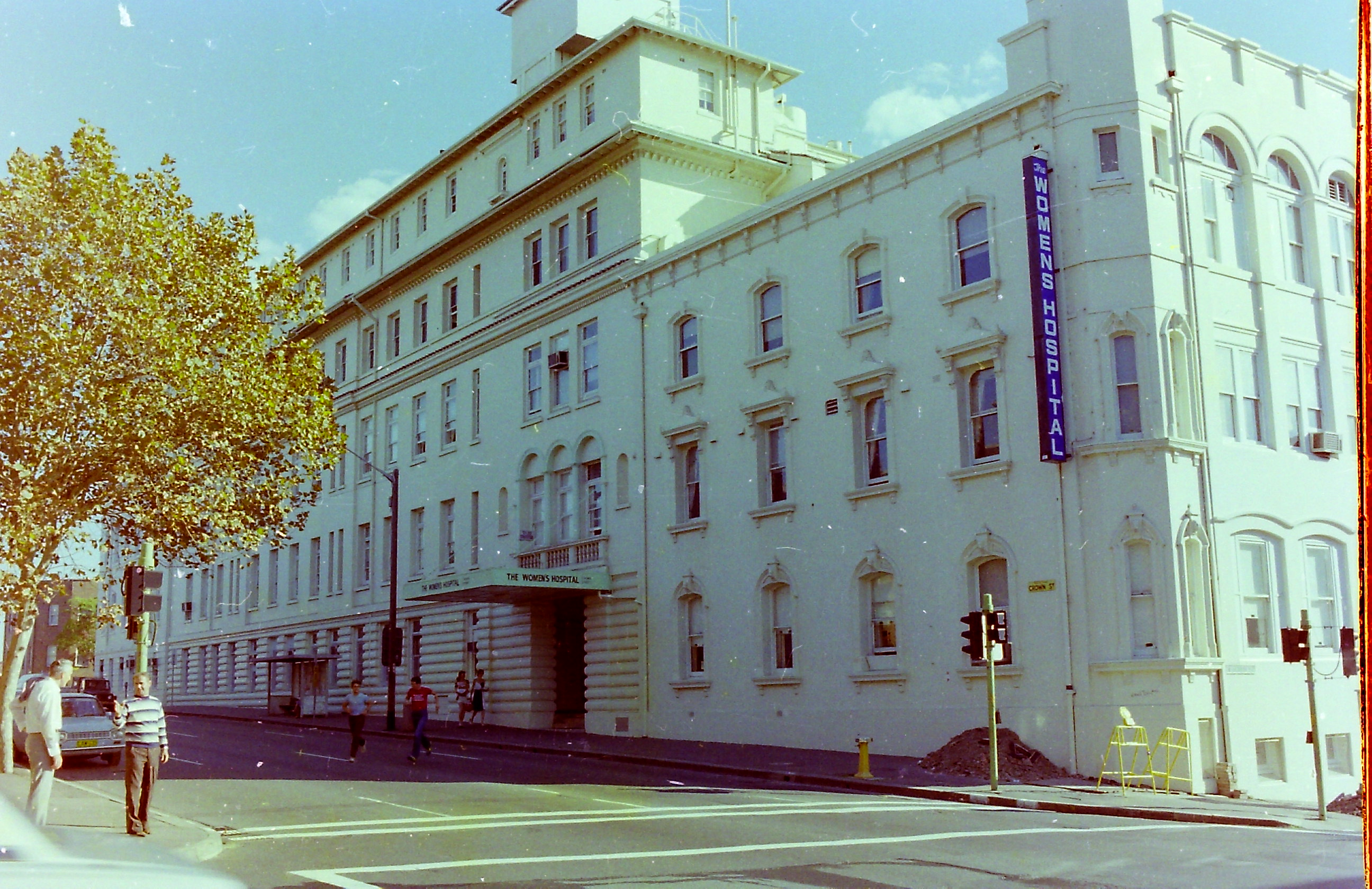
Crown St Women's Hospital circa 1981
