= Edna Shaw =

Australian hospital matron (1891–1974)

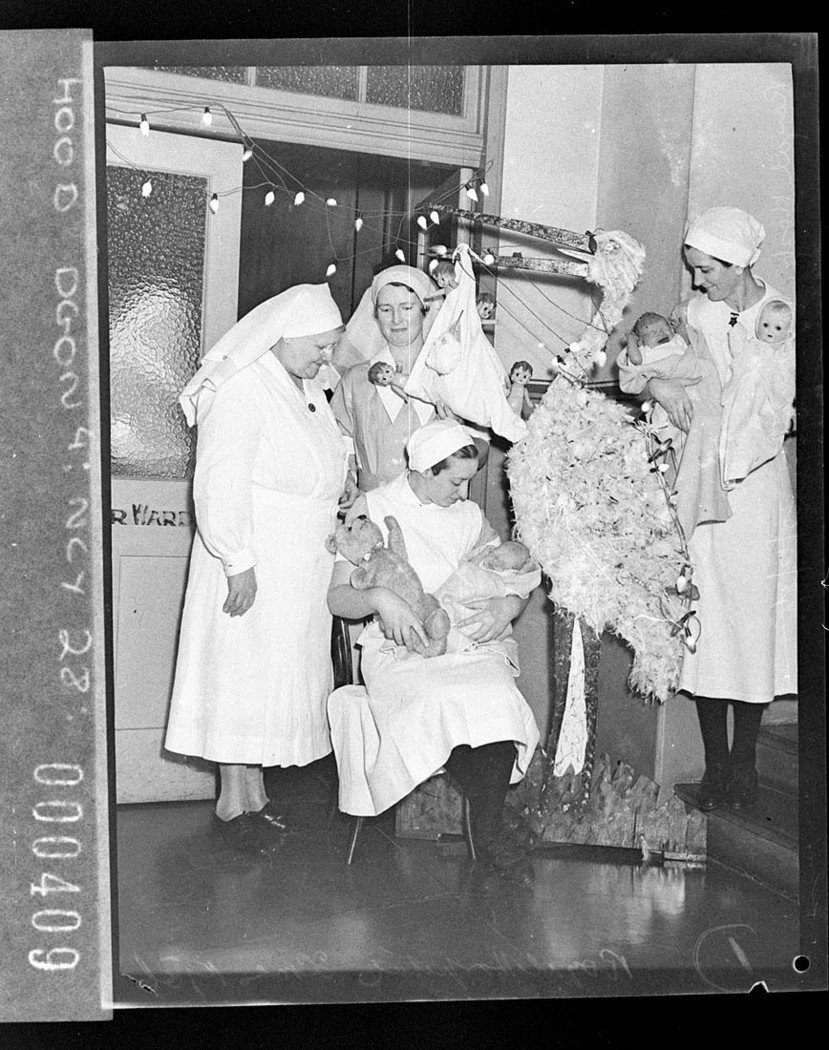
- Royal Hospital for Women Paddington Christmas 1936
- Born: Edna Mary Anne Jane Shaw; 7 June 1891; Murrumburrah, New South Wales, Australia
- Died: 25 January 1974 (aged 82); Waverley, New South Wales, Australia
- Education: Marrickville Hospital, Royal Hospital for Women
- Occupations: Hospital matron, nurse, midwife
- Years active: 1919-1952 (retirement)
- Employer: Crown Street Women's Hospital
- Known for: "Mother of 100,000 babies"

Edna Mary Anna Jane Shaw OBE (7 June 1891 – 25 January 1974) was an Australian hospital matron (formerly deputy matron), nurse and midwife. She was called the "Mother of 100,000 babies".

== Biography ==
Shaw was born in Murrumburrah, New South Wales. Her parents were Mary Emillia (born Druitt) and her husband the Rev. Augustus Rutherford Shaw, an Anglican clergyman. They had both been born in Australia. She was their first child and they would have five more. She trained as a nurse at Marrickville Hospital in the suburbs of Sydney during the war years of 1914 to 1917. She qualified as a midwife in the following year at what became the Royal Hospital for Women. She volunteered for the military but the armistice was soon agreed.

In January 1919 Shaw joined Crown Street Women's Hospital as deputy matron and was appointed matron in 1936.

From 1938 until the end of her career she was a member of the Australasian Trained Nurses' Association's council.

In 1951 she was still organising the nursing at Crown Street Hospital when she was lauded for arranging what was called a "Baby Bureau". Previously expectant women had to go from hospital to hospital in Sydney to find a bed where they could give birth. Shaw's Maternity Booking Office for Metropolitan Hospitals (aka Baby Bureau) took on this task giving mothers a one-stop shop where they would be told of a hospital that had a free bed for them. The booking also benefitted the hospitals as mothers would reserve beds in several hospitals to ensure that they had a space.

Shaw retired as a matron in 1952 having been identified as "the mother of 100,000" babies. A public appeal raised a thousand pounds for her. She had been made an OBE in 1950 for her services to nursing.

She died in Waverley in 1974.
