= Hannah McLeod =

Australian hospital matron (1857–1912)

Hannah McLead
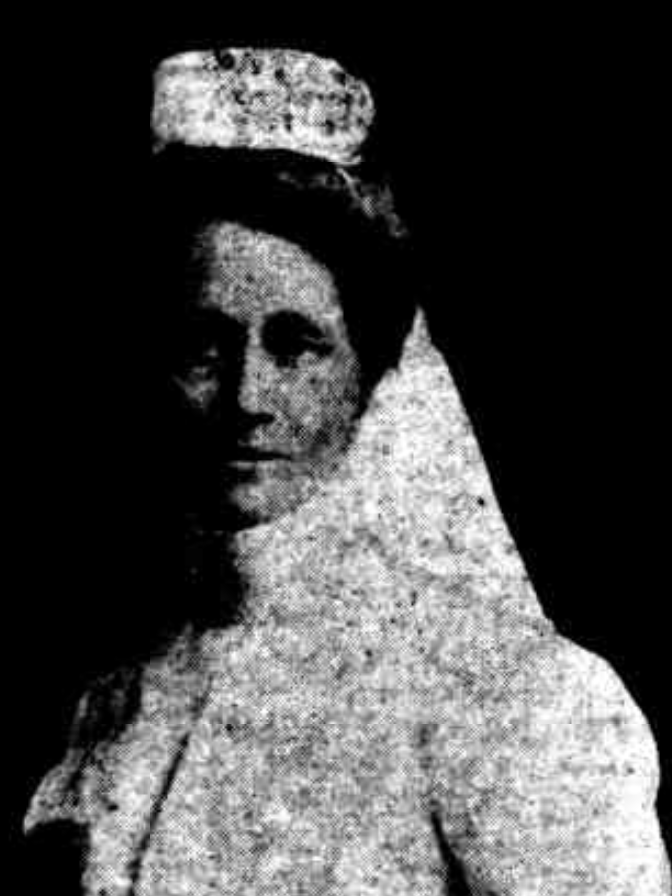
- Born: 25 August 1857; Redfern, Sydney
- Died: 24 October 1912 (aged 55); Sydney
- Occupations: Hospital Matron, nurse, midwife

Hannah McLeod (25 August 1857– 24 October 1912) was an Australian hospital matron, nurse and midwife.

== Biography ==
McLeod was born in 1857 in Sydney, New South Wales Her parents were Eleanor Fowler (born Phillips) and her husband William Browne McLeod and she was their fourth child. Eleanor and William were both born in Britain and William was a master mariner.

She went to school in Sydney and then trained at Newcastle General Hospital. In 1893, she was appointed to Crown Street Women's Hospital when it was still in Hay Street. She served for 19 years. She was a member of Australasian Trained Nurses' Association In 1907, she testified before the New South Wales Parliament.

McLeod wrote a section on "The Early Rearing and Handling of Children" in Hannah Rankin's Handbook of Domestic Science.

McLeod died from pneumonia in October 1912. It was said that she had tended to 40,000 women.
