= Sydney Community College =

Educational institution in Sydney, Australia

- Type: Registered training organization
- Established: 1986
- Founder: Garry Traynor
- Accreditation: Australian Skills Quality Authority
- Principal: Garry Traynor
- Location: Sydney, New South Wales, Australia; 33.8665°S 151.1733°E
- Website: sydneycommunitycollege.edu.au

Sydney Community College is a community college in Sydney, Australia.

== History ==
Garry Traynor is the principal of the college. He founded the college in 1986 and is director of its board. In 2020, he received the Medal of the Order of Australia for his service to adult education.

The college offers classes in areas like construction, language, cooking, and pole walking. The college also runs an Adult and Community Education program in partnership with Hampden Park Public School.
