= 82–84 Windmill Street, Millers Point =

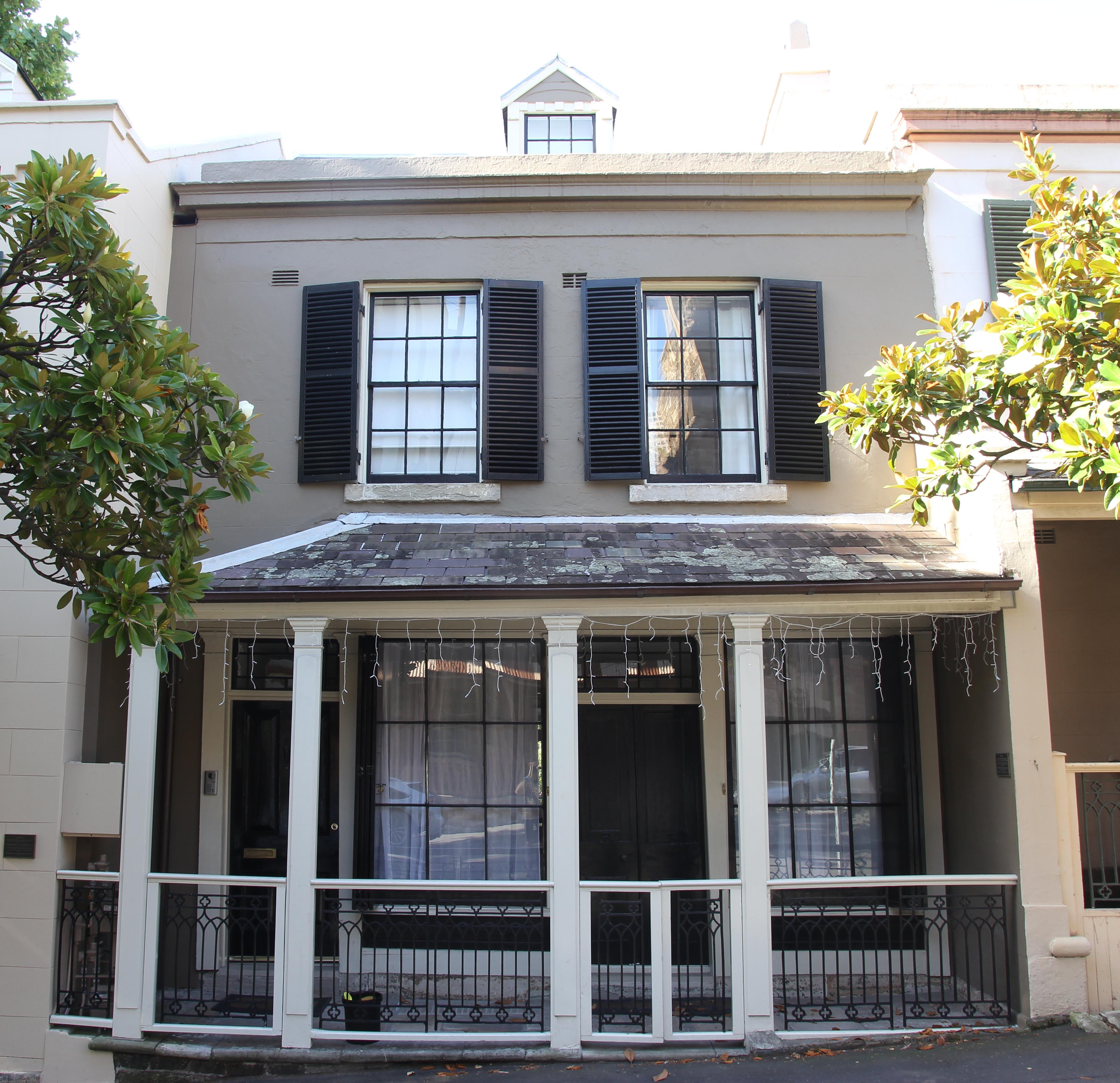
- 84 Windmill Street, pictured in 2019.

- Location within Sydney Location within Australia
- 33.8575°S 151.2056°E
- Location: 82–84 Windmill Street, Millers Point, City of Sydney, New South Wales, Australia

History
- Built: c. 1860

Site notes
- Architectural style: Victorian Georgian

New South Wales Heritage Register
- Official name: Royal College of Pathologists (former); Terrace
- Type: State heritage (built)
- Designated: 2 April 1999
- Reference no.: 843 / 851
- Type: Historic site

82–84 Windmill Street, Millers Point is a heritage-listed residence and former residence and office located at 82–84 Windmill Street, in the inner city Sydney suburb of Millers Point in the City of Sydney local government area of New South Wales, Australia. It is also known as the Royal College of Pathologists (former) and Terrace. It was added to the New South Wales State Heritage Register on 2 April 1999.

== History ==
Millers Point is one of the earliest areas of European settlement in Australia, and a focus for maritime activities.

82–84 Windmill Street is a Georgian Revival style Victorian townhouse built c. 1860, once the home of naturalist John William Brazier, and also part of the Royal College of Physicians.

In 1958 architect John Fisher (member of the Institute of Architects, the Cumberland County Council Historic Buildings Committee and on the first Council of the National Trust of Australia (NSW) after its reformation in 1960), with the help of artist Cedric Flower, convinced Taubmans to paint the central bungalow at 50 Argyle Place. This drew attention to the importance of The Rocks for the first time. As a result, Fisher was able to negotiate leases for Bligh House (later Clydebank) and houses in Windmill Street for various medical societies.

In 1971, a 20-year lease was granted by the City of Sydney for the use of premises at 82 Windmill Street to the Royal College of Pathologists of Australasia. In 1974 a lease to the College was granted by the City over 84 Windmill Street. The College renovated both buildings and use them as offices until 1984 when the College purchased Durham Hall in Surry Hills and relocated to that property.

== Description ==
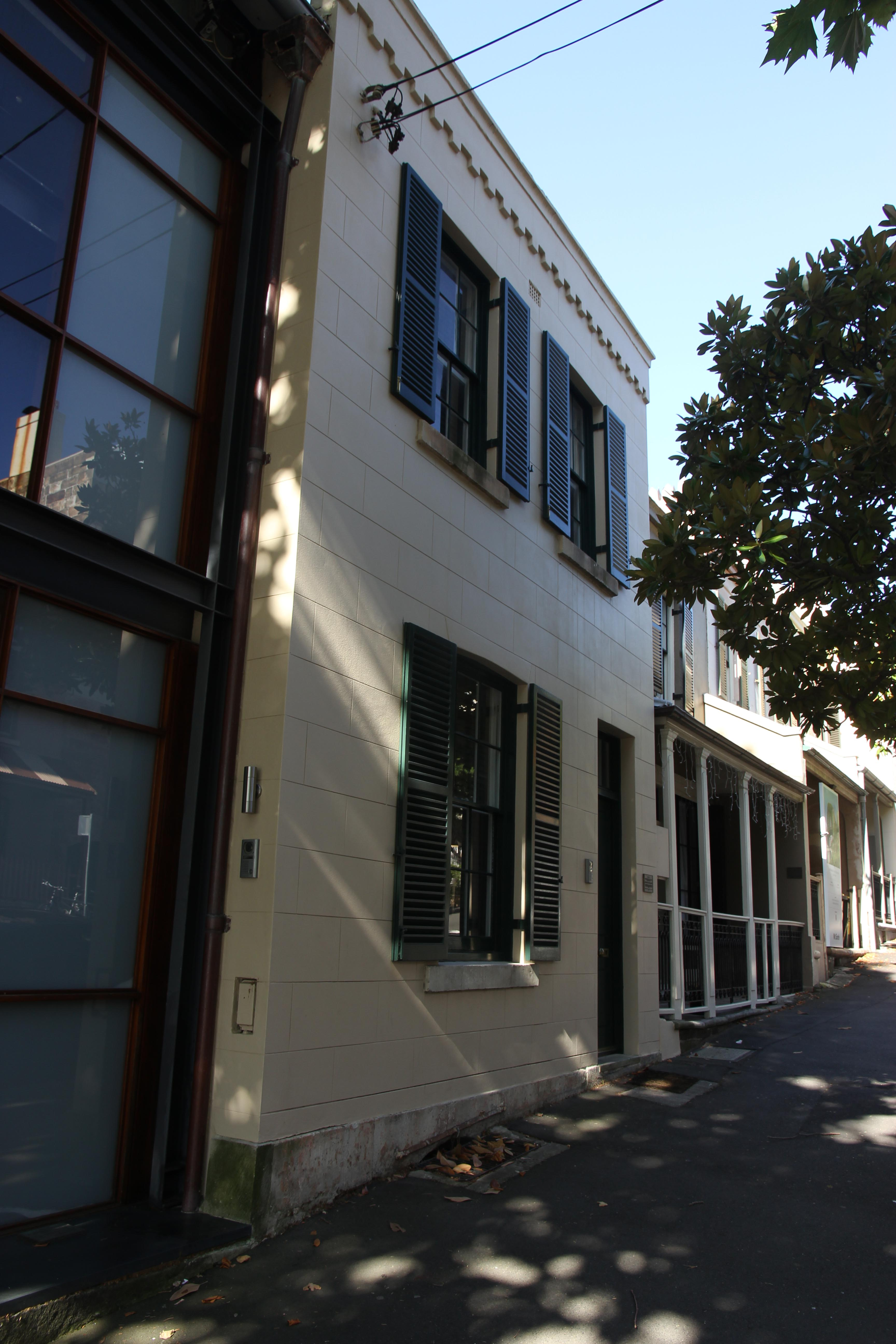
82 Windmill Street, pictured in 2019.

Victorian Georgian, two storey townhouse with attic and basement. Shutters to all windows, fanlight over front door. Storeys: 2 Construction: Painted rendered masonry, slate roof. Painted timber joinery. Iron lace balustrade. Style: Victorian Georgian.

=== Condition ===
External: Good.

== Heritage listing ==
As at 23 November 2000, this Victorian Georgian townhouse was constructed c. 1860. Once the home of noted naturalist John William Brazier, it was also formerly part of the Royal College of Physicians. It is part of the Millers Point Conservation Area, an intact residential and maritime precinct. It contains residential buildings and civic spaces dating from the 1830s and is an important example of 19th century adaptation of the landscape.

82–84 Windmill Street, Millers Point was listed on the New South Wales State Heritage Register on 2 April 1999.

== See also ==
- 86-88 Windmill Street
