= 197, 199, 201 Albion Street, Surry Hills =

197, 199, 201 Albion Street terrace cottages
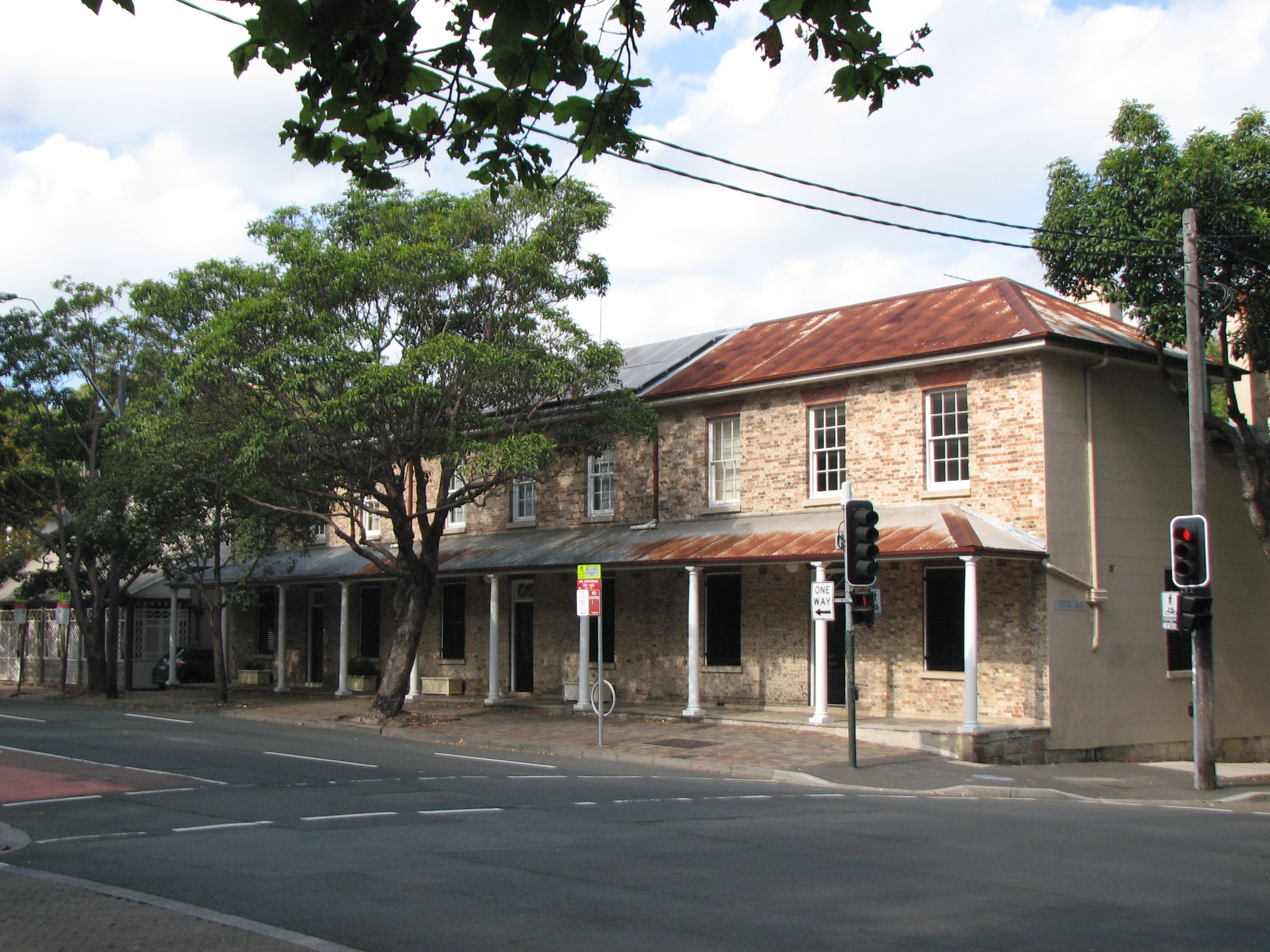
- 197, 199, 201 Albion Street, Surry Hills, New South Wales

- Location within Sydney Location within Australia
- 33°53′03″S 151°12′59″E
- Location: 197, 199, 201 Albion Street, Surry Hills, City of Sydney, New South Wales, Australia

History
- Built: 1845–1847

New South Wales Heritage Register
- Official name: Terrace Cottages
- Type: State heritage (built)
- Designated: 2 April 1999
- Reference no.: 64
- Type: Terrace
- Category: Residential buildings (private)

197, 199, 201 Albion Street terrace cottages are three heritage-listed terraced houses located at 197, 199, 201 Albion Street in the inner city Sydney suburb of Surry Hills in the City of Sydney local government area of New South Wales, Australia. It was added to the New South Wales State Heritage Register on 2 April 1999.

== History and description ==
A row of three Victorian Georgian town houses of two storeys built between 1845 and 1847. The front verandah has been reconstructed. The walls are sand stock brick and the roof is corrugated steel sheeting.

== Heritage listing ==
The terrace cottages site was listed on the New South Wales State Heritage Register on 2 April 1999.

== See also ==
- 203–205 Albion Street cottages
- Media related to 197, 199, 201 Albion Street, Surry Hills at Wikimedia Commons
