= Albion Street, Surry Hills =

Street in Sydney, Australia

Albion Street, Surry Hills New South Wales
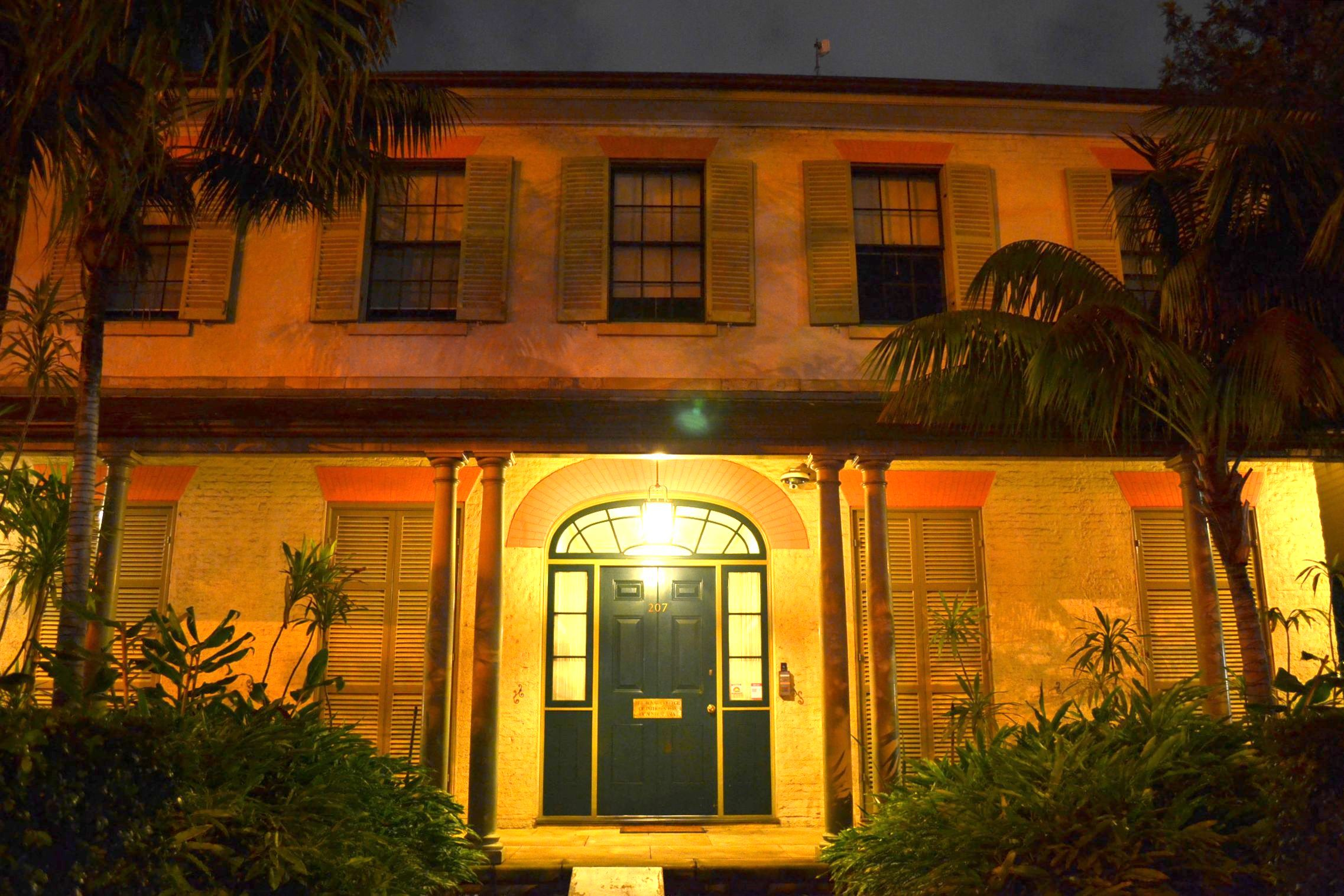
- Durham Hall on Albion Street
- Coordinates: 33.881715°S 151.208640°E (Western end); 33.883918°S 151.217582°E (Eastern end)

General information
- Type: Street
- Length: 850 m (0.5 mi)

Major junctions
- Western end: Elizabeth Street; Surry Hills
- Crown Street; Bourke Street
- Eastern end: Flinders Street; Surry Hills

Location(s)
- LGA(s): City of Sydney
- Major suburbs: Surry Hills

Albion Street is a street in Sydney, New South Wales, Australia in the local government area of the City of Sydney. It runs east-west from Elizabeth Street to Flinders Street, and is approximately one kilometre long.

The street is notable for its historical background and heritage-listed buildings and sites. It includes both commercial and residential buildings, a number of which have heritage listings at state or federal levels. The street encompasses a wide variety of styles, including Victorian and Federation styles, as well as significant examples of ecclesiastical architecture.

== Points of interest ==
- Terraced homes: Albion Street has a series of terraced houses that feature wrought-iron balconies in the Victorian manner, as seen also in suburbs like Glebe and Paddington. Some are two-storeyed and some three-storeyed.
- Carlingford Terrace: this terrace consists of eight homes built 1868–1869. They have three storeys and there is a carriageway that gives access to the homes. The terrace has a state heritage listing. The Royal College of Pathologists of Australia, Australian Academy of Forensic Sciences and International Academy of Pathology are based in this building.
- Durham Hall: a heritage-listed Georgian single-storey house built in 1834–1835 by George Hill.
- St Michael's Church: this church was designed by Edmund Blacket and built in 1854. In 1888, a belfry and dormers were added. With the accompanying church hall and rectory, it makes up a group that is listed on the Register of the National Estate.
- Frog Hollow Reserve and O'Hears Stairs: situated at the intersection with Riley Street, Frog Hollow was developed in the 19th century as substandard housing for the poor, with the result that the area became known for crime, gangs and prostitution. The council demolished the housing in the 1920s and turned the area into a park. It is accessed from Albion Street by O'Hears Stairs, which are heritage-listed.
- Children's Court: this building was designed by the government architect, Walter Liberty Vernon, and built 1910–1911. It is in the Federation Free Classical style and received a mention in the novel Come In Spinner. It is heritage-listed.
- Women's Hospital: situated at the intersection with Crown Street, this building was first built as a church hospital. It was remodelled and extended over the years and became a teaching hospital of the University of Sydney. It was closed in 1983; the original building is heritage-listed.
- Chinese Presbyterian Church: this building was built in 1905 as the Fullerton Memorial Church, situated at the intersection with Crown Street. Later, the local Chinese community outgrew their church in Campbell Street, so they acquired the Fullerton Church and moved into it in 1957. An example of the Federation Academic Gothic style, the building has a state heritage listing.
- 177 and 177a Albion Street: this is a three-storey building finished in stucco, which was a common Victorian practice. It was built in 1880 and includes sandstone stables and carriagehouse that have been adapted for residential use. The building is listed on the Register of the National Estate.
- 197–201 Albion Street: a heritage-listed terrace of three two-storeyed homes built of sandstock brick from 1845–1847.
- 203–205 Albion Street: a heritage-listed single-storey terrace made from sandstock brick, built c. 1840.

== Gallery ==
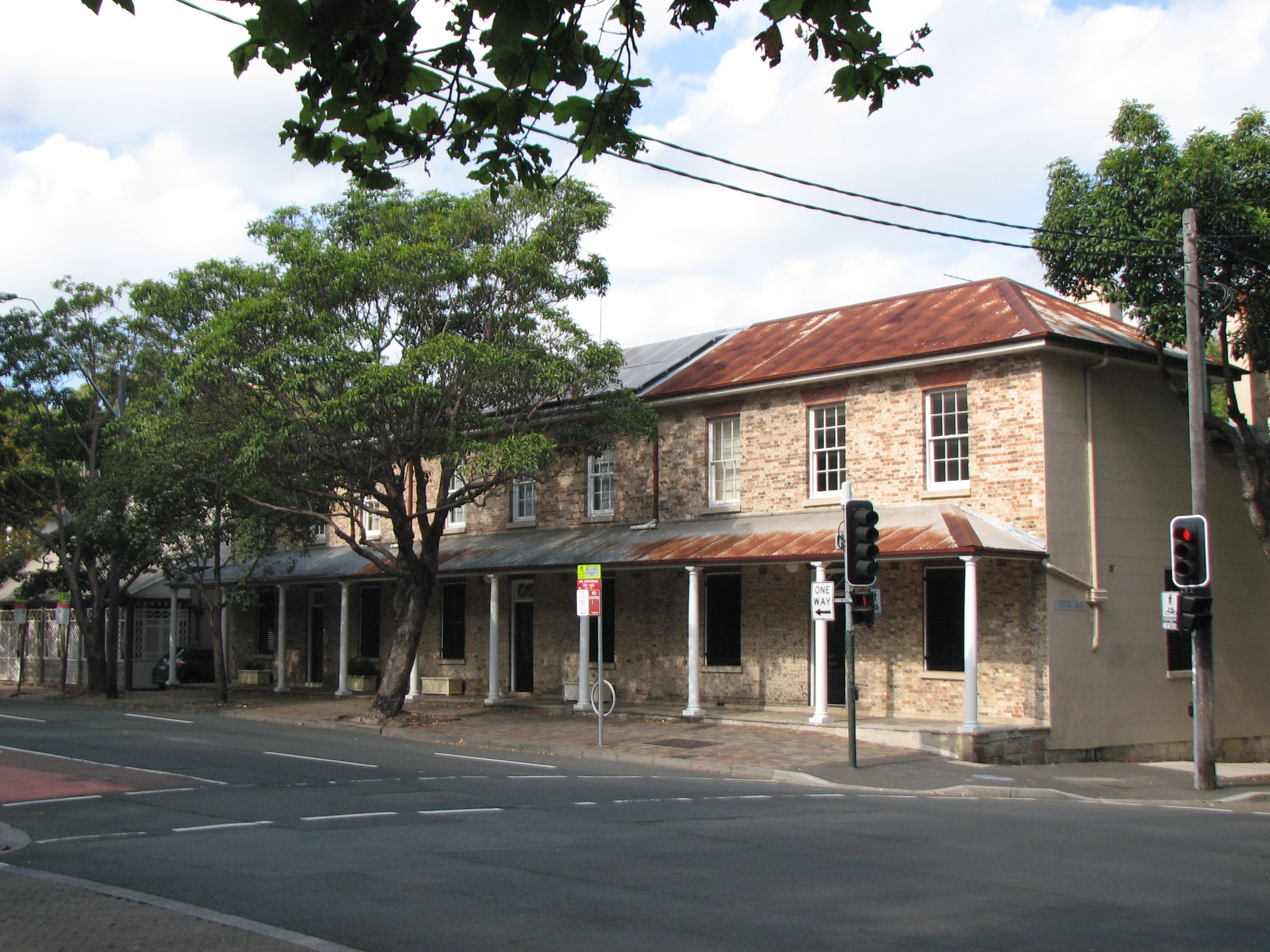
197–201 Albion Street

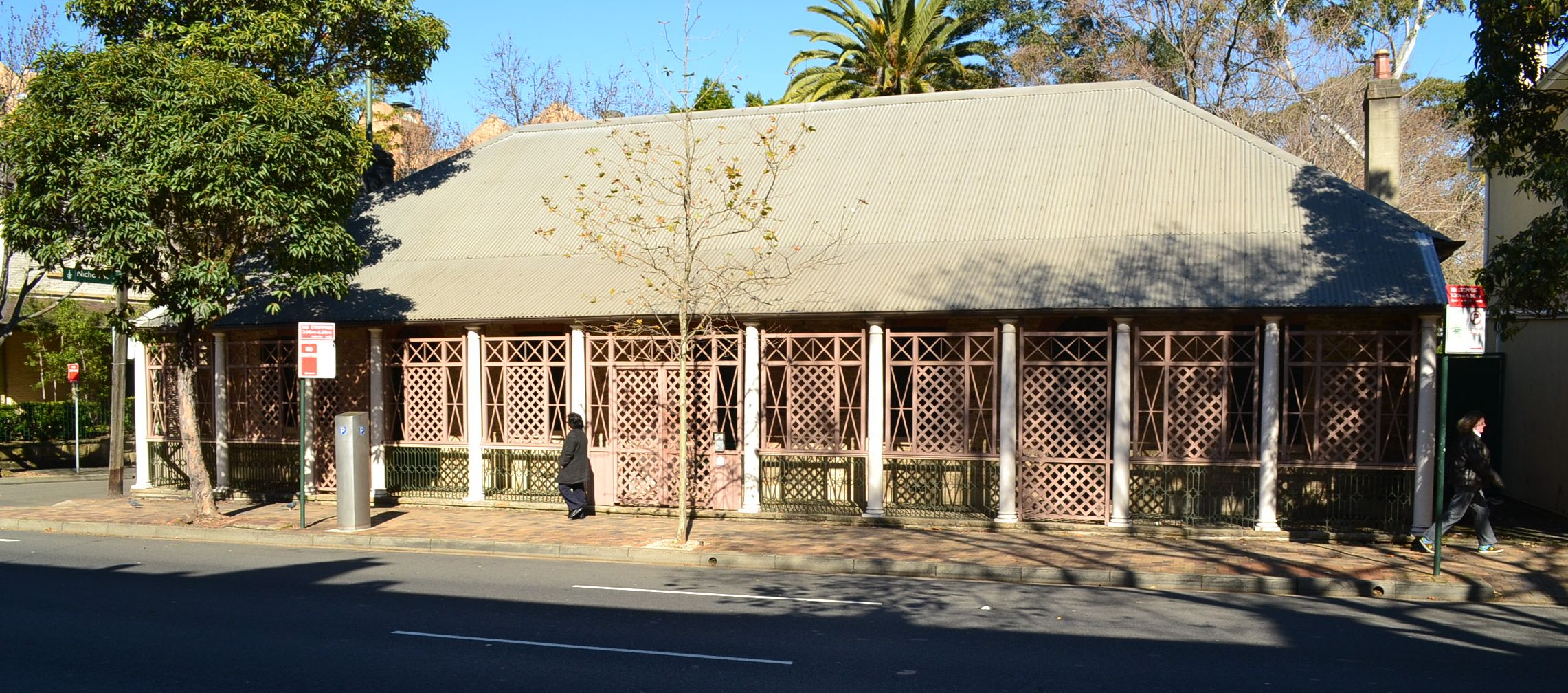
203–205 Albion Street

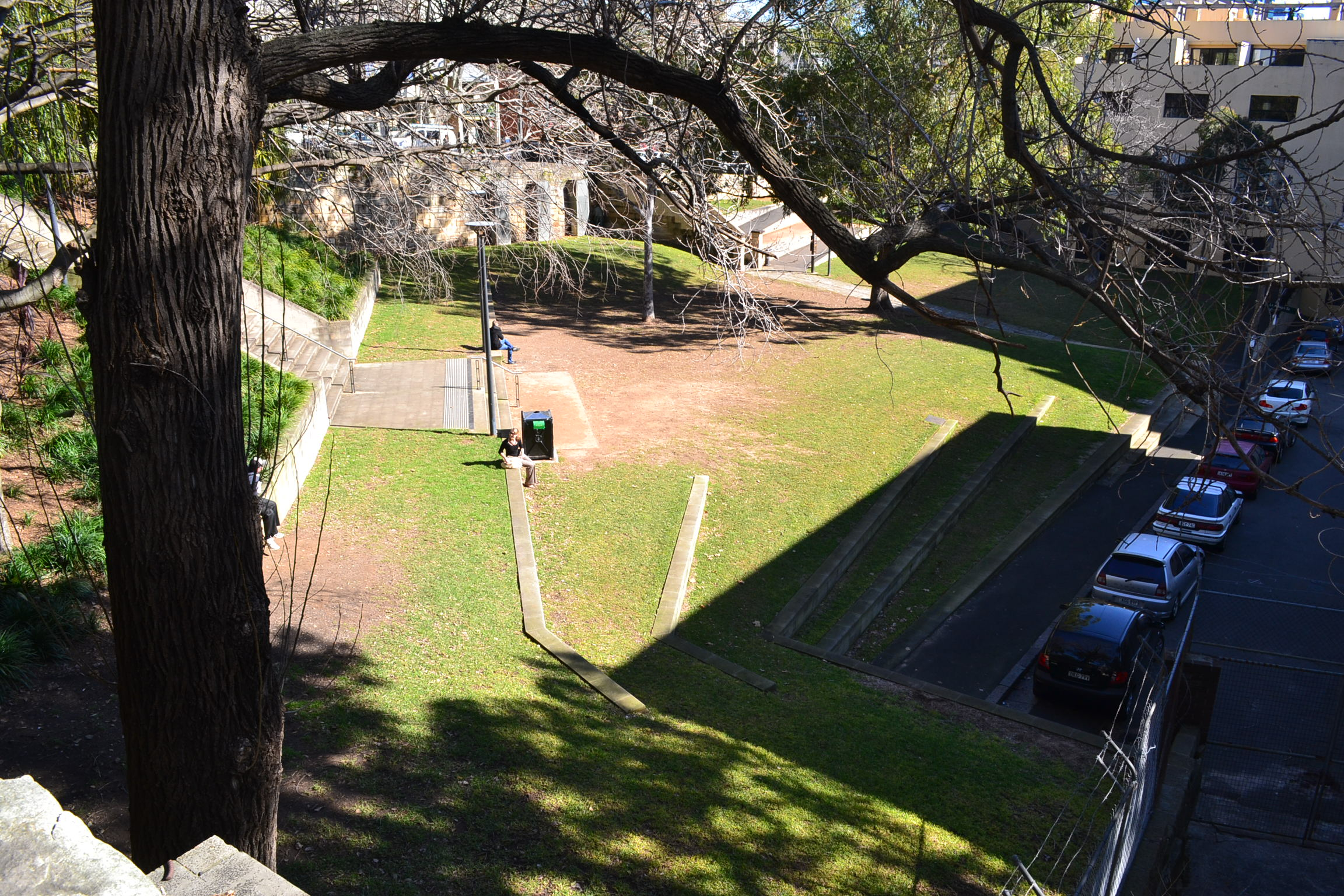
Frog Hollow Reserve

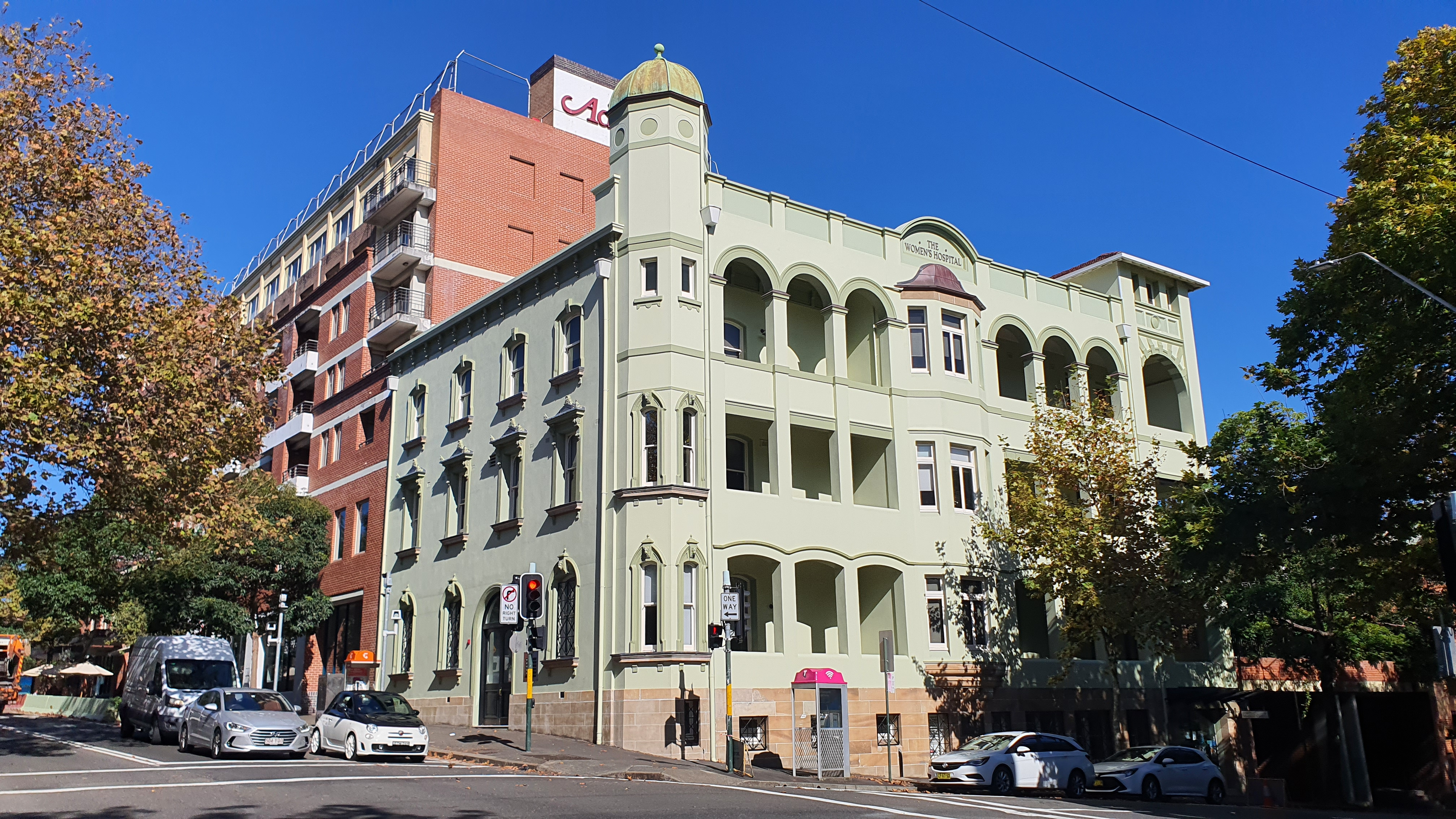
Crown Street Women's Hospital

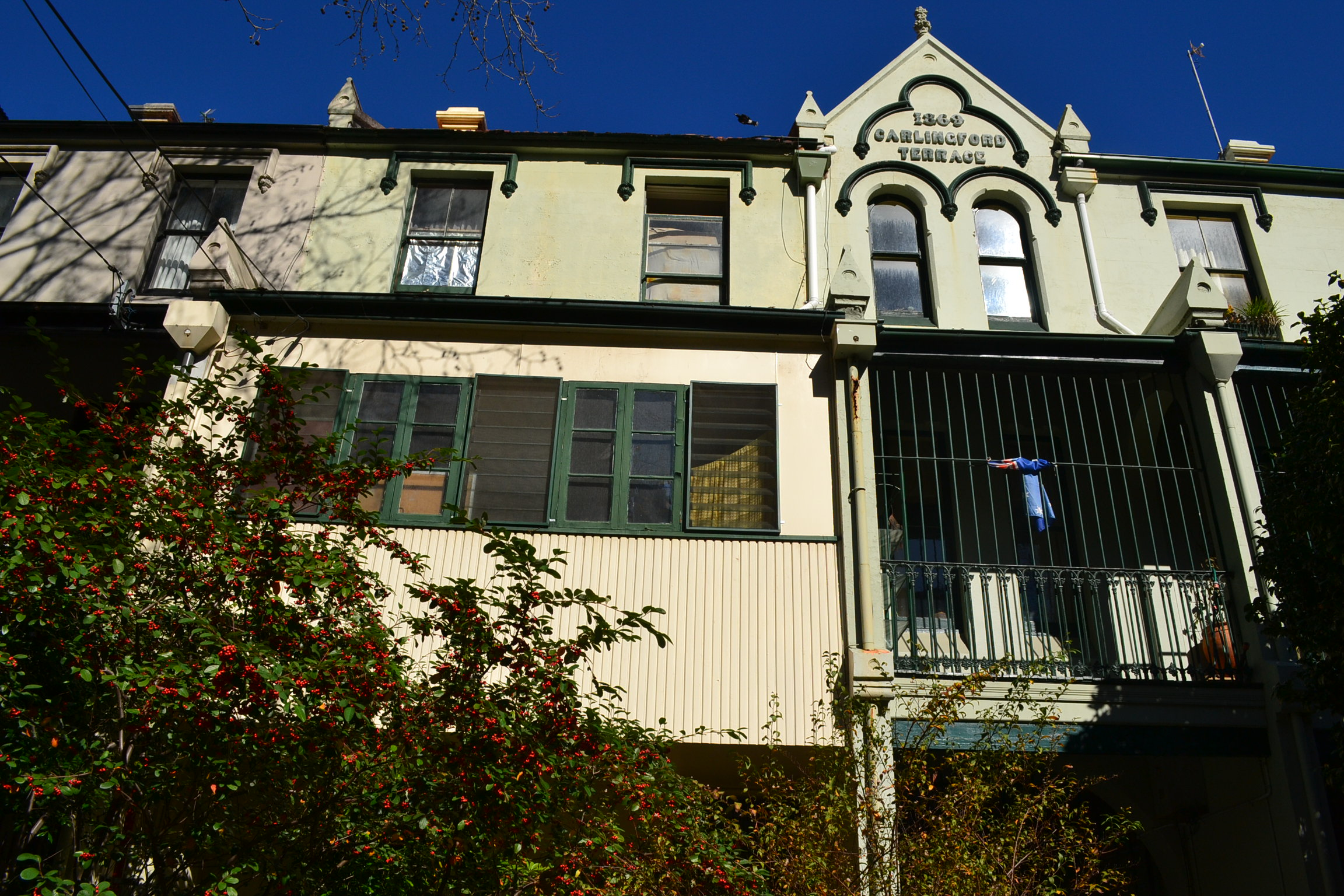
Carlingford Terrace

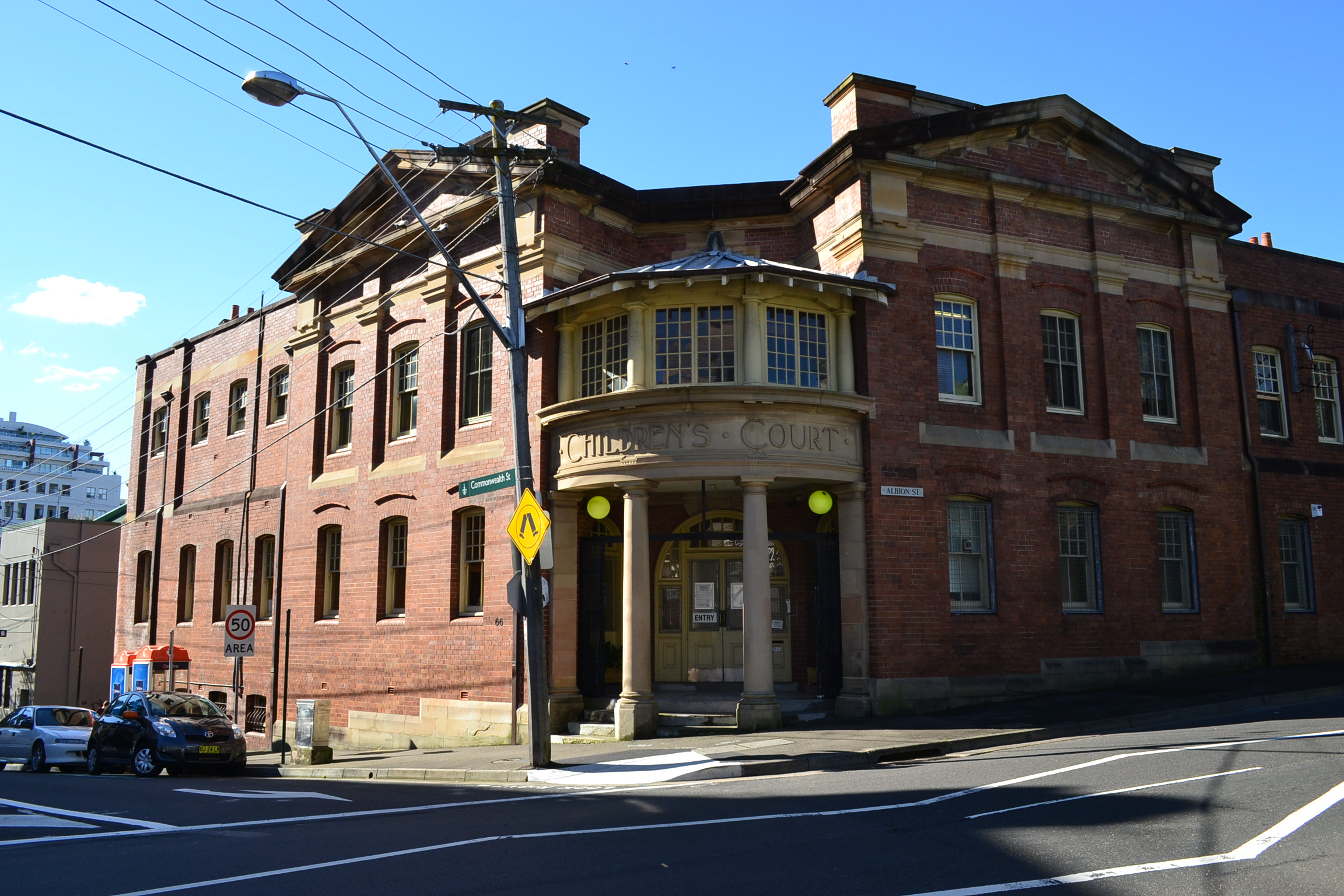
Children's Court

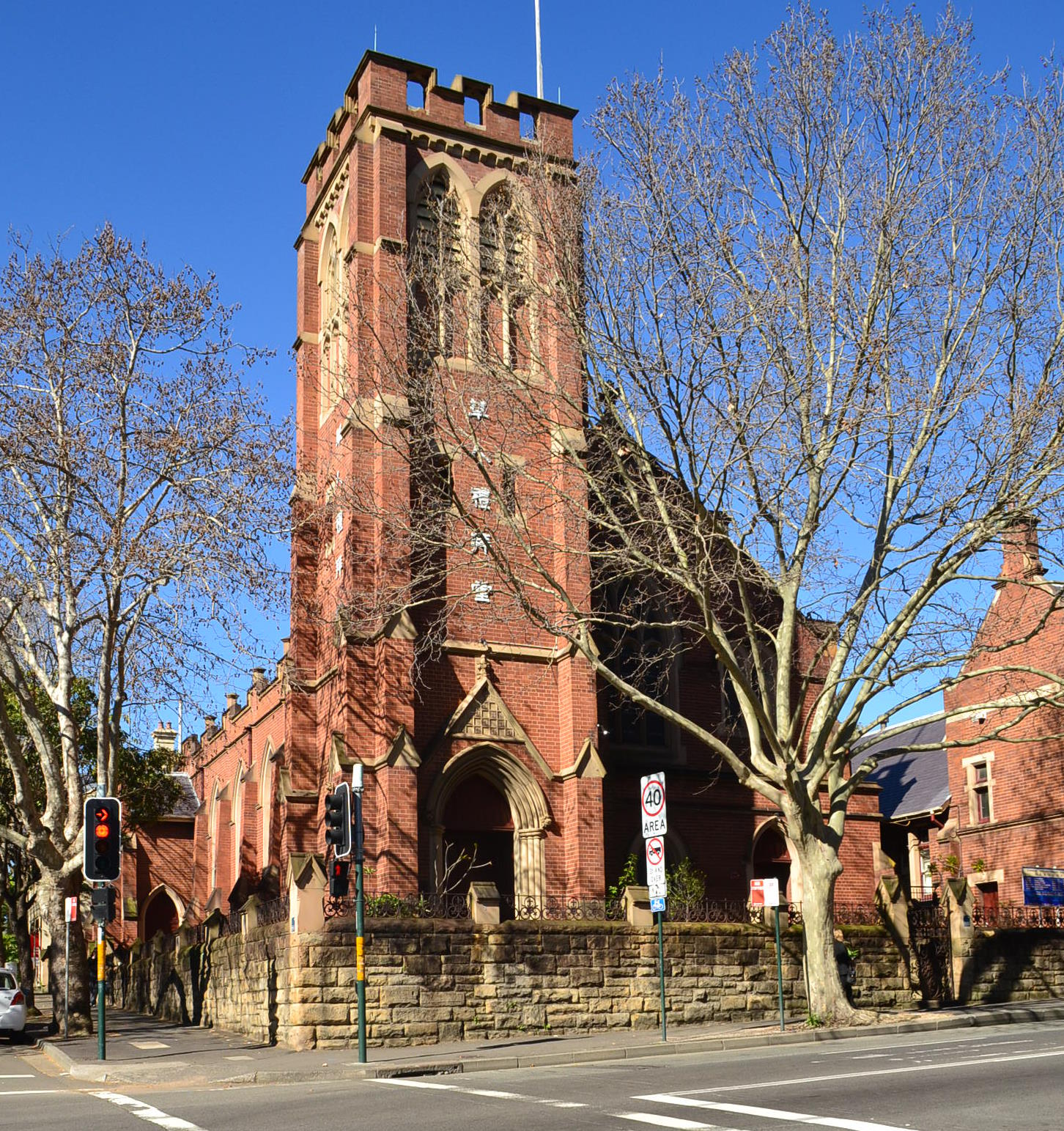
Chinese Presbyterian Church

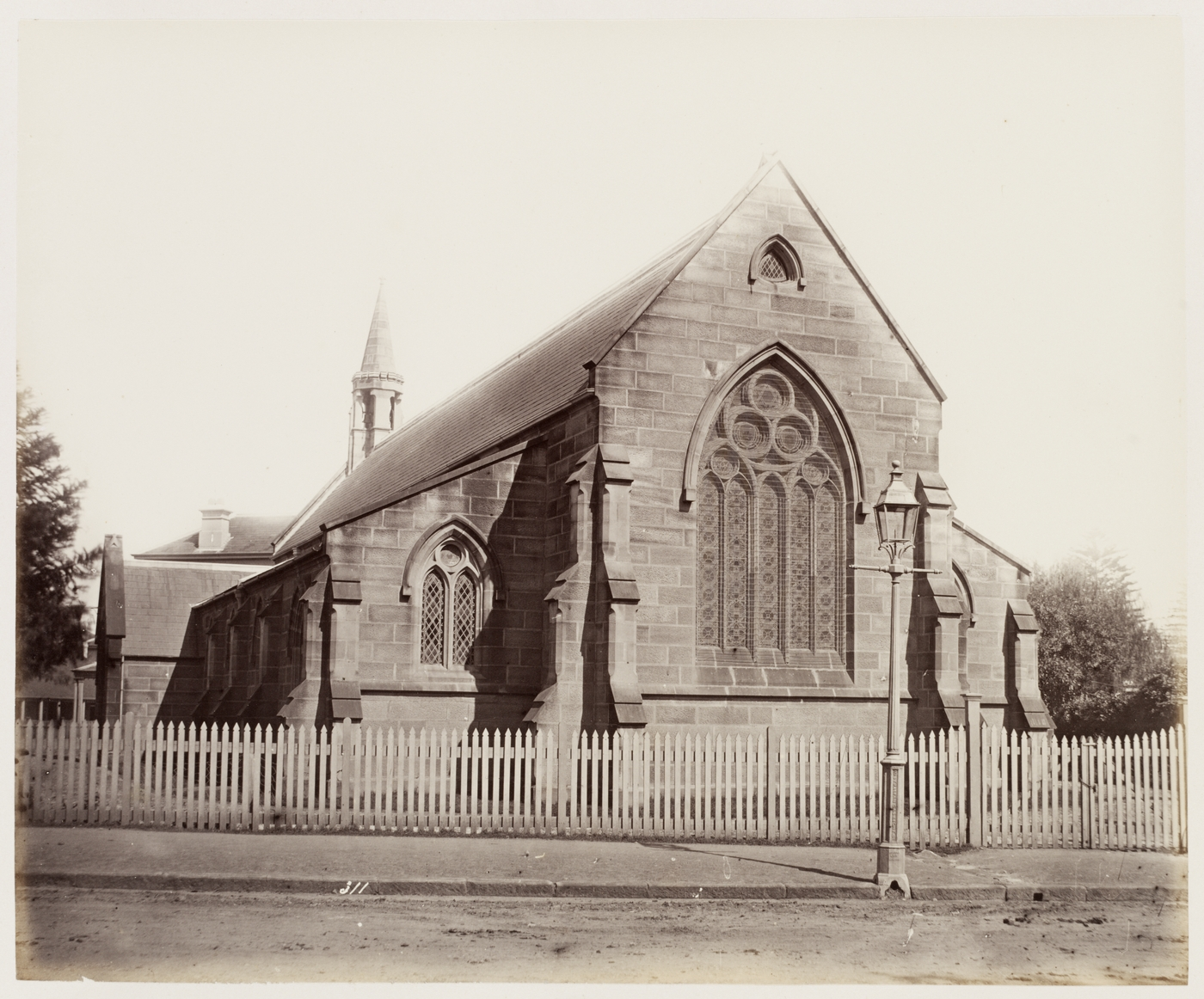
St Michael's Church 1872
