= Durham Hall =

Duham Hall may refer to:

- Durham Hall, Surry Hills, an historic house in Sydney, New South Wales
- Durham Hall, an academic building on the Campus of Virginia Tech
- Durham Hall, a home built by Moses Austin in Potosi, Missouri
