= John Wai =

John Wai may refer to:

- John Wai (canoeist) (born 1947), Hong Kong sprint canoeist
- John Young Wai (1847–1930), Australian Chinese community leader
