= Sally Haydon =

American academic

Sally Ann Haydon
- Born: February 10, 1959; Versailles, Kentucky
- Died: April 13, 2014 (aged 55)
- Education: Morehead State University; University of Kentucky; University of Arizona
- Scientific career
- Fields: Equine Science
- Workplaces: Midway College; Bluegrass Riding Academy; Sunrise Stables (Versailles, Kentucky)

Sally Haydon (February 10, 1959 – April 13, 2014) was an American professor of equine science and a trainer of American Saddlebred horses and riders. She was Chair of the Equine Studies department at Midway College in Midway, Kentucky, president and founder of the Intercollegiate Saddle Seat Riding Association (ISSRA), and the Owner/Director of Educational Programs at the Bluegrass Riding Academy. Haydon worked several years teaching saddle seat equitation with renowned trainer and author Helen Crabtree, and she was also a former board member of The Cleveland Home (at Cleveland House).
