= John Yu =

Chinese-Australian paediatrics doctor (born 1934)

John Yu AC FRACP FRSN
- 余森美
- Born: 12 December 1934 (age 91); Nanking, China
- Citizenship: Australian
- Education: University of Sydney
- Medical career
- Field: Paediatrics
- Institutions: Royal Alexandra Hospital for Children

John Samuel Yu (Chinese: 余森美; pinyin: Yú Sēnměi; born 12 December 1934) is a Chinese-born Australian paediatrician, hospital administrator, and art collector. He was CEO of the Royal Alexandra Hospital for Children in Sydney from 1979 until 1997, presiding over its move to Westmead. He was named Australian of the Year for 1996.

== Early life and education ==
John Samuel Yu was born in Nanking (now Nanjing, Jiangsu Province), China, on 12 December 1934. His father was a senior official in Chiang Kai-shek's National Revolutionary Army in what was the Republic of China, established when the Kuomintang came to power in 1912 (later moving to Taiwan). The family was forced to flee China in 1937, when Japan invaded China, occupying the country until 1945. Yu's mother was a Chinese Australian whose family had been in Australia since 1867. He had to be smuggled out of China at the age of two, hidden in a basket under bedclothes. He arrived in Sydney in 1939 with his mother and sister on a passenger ship from Hong Kong, with the family celebrating his third birthday outside Sydney Heads. He was carried ashore by Earle Page, who was a friend of his uncle who was briefly Prime Minister of Australia. His father fled to Taiwan and took a second wife there, legal at the time, and only made contact with his son after John's mother had died.

Yu's relatives has lived in Australia since the Victorian gold rush, and his grandfather was John Young Wai, who established the first Chinese Presbyterian Church in Sydney.

Yu attended Fort Street High School and the University of Sydney in Sydney, Australia, graduating with MB BS.

He also earned a Diploma of Child Health from the Royal College of Physicians in London at some point.

== Career ==
Yu started work at the Royal Alexandra Hospital for Children in 1961 (later officially called the New Children's Hospital, also known as The Children's Hospital at Westmead), at the age of 27. He was a staff physician at the hospital from 1972 to 1997, and chief executive of the New Children's Hospital at Westmead from 1978 to 1997. He was CEO of the Royal Alexandra Hospital for Children at the time of its relocation from inner-city Camperdown to Westmead in western Sydney in 1995 and was the driving force behind its relocation. Being an art lover, Yu's vision was "to create a best practice paediatric hospital that integrated art, design and high quality medical care for the benefit of young people".

He was chancellor and member of the council of the University of New South Wales from 2000 to July 2005.

Yu retired in 2014.

== Recognition and honours ==
Yu was appointed a Member of the Order of Australia in 1989, "For service to medicine, as a paediatrician and hospital administrator", and was promoted to Companion of the Order of Australia in 2001, "For service to the provision and development of 'state of the art' paediatric care and research, to children's rights, to education, and to the decorative and visual arts".

He was named Australian of the Year in 1996, at which point he said "I am proud of my Chinese heritage but even prouder to be an Australian".

He has been awarded several honorary degrees, including Hon. MD (USyd), Hon. DLitt (University of Western Sydney), and Hon. DSc (UNSW).

In 2004, artist Ah Xian created a celadon (glazed ceramic) bust of Yu, which is held by the National Portrait Gallery in Canberra. Art philanthropist Marilyn Darling funded the project.

In 2007, a portrait of Yu and his partner George Soutter by Xu Wang was a finalist for the 2007 Archibald Prize.

In 2019 he was elected a Fellow of the Royal Society of New South Wales.

He was made a fellow of the Royal Society of New South Wales (FRSN) in 2019. He was also a Fellow of the Royal Australasian College of Physicians (FRACP); of the Royal Australasian College of Medical Administrators (FRACMA); and of the Australian Academy of the Humanities.

Yu was designated a National Living Treasure of Australia in 2012.

In November 2022 he was invited to give the inaugural Wang Gungwu Lecture at the National Foundation for Australia–China Relations.

== Art ==
Yu's interest in art began as a child and while a student in Sydney, when he developed an interest in 18th century English ceramics. He later started taking an interest in East and Southeast Asian ceramics, and more specifically in decorative arts and textiles in the mid-1970s, after seeing an ikat textile for sale in a Sydney gallery. He believes that art is necessary for a healthy society, and created such an environment at Westmead Hospital.

From 2004, he was chair of VisAsia (the Australian Institute of Asian Culture and Visual Arts), which promotes the appreciation of Asian visual arts and culture. He and his partner accumulated a large collection of south-east Asian art. In 2014, some of their collection of Balinese textiles were exhibited in Australia and Indonesia. In 2021, 260 objects from their collection featured in an exhibition called Upacara: Ceremonial art from Southeast Asia at Mosman Art Gallery in Sydney.

He has also been a donor to The Australian Museum in Sydney.

== Other activities ==
From 2005 until at least 2013, Yu was a trustee of the Australian Cancer Research Foundation. He chaired or was a member of many other management boards and charitable organisations, including Musica Viva, Starlight Foundation, and the Art Gallery of New South Wales from 1997 to 2006, when he was made a Life Governor of the gallery. He chaired the Australia–China Council of the Department of Foreign Affairs from 2001 to 2006.

He has spoken up for refugees, pointing out that he was a "boat person", or irregular maritime arrival in Australia.

On 10 October 2023, Yu was one of 25 Australians of the Year who signed an open letter supporting the Yes vote in the Indigenous Voice referendum, initiated by psychiatrist Patrick McGorry.

Yu has published several books and many papers on paediatrics, hospital management, and the decorative arts.

== Personal life ==
Yu's life partner was eminent paediatrician and printmaker George Soutter (1934–2011). Soutter was born in Gwelo, Southern Rhodesia (now Gweru, Zimbabwe), and in 1959 graduated in medicine from the University of Cape Town, in South Africa, before undertaking further studies in London. After migrating to Australia in the 1960s, he met Yu at the Royal Alexandra Hospital.

Academic offices
| Preceded by Sir Anthony Mason | Chancellor of the University of New South Wales; 2000–2005 | Succeeded by David Gonski |
