= 203–205 Albion Street, Surry Hills =

203–205 Albion Street, Surry Hills Cottages
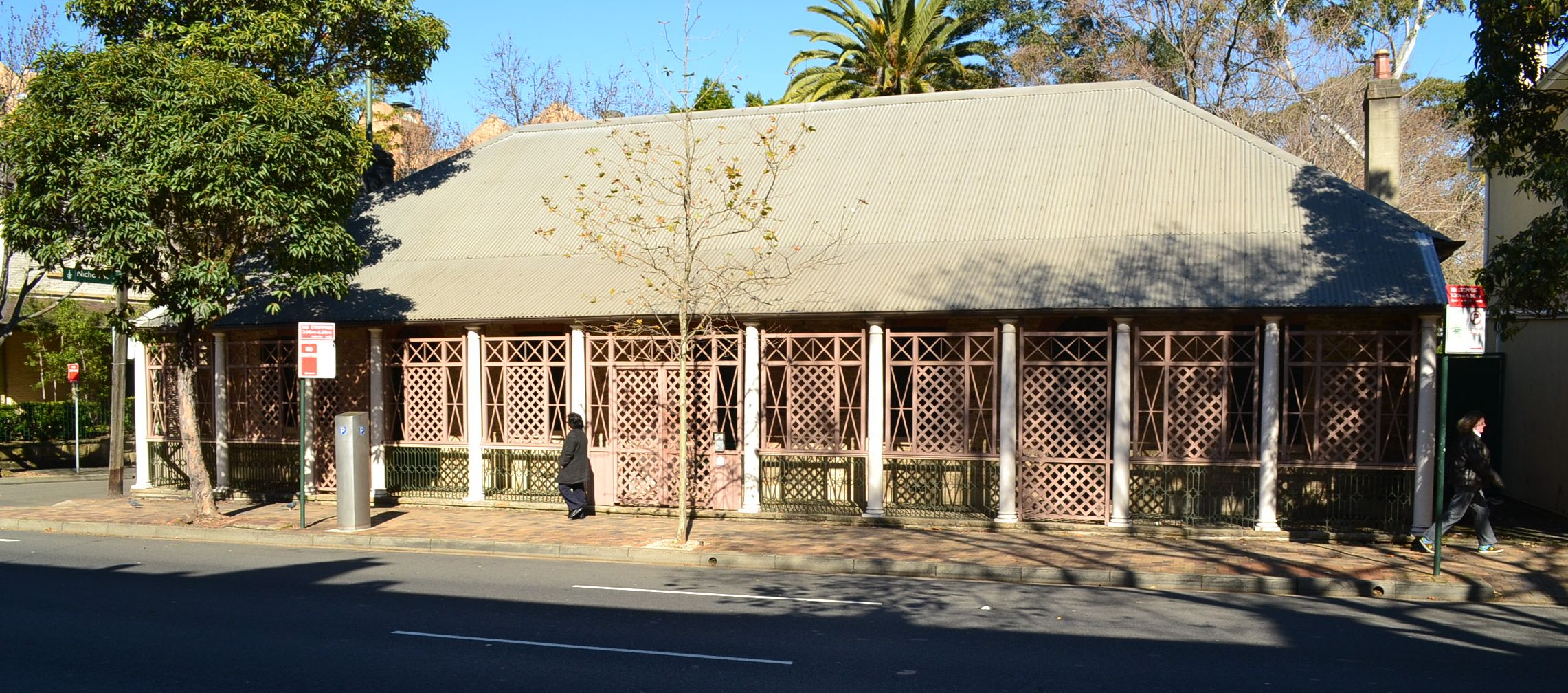
- The cottages, pictured in 2011

- Location within Sydney Location within Australia
- 33°53′03″S 151°13′00″E
- Location: 203–205 Albion Street, Surry Hills, City of Sydney, New South Wales, Australia

History
- Built: 1840
- Built for: George Hill

Site notes
- Architectural style: Colonial Georgian
- Owner: Royal College of Pathologists of Australasia

New South Wales Heritage Register
- Official name: Cottage
- Type: State heritage (built)
- Designated: 2 April 1999
- Reference no.: 443
- Type: Cottage
- Category: Residential buildings (private)
- Builders: George Hill (No 203)

The 203–205 Albion Street, Surry Hills Cottages are two heritage-listed cottages located at 203–205 Albion Street in the inner city Sydney suburb of Surry Hills in the City of Sydney local government area of New South Wales, Australia. It was built in 1840 by George Hill. The property is owned by the Royal College of Pathologists of Australasia. It was added to the New South Wales State Heritage Register on 2 April 1999.

== History ==
Governor Phillip established the boundary of the Sydney Cove settlement in 1792 when he drew a line from the head of Cockle Bay to the head of Woolloomooloo Bay. East of that line was reserved for the town and west of the line, which included present-day Surry Hills was considered suitable for farming and was granted to military officers and free settlers.

The first land grants in the Surry Hills area were made in the 1790s. Captain Joseph Foveaux received 42 hectares (105 acres) and Commissary John Palmer received 28 hectares (70 acres) in April and another adjoining 8.1 hectares (20 acres) soon after. He called the property George Farm and in 1800 Palmer also bought Foveaux's farm. Palmer supported Governor Bligh during the Rum Rebellion and returned to England to give evidence. On his return, his reduced financial circumstances forced the sale of his land.

The sale of Palmer's estate in 1814 was the first subdivision in Surry Hills. Other key dates include:

- 1814 (August) – Isaac Nichols bought Allotment 20, comprising over 2 hectares (6 acres) of John Palmer's estate.
- 1833 – Nichol's estate was subdivided and sold. George Hill bought the land upon which the Albion Street cottages now stand.
- c. 1840 – George Hill builds the cottage at 203 Albion Street.
- 1844 – 203 Albion Street was advertised to let and described as a 'house containing six rooms, detached kitchen and servants room over it, a good well of water and a piece of garden ground.
- 1845–1850 – The adjoining house at 205 was built.
- 1918 – The cottages were sketched by Hardy Wilson.
- By 1969 – The original front verandah had been replaced by a low brick balustraded wall and the timber verandah posts truncated. A photograph taken in 1969 shows the brick verandah wall with the end verandah screens missing (central screen is present).
- 1971 – Property was purchased by Woolloomooloo Rentals. A survey of this date showed courtyard with awnings? And No 205 had an attached rear weatherboard addition and brick outhouse.
- During the ownership by Woolloomooloo Rentals from 1971–1977 little work was carried out to the property and it remained empty.
- 1977 (late) – Property was purchased by McCulloch and Taylor to become Taylor's Restaurant. Its use as a restaurant was approved by City of Sydney Council.
- 1978 (early) – Restoration/reconstruction works began, assisted by Heritage Office funding along with associated works for conversion to restaurant use. Externally, the works included the reconstruction of the Albion Street verandah and construction of the rear verandah and the Nicols Street boundary wall. Interior works included the opening up of internal spaces, installation of fire-rated ceilings, the kitchen fit-out and extension of the attic to the west into the roof space.
- 1979 – Financial assistance from Heritage Office to continue restoration/reconstruction.
- 1980 (July) – Approval of Nicholas Street boundary wall.
- 1980 (March) – Main Cottage fitout as exists today, including:
  - Opening up of walls to No. 205
  - Reconstruction of rear door to window at No. 205
  - Kitech fitout to No. 205
  - Extension of atic with 2no. New western dormers.
  - Albion Street verandah columns, balustrade and flagging.
  - New Door between S1 and S7–8
  - New fire rated ceiling to replace existing square set ceiling (set lower perhaps covering 3no. Original? Beaded timber beams)
  - Fitout of Kitchen block including stair, lavatories and south east addition
  - Additions to Laundry (Johnstone Bridggs Cheong & Seale, Architects).
- 1980 (Sept) – Approval for construction of main cottage rear verandah.
- 1984 (Oct) – Barrel-vaulted glazed structure between main cottage and Kitchen block was constructed.
- 1985 – Interim PCO applied.
- 1986 – PCO applied.
- 1991 (Aug) – Approval of demolition of existing toilet structure addition to kitchen block and new addition. Works not carried out.
- 1996 (Nov) – Taylor's Restaurant ceased and the cottages were bought by the Royal College of Pathologiest of Australasia. Approval was granted for a change of use from restaurant to office.
- mid-2002 – The front verandah railings and end screens were removed to stop vagrancy and for security reasons.

== Description ==
203–205 Albion Street are a pair of simple cottages built separately in the 1840s and joined to appear as a single building in the 1850s. The site contains the main wing, kitchen wing and two small outbuildings.

The main wing comprises two single storey colonial sandstock brick cottages with attic accommodation, corrugated steel roof, front and rear stone flagged verandahs, shuttered 12 pane double hung sash windows with flat gauged arches and six panel front doors with Georgian style semi-circular fanlights over. The two cottages were originally built as two freestanding buildings, joined together by an early addition to form a row.

A two-storey sandstock brick kitchen block with shingled roof is located at the rear of the site. A single story glazed timber framed addition is attached on the south elevation.

A modern glazed, steel barred-vaulted pavilion is located between the main wing and kitchen wing.

Two outbuildings are also present, a brick and weatherboard laundry and store and a timber shadehouse/gazebo.

== Heritage listing ==
As at 2 June 2006, the cottages at 203–205 Albion Street, Surry Hills demonstrate the development of Surry Hills following the break up of the Palmer Estate in 1814. They survive as examples of the first phase of residential development in the area and belong to an important group of surviving Colonial Georgian buildings in Surry Hills.

Cottage was listed on the New South Wales State Heritage Register on 2 April 1999 having satisfied the following criteria.

The place is important in demonstrating the course, or pattern, of cultural or natural history in New South Wales.

The cottages demonstrate the development of Surry Hills following the break up of the Palmer Estate in 1814. They survive as examples of the first phase of residential development in the area and belong to an important group of surviving Georgian buildings in Surry Hills.

The place is important in demonstrating aesthetic characteristics and/or a high degree of creative or technical achievement in New South Wales.

The cottages retain many Georgian style features such as the sandstone verandah flagging, chimney pieces, doors, sash windows with shutters, one original staircase and semi-circular fanlights with glazing bars over the doors. They represent good examples of a simple Georgian colonial building style, relatively intact.

There are also examples of "storey and a half" cottages, a common colonial building form that was discontinued after about 1860.

The front verandah screens, although reconstructed, are now rare architectural features of the colonial period.

The cottages also make a significant contribution to the streetscape of Albion Street and form a group with other nearby examples of Georgian style buildings.

The place has potential to yield information that will contribute to an understanding of the cultural or natural history of New South Wales.

The cottages display considerable archaeological potential and have some potential for research into early building techniques.

The place possesses uncommon, rare or endangered aspects of the cultural or natural history of New South Wales.

The cottages are representative examples of simple Georgian style buildings. They are rare in Surry Hills and part of a surviving group of Georgian style buildings in Surry Hills.

== See also ==
- Durham Hall, Surry Hills
