= 86–88 Windmill Street, Millers Point =

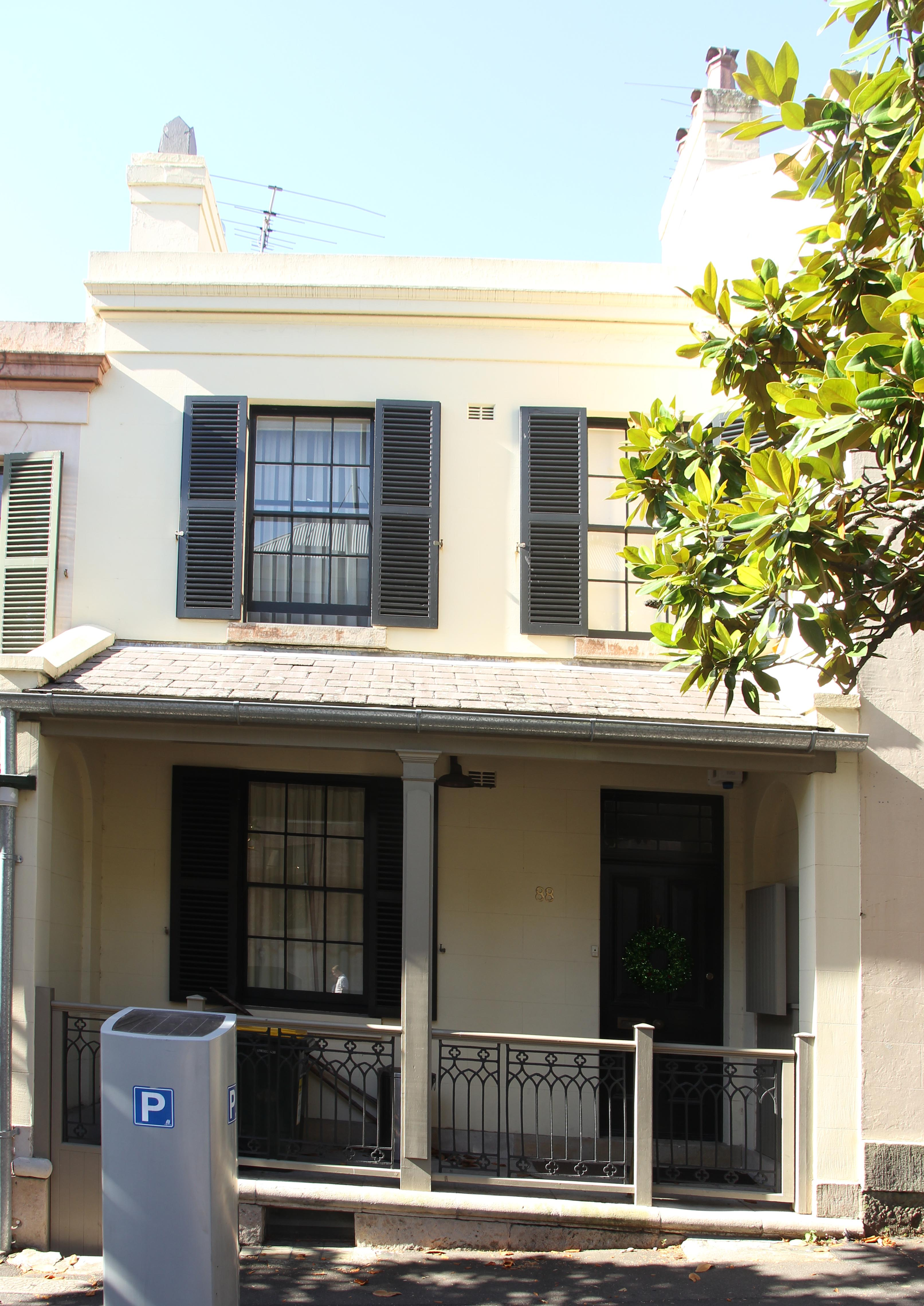
- 88 Windmill Street, pictured in 2019.

- Location within Sydney Location within Australia
- 33.8575°S 151.2057°E
- Location: 86–88 Windmill Street, Millers Point, City of Sydney, New South Wales, Australia

History
- Built: c. 1860

Site notes
- Architectural style: Victorian Georgian

New South Wales Heritage Register
- Official name: Terrace
- Type: State heritage (built)
- Designated: 2 April 1999
- Reference no.: 897
- Type: Terrace
- Category: Residential buildings (private)

86–88 Windmill Street, Millers Point is a heritage-listed residence located at 86–88 Windmill Street, in the inner city Sydney suburb of Millers Point in the City of Sydney local government area of New South Wales, Australia. It was added to the New South Wales State Heritage Register on 2 April 1999.

== History ==
Millers Point is one of the earliest areas of European settlement in Australia, and a focus for maritime activities. One of two Victorian Georgian style terrace houses constructed c. 1860.

== Description ==
Georgian style Victorian two-storey townhouse with four bedrooms, ground-floor verandah, attic and basement. Shutters to all windows, cast-iron panels to verandah balustrading. Storeys: 2 Construction: Painted rendered masonry, slate roof. Painted timber joinery. Iron lace balustrade. Style: Victorian Georgian.

Nos 86–88 Windmill Street are two of a terrace of three Georgian terrace houses modelled on the masonry terrace houses of British cities and closely following the planning, size, facade design and construction of the standard urban housing in Britain. The three houses in the terrace (Nos. 84, 86 and 88) appear to be part of a larger terrace including the two houses at either end (Nos. 82 and 90). However, the documentary evidence and closer inspection on site demonstrates that the three townhouses at Nos. 84–88 were constructed first as a stand-alone terrace and that Nos. 82 and 90 were constructed after. Nos. 82 and 90 are both freestanding houses sharing no walls with the original houses at Nos. 84–86. The unified design of the five houses probably indicates a high degree of cooperation between the three owners of the five houses and the general level of skill of builders and tradesmen.

=== Condition ===
External: Good

== Heritage listing ==
As at 23 November 2000, this is one of a pair of Georgian style Victorian townhouses, having high streetscape value. It is part of the Millers Point Conservation Area, an intact residential and maritime precinct. It contains residential buildings and civic spaces dating from the 1830s and is an important example of 19th century adaptation of the landscape. The pair of houses at Nos 86-88 Windmill Street, part of a larger group built by the Musgrave family, is of State significance as a rare surviving example of a modest group containing a shop and residences dating from the late 1850s, and are an integral part of the Millers Point and Dawes Point Village Precinct Conservation Area. This pair of houses forms part of a group of buildings constructed in stages by the Musgrave family from c. 1856 until 1861, containing their business premises (No. 84), family residences and additional residences that could be let. The Musgrave family's move to the lower North Shore indicates not only their increasing wealth, but also the tendency in the 1870s and 1880s of the middle classes to move to the suburbs, retaining their town properties simply as an investment.

This pair of houses forms an integral part of the small commercial area at the eastern end of Windmill Street that developed to serve the local area, as well as sailors and ferry goers. As individual buildings, they are highly significant as rare surviving examples of the modest Colonial Georgian houses, demonstrating the effect of the Sydney and London Building Acts which sought to control the spread of fire by controlling the materials and design of town houses in tight urban environments. The buildings show the transition from English Georgian to Colonial Georgian styles, employing decorative metal work imported from England in forms modified to suit the Australian climate. The surviving original architectural elements of the three buildings built by the Musgraves are an important record of modest Colonial Georgian architecture, including the cedar joinery, fanlights and cast iron. The surviving cast-iron work is a typical early nineteenth-century pattern, which can still be found in London and elsewhere in Millers Point. The configuration of the passage to the rear lane, with its staircase, is unusual, and no other similar examples have been identified; most passages occur at street level (as can be seen in Kent Street).

This pair of houses forms an integral part of the Colonial Georgian townscape of Millers Point, one of the most intact surviving colonial townscapes in Australia. The housing in the block between Argyle Place and Windmill Street is of a higher density than most of the other surviving early townscapes. This group, at the eastern end of Windmill Street, including the early public houses and the shop at No. 67 Windmill Street, is very important as an example of a Colonial Georgian townscape. The individual buildings are important as they retain original details. This pair of houses exemplifies the adaptive re-use of the Colonial Georgian housing stock inherited by the Department of Housing from the MSB in the 1980s, with modern rear wings attached to the back of houses that were originally planned without internal bathrooms. The pair of houses is an excellent indication of the standard of buildings retained by the Sydney Harbour Trust following the resumption of the area in the early twentieth century.

86–88 Windmill Street, Millers Point was listed on the New South Wales State Heritage Register on 2 April 1999 having satisfied the following criteria.

The place is important in demonstrating the course, or pattern, of cultural or natural history in New South Wales.

Evidence of the small commercial area that developed at the eastern end of Windmill Street, containing shops and public houses which catered to the local residents, sailors and ferrygoers.

The place has a strong or special association with a person, or group of persons, of importance of cultural or natural history of New South Wales's history.

Associated with the commercial activities of the Musgrave family, containing their business premises, residences and houses intended to be rented. The family were associated with the area for over half a century.

The place is important in demonstrating aesthetic characteristics and/or a high degree of creative or technical achievement in New South Wales.

Although three separate buildings, the group at Nos 82-90 Windmill Street appears as one building, indicating that the form and details were in common usage in the 1850s. The high standard of construction resulted in the retention of the larger houses following the Darling Harbour Resumption. The demolition of the smaller houses at the rear provides an indication of the cut off point between retention and demolition.

The place has a strong or special association with a particular community or cultural group in New South Wales for social, cultural or spiritual reasons.

The long-term residents have a strong attachment to the place and its townscape, as demonstrated by their involvement with the Green Bans. One of the first areas to be recognised (and included in a planning scheme) as being significant for its townscape.

The place has potential to yield information that will contribute to an understanding of the cultural or natural history of New South Wales.

There is considerable research potential relating to the development of the building group and the development of the commercial area at the eastern end of Windmill Street as a whole, as well as the commercial activities of the Musgrave family.

The place possesses uncommon, rare or endangered aspects of the cultural or natural history of New South Wales.

A building form once common throughout Sydney by 1850, this group of late Georgian style terrace houses are among the very few to survive; the main concentration of the type are within the area resumed in 1900. These houses have been in public ownership for over a century, and have undergone few alterations externally (with the exception of the rear wings).

The place is important in demonstrating the principal characteristics of a class of cultural or natural places/environments in New South Wales.

This scale and character of building once characterised the inner ring of suburbs (Woolloomooloo, Surry Hills Chippendale, Pyrmont and Ultimo), however a large proportion of the 1850s building stock has been demolished. A representative example of the urban renewal projects undertaken by the Department of Housing in the mid 1980s, with rear wings added to the rear of houses.

== See also ==
- 82–84 Windmill Street
- 90–92 Windmill Street
