= Midway University =

Christian liberal arts university in Midway, Kentucky, US

Coordinates: 38.14611°N 84.67889°W

- Former names: Kentucky Female Orphan School (1847–1942); Pinkerton High School and Midway Junior College (1942–1978); Midway College (1978–2015)
- Motto: Ama Vicinum Acte
- Type: Private university
- Established: 1847; 179 years ago
- Accreditation: Southern Association of Colleges and Schools Commission on Colleges (SACSCOC)
- Religious affiliation: Christian Church (Disciples of Christ)
- Endowment: $22.7 million (2020)
- President: John P. Marsden
- Total staff: 326
- Students: 2,003
- Undergraduates: 1,266
- Postgraduates: 251
- Location: Midway, Kentucky, United States
- Campus: 200 acres (81 ha); Rural
- Colors: Blue & gold
- Nickname: Eagles
- Sporting affiliations: NAIA – River States – MSC – IHSA
- Mascot: Eagle
- Website: www.midway.edu

Midway University is a private Christian university in Midway, Kentucky, United States. Related by covenant to the Christian Church (Disciples of Christ), it enrolls approximately 2,000 students earning associate, bachelor's, and master's degrees. Midway began as an orphan school for female students in 1847 and over the decades evolved from a high school, to a junior college, and then a four-year women's college, the only one in Kentucky. The college became a university in July 2015 and in the fall of 2016 became fully coeducational.

== History ==
Midway University was founded on October 3, 1849, as the Kentucky Female Orphan School with one teacher and sixteen female students. The nine members of the board of trustees oversaw the school's endowment, the building, and five acres of land.

=== Kentucky Female Orphan School (19th century) ===
The co-founders of the school were L.L. (Lewis Letig) Pinkerton, minister of the Midway Christian Church (Disciples of Christ) from 1844 to 1860, and James Ware Parrish, a Midway Christian Church elder. They obtained a charter on February 23, 1847, from the Kentucky legislature through the help of Kentucky Senator Major George W. Williams. Before the school was permitted to open, an endowment of twenty-five thousand dollars had to be secured and investments made. This time was used for soliciting funds, purchasing land, construction of a building, and drafting and outline of government and management for the school.

John Dawson was superintendent and his wife, Mary, was matron when the Kentucky Female Orphan School opened in 1849. Associate principal and assistant matron, Eliza Davies, wrote that in those early days the "house was not furnished; the girls slept on straw mattresses; the floors were uncarpeted."

The Kentucky Female Orphan School girls' education was directed by four main points:

1. The development and corroboration of the moral constitution.
2. The improvement of the intellectual powers.
3. The development of the physical powers.
4. Such direction of all the capabilities and attainments of the pupils, as will afford them the best prospect of a livelihood, in the useful and honorable employment of their requirements.

The early years of operation had four grades. They were compared to an intensive high school education which included all courses: Ray's Higher Arithmetic, two years of algebra, plane geometry, trigonometry, physics, botany, physiology, psychology, astronomy, physical geography, chemistry, geology, mineralogy, zoology, grammar, spelling, diacritical marks, rhetoric, American and English Literature, classics, U.S. History, English history, ancient history, medieval history, modern history, Latin, and instrumental and vocal music. Sixteen credits were required to graduate but according to the school president Lucy Peterson many students graduated with twenty-five credits.

=== Midway College ===
The school served, at various times, as an elementary and high school, eventually became Midway Junior College, and in the 1970s became a fully accredited baccalaureate-granting women's college as Midway College. In 2010, the school announced the launching of the Midway College School of Pharmacy in Paintsville, Kentucky. The plan was abandoned the next year due to higher than expected startup costs and failure to secure accreditation. Graduate programs began in 2008 with a Master of Business Administration. The Master of Education was added in 2013 and the Master of Science in Nursing was launched in 2016.

=== Midway University ===
On July 1, 2015, the college changed its name to Midway University. In the fall semester of 2016, the university transitioned to fully coeducational in its traditional daytime undergraduate programs and opened its residence halls to men.

== Campus ==
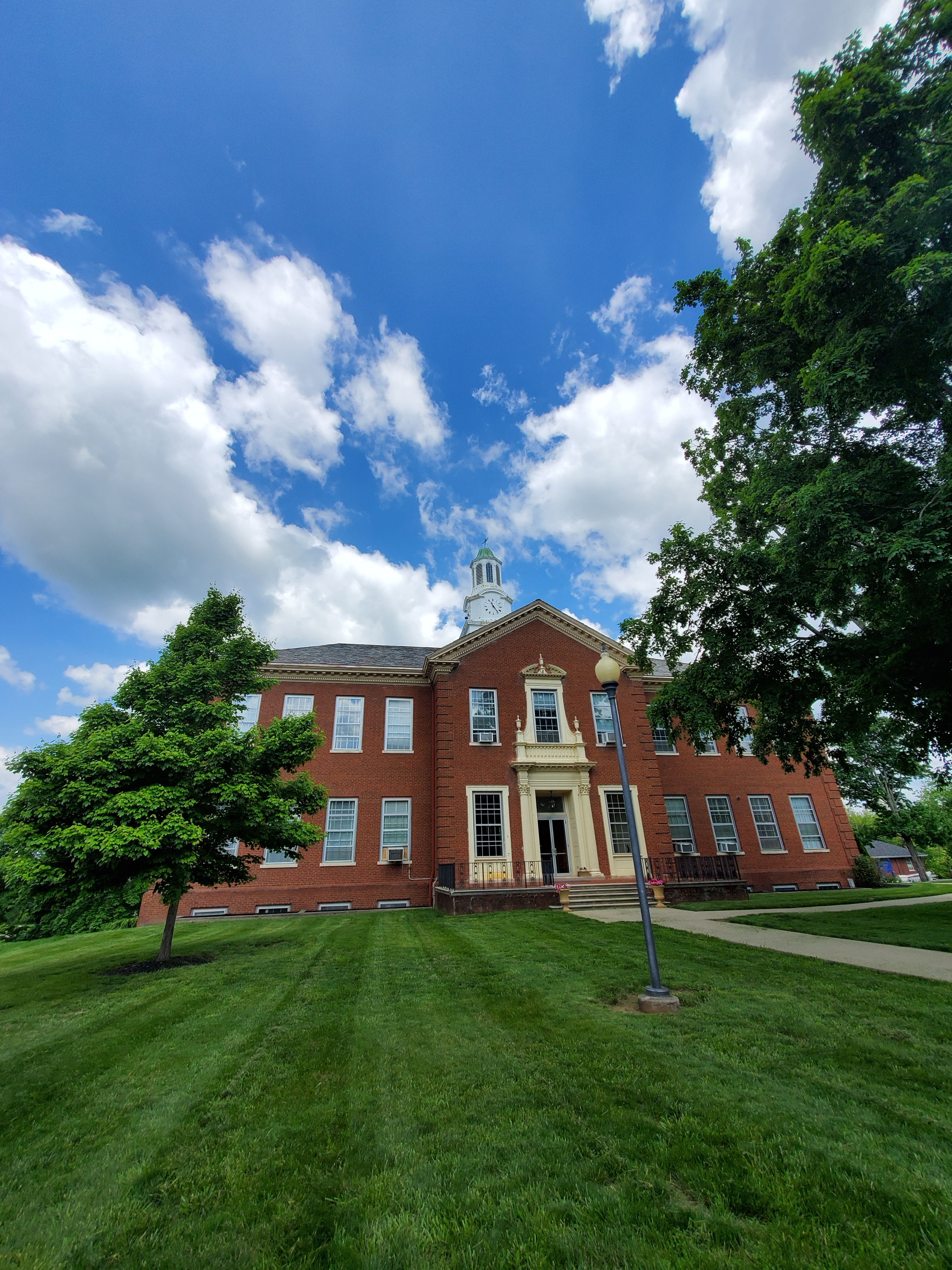
Marrs Hall

The school is located on a 200-acre (0.81 km^{2}) working farm in the heart of the Kentucky Bluegrass region. The campus overlooks Midway, a small town in central Kentucky. Established by officials of the Lexington and Ohio Railroad in 1835, its houses are stately examples of the finest in Greek revival. The National Park Service placed Pinkerton Hall, the oldest building on campus, on the National Register of Historic Places on November 20, 1974.

=== Academic buildings ===
- Equine Education Center is a 36,000-square foot facility housing a 105-foot (32 m) x 235-foot (72 m) indoor riding arena, eight stalls, laboratory, classroom, a large tack room, audio-visual room, wash stall, and faculty offices.
- Bud's Barn and Spy Coast Equine Education Center was completed in August 2022. The 5,376-square foot facility is adjacent to the Midway University Equestrian Center overlooking the main campus and creates an equine hub on the north side of campus. This facility includes Bud's Barn barn with 18 stalls, tack room, feed room, and a 60x40 education center classroom.
- Ashland Equine Barn and Theurkauf outdoor riding arena contains eight stalls, office space, and a washroom. The riding arena measures 227 x 117 feet and has a stonedust footing.
- Marrs Hall (1941), with a clock tower, houses the Arthur Young Lloyd Board Room, and the Office of the President, Office of Advancement, and Alumni Relations on the first floor. The building was renovated 2020 and houses the university's Welcome Center on the top floor which includes the Admissions Office, Business Office, and Financial Aid, making this a one-stop location for prospective students and their families. The lower-level houses the Accounting, Human Resources and Marketing offices.
- The Starks Center (STK) was built in 2010 and serves as the main classroom building on campus. The building houses three conference rooms, five academic suites, 48 faculty and staff offices, and a student lounge for a total of 30,242 square feet. The offices of the Vice President for Academic Affairs, the Office of the Registrar, the Assistant Vice President for Research and Training, the Director of Institutional Research, and the Deans and faculty of the School of Arts and Sciences and the School of Business, Equine, and Sport Studies are in the Starks Center. The Office of Student Success is located on the first floor of this building, where students can find academic support and career services. The Campus Health Clinic and the Office of Information Technology are on the lower level.
- Anne Hart Raymond Center for Mathematics, Science & Technology (AHR) opened in the fall 2003 semester. A 46,000-square-foot (4,300 m^{2}) building with laboratories for biology, anatomy, microbiology/immunology, botany, physics, chemistry, and physical/environmental science. Faculty members and upper-level students have access to dedicated laboratory space to pursue more advanced research projects. Additionally, the building has a 450-seat auditorium, classrooms, and faculty offices.
- The Hunter Field House is a 20,000 square foot athletic building that opened in June 2020, and includes an auxiliary gymnasium, a weight and cardio room, an elevated walking track, two locker rooms, an athlete study room, coaches’ offices, and meeting space. The Hunter Field House is used mostly for athletic practices and some special events. The Hunter Field House was made possible by a donation of Midway University trustee Janet Green Hunter and her husband Richard.
- The Little Memorial Library was built in 1997 and named in memory of W. Paul Little and Lucille C. Little. The first floor of the library houses the university's library collection, the Robert T. McCowan/Ashland Inc. Computing Center, the Duke Conference Room, and student study spaces. The lower level of the library houses the Communication Center, Security Office, study rooms, classrooms, the e-Sports center, and an academic computer lab. The second floor is the newly renovated Library Hall, a residential space.

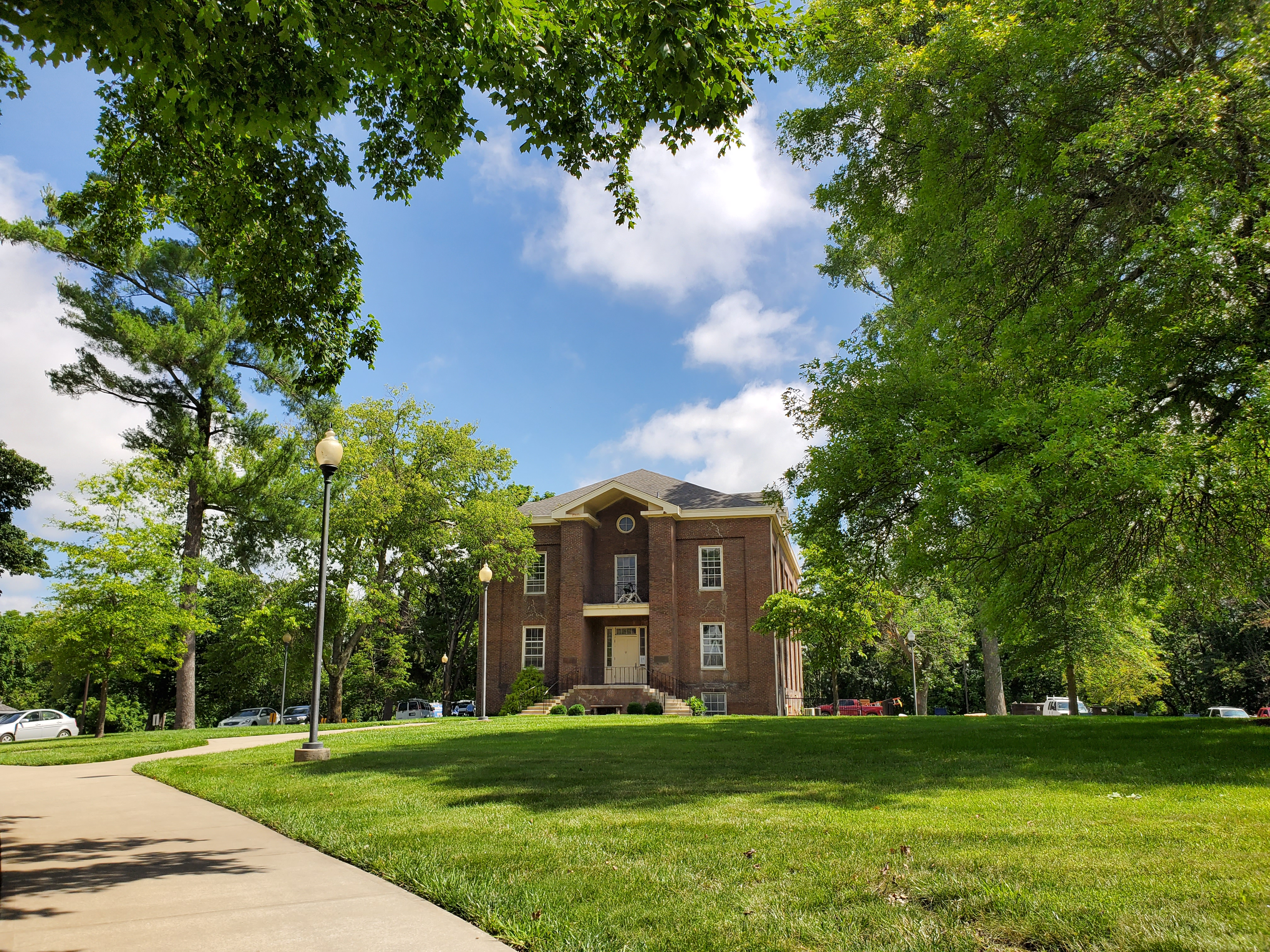
Historic Pinkerton Hall

=== Residential buildings ===
- Buster Hall offers traditional-style rooms with pod-style bathrooms on each floor and new laundry facility on the main floor (renovated in 2021) . This is the largest residence hall. (2).
- Belle Wisdom Hall houses students in suite-style rooms, sharing private bathrooms with 2–4 residents. Belle is the oldest dorm on the campus.
- Pinkerton Hall was the first building on campus and housed all the functions of the Kentucky Female Orphan School before being converted to offices. The building was renovated in Summer 2019 to return it to housing.
- Library Hall (2023) came into existence in 2023 when the second floor of Little Memorial Library was converted into residential space. The hall accommodates 43 students and includes a common breakroom, lounge, and a private study room.

== Athletics ==
The Midway athletic teams are called the Eagles. The college is a member of the National Association of Intercollegiate Athletics (NAIA), primarily competing in the River States Conference (RSC) for most of its sports since the 1991–92 academic year. Its men's & women's bowling, men's & women's swimming, men's volleyball and men's wrestling teams compete in the Mid-South Conference (MSC). Formerly a women's institution, men's sports were added into the Eagles' athletic program since the 2016–17 academic year.

Midway competes in 28 intercollegiate varsity sports: Men's sports include baseball, basketball, bowling, cross country, golf, soccer, sprint football, swimming, tennis, track & field, volleyball and wrestling; women's sports include basketball, bowling, cross country, golf, soccer, softball, swimming, tennis, track & field, volleyball, and wrestling, and co-ed sports include archery, cheer, eSports, and equestrian (hunt seat, western and Dressage).

One of the most recently added sports is sprint football, a weight-restricted form of American football not governed by the NAIA or the National Collegiate Athletic Association (NCAA). Midway began play in 2022 as one of six charter members of the Midwest Sprint Football League.

== Notable people ==
=== Alumni ===
- Hadley Duvall, reproductive rights advocate

=== Faculty ===
- Sally Haydon
- Bob Heleringer
