= 90–92 Windmill Street, Millers Point =

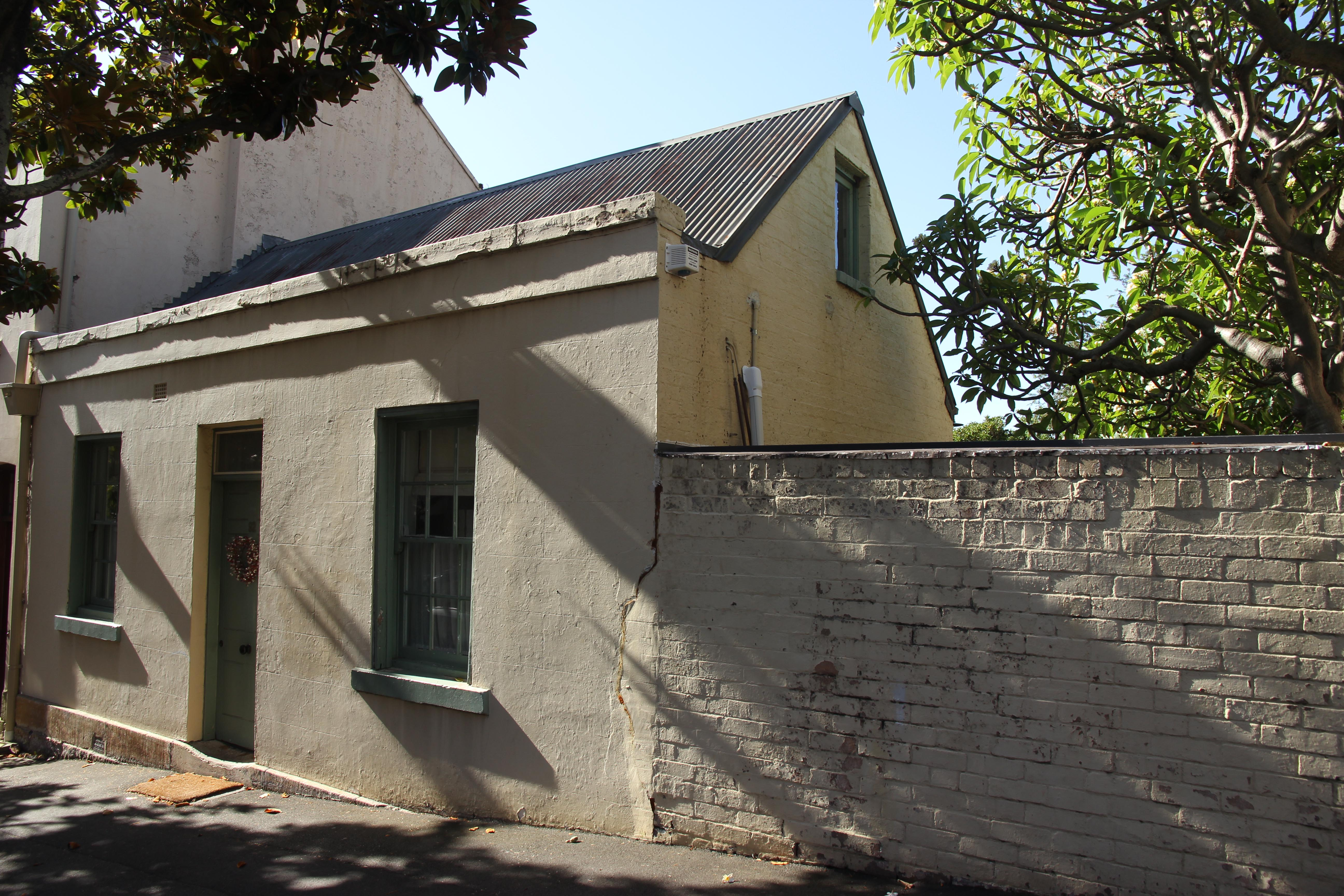
- 92 Windmill Street, pictured in 2019.

- Location within Sydney Location within Australia
- 33.8575°S 151.2059°E
- Location: 90–92 Windmill Street, Millers Point, City of Sydney, New South Wales, Australia

History
- Built: c. 1850s

Site notes
- Architectural style: Colonial Georgian

New South Wales Heritage Register
- Official name: Building
- Type: State heritage (built)
- Designated: 2 April 1999
- Reference no.: 847 / 849
- Type: Historic site

90–92 Windmill Street, Millers Point is a heritage-listed historic site located at 90–92 Windmill Street, in the inner city Sydney suburb of Millers Point in the City of Sydney local government area of New South Wales, Australia. It was added to the New South Wales State Heritage Register on 2 April 1999.

== History ==
A group of six Colonial Georgian style buildings built in the 1850s of stuccoed brick with twelve pane shuttered windows, pitched slate roofs behind parapets and all two bays wide except the cottage, which is three bays. The site was granted to William Davis as Allotment 2, Section 90 on 31 December 1834.

== Description ==
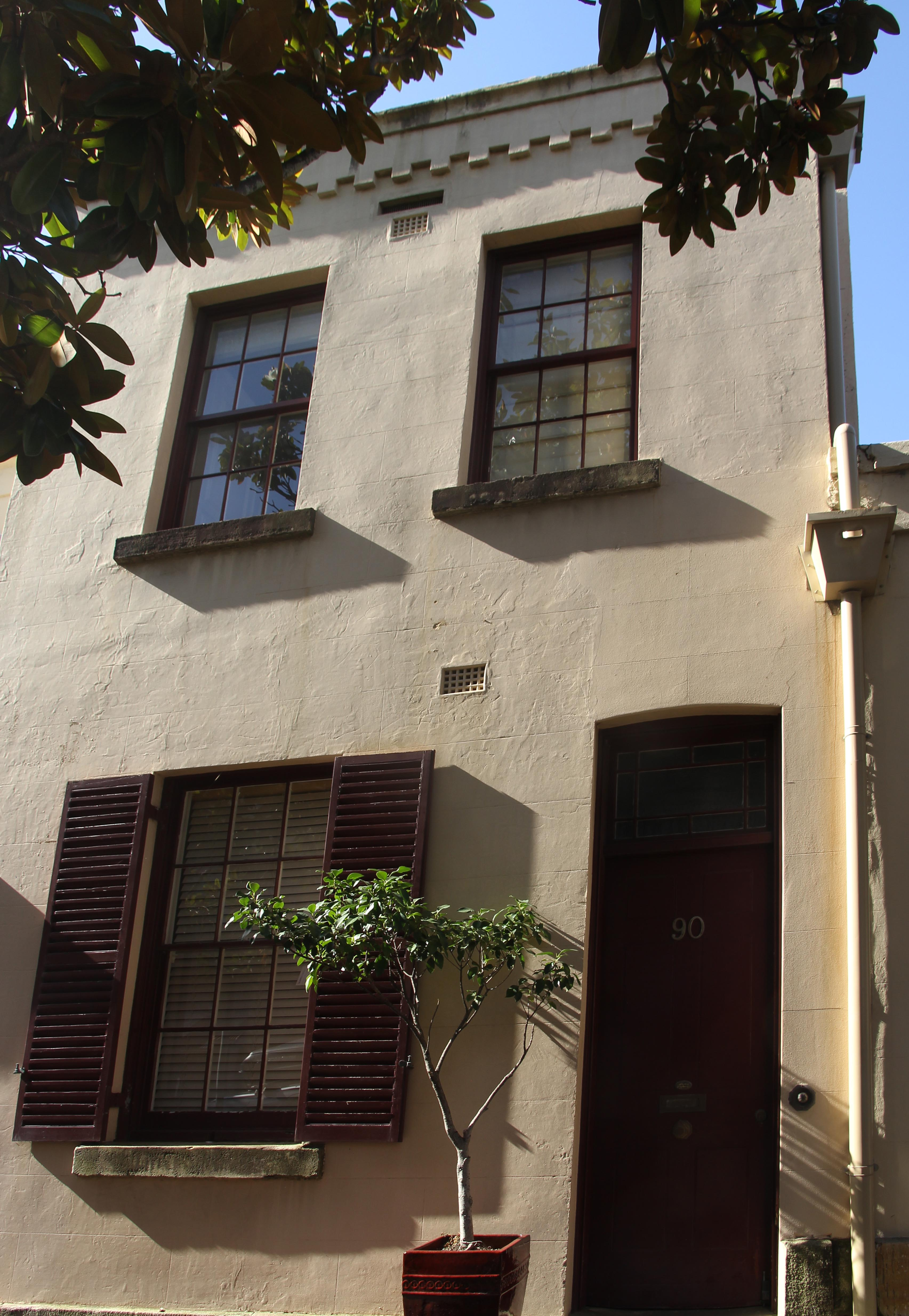
90 Windmill Street, pictured in 2019.

Located within the Millers Point historic district. A flush fronted house built on the street alignment and has a dentilled brick parapet like No. 82. Unfortunately the front door has been replaced.

=== Condition ===
A fine early Millers Point group of dwellings with shop that remain little changed externally and which serve to create a fine 19th century stepped streetscape. No. 90 Windmill Street is a two-storey terrace house with basements that is largely intact and pre-dates 1862. No. 92 Windmill Street is a single-storey brick house that is terraced into the hillslope of a similar age.

=== Modifications and dates ===
External joinery replaced in a traditional style. Facade re-rendered and painted. The front door has been replaced. In process of sale to private purchaser.

== Heritage listing ==
As at 23 November 2000, 90–92 Windmill Street is part of the Millers Point Conservation Area, an intact residential and maritime precinct. It contains residential buildings and civic spaces dating from the 1830s and is an important example of 19th century adaptation of the landscape. Of environmental significance for its contribution to an architecturally diverse and historically important residential streetscape. Of historical significance as physical evidence of the development of the area with a diverse range of terrace style housing in the mid-late 19th century.

90–92 Windmill Street, Millers Point was listed on the New South Wales State Heritage Register on 2 April 1999 having satisfied the following criteria.

The place is important in demonstrating the course, or pattern, of cultural or natural history in New South Wales.

Of historical significance as physical evidence of the development of the area with a diverse range of terrace style housing in the mid-late 19th century.

The place is important in demonstrating aesthetic characteristics and/or a high degree of creative or technical achievement in New South Wales.

Of environmental significance for its contribution to an architecturally diverse and historically important residential streetscape. Further research required.

The place has a strong or special association with a particular community or cultural group in New South Wales for social, cultural or spiritual reasons.

Further research required.

The place has potential to yield information that will contribute to an understanding of the cultural or natural history of New South Wales.

Further research required.

== See also ==
- Australian residential architectural styles
- 86-88 Windmill Street
