= Midway College School of Pharmacy =

Coordinates: 37°49′49.0″N 82°49′14.2″W

- Parent school: Midway College
- Established: 2011 (proposed)
- School type: Private
- Dean: Dr. Sarah Laws
- Location: Paintsville, Kentucky, USA
- Enrollment: 80 planned at opening
- Faculty: 100+ (estimated)
- Website: midway.edu/pharmacy

Midway College School of Pharmacy was a proposed private pharmacy school planned to open in Paintsville, Kentucky, United States. Announced to the public on January 11, 2010, the school planned to open on Big Sandy Community and Technical College's Mayo Campus in the fall of 2011.

After a second unsuccessful accreditation site visit by the Accreditation Council for Pharmacy Education (ACPE), Midway College dismissed the school's faculty and staff and sought to transfer the Paintsville property to the University of Charleston. The transfer was abandoned after the University of Charleston concluded during due diligence that projected enrollment was unrealistic.

== History ==
The college was to be housed on the Big Sandy campus until the permanent campus was complete. A self-contained campus, consisting of two 60,000 ft^{2} (5,600 m^{2}), buildings were completed. Dr. William B. Drake Jr., former president of Midway College, was expecting an enrollment of 320 when fully operational. It would have been the third pharmacy school in Kentucky (the other two being University of Kentucky College of Pharmacy and Sullivan University College of Pharmacy). The school was part of Midway College, a private liberal arts college located in Midway, Kentucky.

The school had been accredited by the Southern Association of Colleges and Schools (SACS) and was awaiting accreditation from the Accreditation Council for Pharmacy Education (ACPE) until the college withdrew their application for unknown reasons. If Midway College School of Pharmacy receives accreditation from ACPE, it will be a fully accredited college of pharmacy and will be able to offer the Doctor of Pharmacy degree.

It was projected that the school would generate more than $30 million in economic activity annually in Paintsville and Johnson County.

After failing the second site visit for accreditation from the Accreditation Council for Pharmacy Education (ACPE), rather than attempting to address issues noted by the ACPE and seeking a third (and final) site visit, the Board of Directors at Midway College terminated all faculty and staff and attempted to transfer the property to the University of Charleston, which already operated an accredited pharmacy school. The school in Paintsville would have operated as a branch location of the school of pharmacy based in Charleston, West Virginia had the transfer occurred. The transfer did not occur because during due diligence, they found that the projected number of students was not realistic.
