= Durham Hall, Surry Hills =

Durham Hall
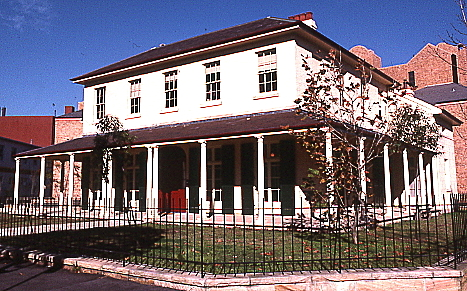
- Durham Hall, Surry Hills

- Location within inner Sydney
- 33°53′03″S 151°13′01″E
- Location: 207 Albion Street, Surry Hills, City of Sydney, New South Wales, Australia

History
- Built: 1834–1835
- Built for: George Hill

Site notes
- Architectural style: Colonial Georgian
- Owner: Royal College of Pathologists of Australasia

New South Wales Heritage Register
- Official name: Durham Hall; Concordia Club; Booker T. Washington Club; Royal College of Pathologists of Australasia
- Type: State heritage (built)
- Designated: 2 April 1999
- Reference no.: 221
- Type: House
- Category: Residential buildings (private)

Durham Hall is a heritage-listed former residence, Servicemens' Club, Concordia Club and Red Cross U.S.A and now commercial offices located at 207 Albion Street in the inner city Sydney suburb of Surry Hills in the City of Sydney local government area of New South Wales, Australia. It was built from 1834 to 1835. It has also been known as the Concordia Club and the Booker T. Washington Club. The property is currently owned and occupied by the Royal College of Pathologists of Australasia. It was added to the New South Wales State Heritage Register on 2 April 1999.

The Colonial Georgian brick residence was constructed for George Hill, a wealthy merchant. The house has had many owners and has had varied uses including a club. Over the years it was subjected to very unsympathetic alterations and additions. By the 1950s the building was almost unrecognisable. However, in 1983 major renovations were done to the house and many of the unsuitable additions were removed.

== History ==
=== Surry Hills ===
In 1792 Governor Phillip established the boundary of the Sydney Cove settlement when he drew a line from the heads of Cockle Bay to Woolloomooloo Bay. East of that line was set aside for the township and the west, which included the present-day Surry Hills, was considered suitable for farming and granted to military officers and free settlers.

The first land grants in the Surry Hills are situated on the south-eastern outskirts of the settlement, were made in the 1790s. In April 1794 Captain Joseph Foveaux received 105 acres, naming it "Surrey Hills Farm", in 1800 Palmer purchased Foveaux's grant. When Olmer's returned from England to give evidence about the Rum Rebellion, financial circumstances forced the sale of the land. The sale of Palmer's Estate in 1814 was the first subdivision in Surry Hills.

The few villas were built in the late 1820s; however the area was considered remote and much of the terrain "inhospitable". The suburb was one of contrasts with the white housing of wealthy merchants mixed with that of the commercial and working classes. Living conditions differed, varying from houses on the scale of Durham Hall to 1-2 room shacks.

Towards the end of the nineteenth and early twentieth century the population of the area increased, small factories moved into the suburb and as the nature of the area changed the living conditions of many of the residence deteriorated. Post World War II saw an influx of migrants to Surry Hills followed by their gradual displacement in the 1970s and 1980s by largely middle class population.

=== Durham Hall ===
Durham Hall is located on part of the land grant of 28 hectares (70 acres) to John Palmer on 1 April 1794. Isaac Nichols purchased part of Allotment 20 in August 1814. After subdivision in 1833 the land was bought by Thomas Broughton and subsequently by George Hill, in 1835 who built Durham Hall on this and adjoining lots. A description in 1899 states that the house was, ... built of brick on stone foundation, slate roof, verandah front and two sides containing hall, 8 rooms, dining room, pantry, kitchen, servant's room over, bathroom, and a detached laundry of brick, stabling being 3 stalls man's room and two coach houses - value A£2,300. "Garden yards and enclosures" were also reported to be part of the property. Between 1840 and 1850 Hill built a pair of cottages at 203-205 Albion Street, on the corner of Nichols Street, adjacent to Durham Hall.

==== George Hill and his family ====
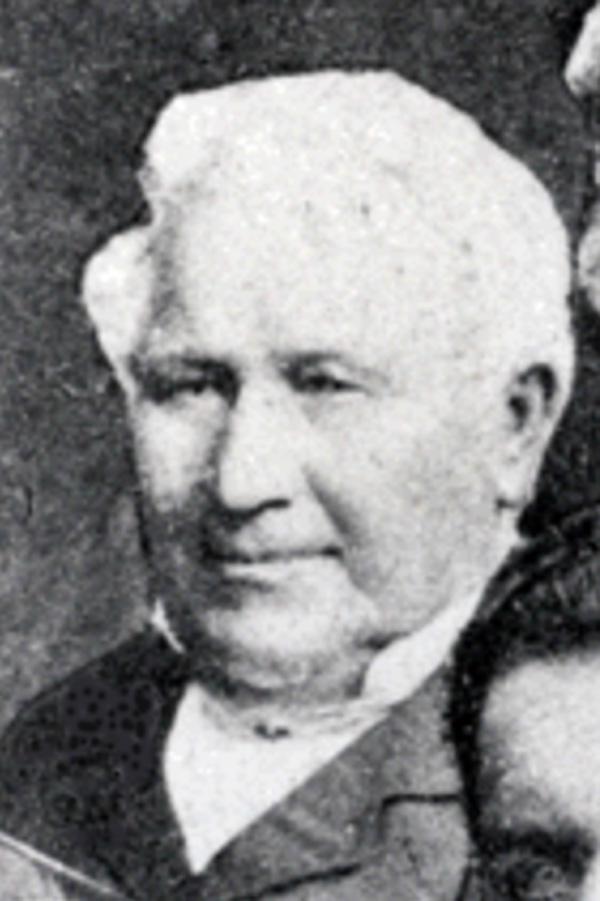
George Hill, c. 1870

George Hill was born in 1802 near Parramatta. He was the son of William Hill and Mary Johnson both of whom were convicts. His father obtained a pardon in 1813 and became a butcher. Hill also became a butcher and acquired considerable wealth by owning his own abattoir, purchasing several inns in Pitt Street and holding tracts of land.

In 1832 he married Mary Ann Hunter who was the recently widowed wife of Alexander Hunter, a warehouse owner in Pitt Street.

In 1835 Hill built Durham Hall on several lots of land that he had purchased. A few years after moving into Durham Hall his wife died aged 26 years.

On 24 March 1841 he married Jane Binnie, the daughter of Richard Binnie and Jane Studdart. Over the years the couple had a very large family. Three of their daughters married into notable families of that time. The eldest daughter Mary Jane married Fitzwilliam Wentworth, the son of William Charles Wentworth in 1868. The youngest daughter Helen Mary married Edward Pomeroy Rundle, the son of Jeremiah Rundle in 1897. Another daughter Alice Helen married Sir William Charles Cooper, the eldest son of Sir Daniel Cooper.

In 1842 Hill was elected to the Sydney Municipal Council and two years later became a magistrate. For a short time he was a Member of the New South Wales Legislative Council and returned to municipal politics and in 1850 was elected Mayor of Sydney.

Hill died in 1883 at age 81 after his buggy collided with a tram. His wife Jane lived at Durham Hall for another six years and in 1889 rented the home to women who used it as a boarding house. Jane Hill died on 25 January 1896.

==== Durham Hall as a boarding house ====
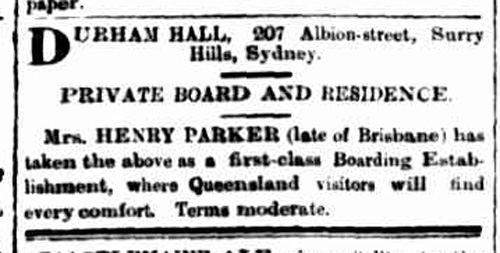
Advertisement for a boarding house at Durham Hall 1894

Durham Hall was used as a boarding house for ten years between 1889 and 1899. The first landlady was Mrs Cecilia Anderson who was there from 1889 until 1893. Shortly after she left Durham Hall there was a sensational court case which involved her and one of her boarders at Durham Hall.

The next landlady was Mrs Mary Parker. She was the widow of Henry Parker who had died in 1993 in Queensland. She advertised frequently in the Sydney Morning Herald for boarders and mentions that there was a tennis court. One of her early advertisements is on the right.

In 1899, three years after Mrs Jane Hill's death in 1896, Durham Hall was sold. It was bought by Charles Anderson.

==== Charles and Mary Jane Anderson ====
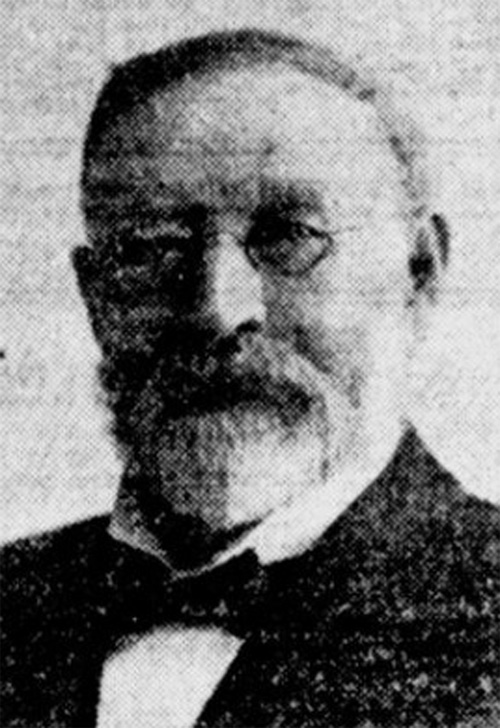
Charles Anderson, c. 1900

Charles Anderson was born in Scotland in 1838. He came to Australia in about 1880. He and his wife Mary Jane had five children.

He established a large hat factory called Anderson and Co in Surry Hills. It was a five-story building right behind Durham Hall in Nichols Street. It has since been demolished and replaced by residential units.

Charles Anderson was also a director of City Mutual Life Assurance Society Ltd and was said to be a philanthropist and generous to many charities.

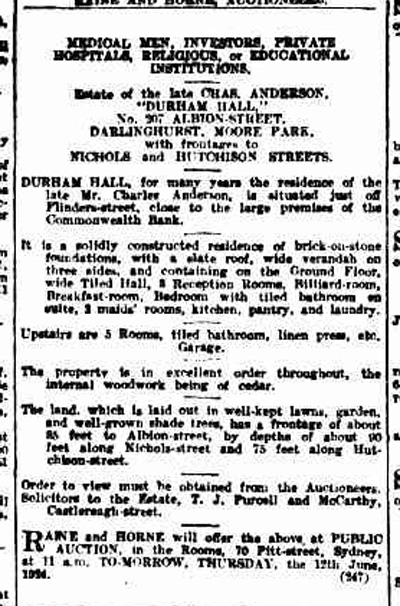
Advertisement for the sale of Durham Hall 1924

His wife Mary Jane died at Durham Hall in 1910. Charles continued to live at Durham Hall until his death in 1924. The property was then sold. The advertisement for the sale describing the house in 1924 is on the left.

==== German Concordia Club ====
In 1924 Durham Hall became the German Concordia Club and over the next decade extensive unsympathetic alterations and additions were made. Some of these included a bowling alley and gymnasium. A new façade on the street frontage was also constructed. The Concordia Club closed in 1939 with the outbreak of World War Two and for the next few years the Master Bakers Association used it as an educational and social club.

==== Booker T. Washington Service Club ====
In 1943 the American Red Cross took over the building and ran it as a nightclub for African American servicemen stationed in Australia. It was one of an international chain of clubs each named the Booker T. Washington Service Club. It was established to cater to black troops who suffered from segregation in other venues. Though designed for African Americans, it also served Australian Aborigines who experienced similar discrimination. The club was set up to respond to complaints from black servicepeople that they were facing Jim Crow "downunder".

At this time the US military was segregated, and Australia had the White Australia Policy. The white American troops instituted de facto segregation. There was an "unwritten law" that white American troops did not fraternise or drink with black American troops. As a result, African American troops were excluded from a number of social venues in Sydney. While reporting incidents and attitudes of racism from white compatriots, the African American troops also reported many instances where white Australians treated them with courtesy and respect. Concern about the morale of black troops led to the establishment of the nightclub. According to Australian historian Robert A Hall, the African American servicemen provided an example that the Aborigines wanted to emulate.

This club closed after World War Two.

==== The Commonwealth Bank ====
In 1949 The Commonwealth Bank acquired the premises and made further alterations. In 1979 the National Trust classified the property and in 1982 a Permanent Conservation Order was placed on it.

In 1983 major restoration of the building was made and unsympathetic additions were removed. Before this work was done the building was unrecognisable. A photo of it at this time was in the Sydney Morning Herald and a link to it on the internet is at this reference.

==== Royal College of Pathologists of Australasia ====
Today the building is utilised by the Royal College of Pathologists of Australasia.

== Description ==
=== Setting ===
Durham Hall gives a significant contribution to a rare colonial Georgian group of buildings in Sydney and exemplifies the gentleman's town residence. The house demonstrates the 1st phase of development subsequent to the subdivision of the early land grants and hence the development of European settlement (LEP).

A palisade fence surrounds the property, with capped stone pillars at the entry (built in the 1980s). A sympathetic recreated garden fronts the property to Albion Street and partly to its east on Nichols Street (1980s).

=== House ===
Durham Hall, 207 Albion Street is a two-storey, Colonial Georgian, stuccoed, brick residence with stone dressings, built c. 1835 by George Hill. The architect and builder are not known. It is an archetypal colonial Georgian two-storey brick house with stone dressings and ground floor verandahs (LEP). The house is symmetrically arranged. A ground floor verandah with skillion roof returns at each side abutting the rear wings of the building. The verandah features Doric columns. Double columns flank the entry. The hipped roof is slate (1980s) with boxed eaves.

The first floor windows are 12-paned, double hung, timber in Georgian style with shutters. French doors with shutters flank the centrally positioned entry. The verandah with the same detailing as that at the front, links the two wings at the rear of the house. It opens onto stone flagged courtyard. A palisade fence surrounds the property, with capped stone pillars at the entry (also 1980s).

The basic structure of the building is original, however many of the architectural components, such as the roofing, joinery and verandah are evidence of the extensive 1980s "restoration" work.

=== Condition ===
'A badly mutilated, once fine, Georgian house...'.

Inside the house few original fittings remain although some cedar windows are still there, and part of the black and white marble-tield floor in the entrance hall has been uncovered. There are still extensive stone cellars. The detached kitchen block and stables no longer exist.

Durham Hall does not lie within an identified archaeological zone. The site of Durham Hall has been significantly disturbed. Due to extensive alterations to the site it is unlikely that it would provide useful evidence of occupation, however old infrastructures such as drains and cisterns might have survived.

=== Modifications and dates ===
- 1925–1933 Concordia Club made extensive additions and alterations that included an annexure with a banquet hall, gymnasium and bowling alley (1925–1926) and new facade (1933), all on the street alignment.
- 1949 Commonwealth Bank converted parts of the premises for their use. An area above a garage was leased to the Department of Labour and National Service.
- 1959 Further demolition and alterations
- 1983 extensive alterations and reconstruction including removal of previous additions and replacement of much surviving 1835 fabric. A 75-unit development was proposed for construction on the southern and western portions of the site. The restorations of Durham Hall, a change in zoning of the land and alterations to the design of adjacent unit development were influenced by consultations with the Heritage Council. The subsequent design was of lower scale and more sensitive to that of Durham Hall. Site inspections at the time revealed that prior to restoration some of its joinery was still intact, however other parts of the house had not survived, or had been dismantled or damaged.
- 1987 garden reconstruction.

== Heritage listing ==
As at 6 February 2017, Durham Hall at 207 Albion Street, Surry Hills is able to demonstrate the early development of Surry Hills. It retains its original Colonial Georgian 2-storey form and planning, and with 203–205 Albion Street contributes to the historic streetscape of Albion Street. It belongs to an import and rare group of surviving Colonial Georgian style, substantial, 2- storey, middle-class houses of symmetrical layout in Surry Hills and other parts of inner Sydney.

Durham Hall demonstrates the first stage of the development of Surry Hills and the subdivision of early land grants in 1814. With Cleveland House, Surry Hills, it is one of few surviving examples of Colonial Georgian residential development of this scale and type in the locality.

Durham Hall has historical significance as the early nineteenth century residence of a colonial-born Sydney gentleman, and demonstrates the social status of Surry Hills at the time. It is historically linked, through its shared original ownership and proximity, to more modest Colonial Georgian dwellings at 203–205 and 197–201 Albion Street, Surry Hills.

Durham Hall has strong historical association with George Hill (1802–1883), a significant figure in early nineteenth century Sydney history, who was responsible for the building of the house in c. 1835 as his family home, and who resided there with his family until his death in 1883. Hill's widow also resided in the house for some years after George Hill's death, so the house remained in Hill family ownership for over 50 years in the 19th century.

According to the Australian Dictionary of Biography, George Hill was an alderman, magistrate and sporting patron. Born in Parramatta, the son of a convict, he amassed his fortune through work as a butcher and innkeeper, accumulating real estate in Surry Hills and the Murrumbidgee district. Hill was elected to the first Sydney Municipal Council in 1842 as part of an Australian-born faction, and by 1850 was Mayor of Sydney. During this period he became a magistrate. He was said to have brought "dignity and respect" to the office and was praised for reforming abuses in the police courts.

In 1856 Hill was elected to the first NSW Legislative Council, resigning in May 1861. Hill sat on the Committee of the Benevolent Asylum. Hill and his family are closely associated with prominent Sydney families of the period such as the Wentworths and Coopers.

The Concordia Club Ltd. has a strong historical association with Durham Hall in the early twentieth-century through its ownership and use of the building as its club premises from 1923 to 1939, providing recreational facilities for the Sydney German community at that time.

Durham Hall also has historical association with the American Red Cross and the provision of accommodation and recreational facilities for American servicemen of African descent during World War II, in the years between 1943 and 1945. Durham Hall Is of aesthetic significance as a fine, rare representative example of a Colonial Georgian style gentleman's residence. With similarities to Willandra at Ryde and Cleveland House in Surry Hills, Durham Hall demonstrates the symmetry of Colonial Georgian style planning and form. Durham Hall is the principal building in an important Colonial Georgian style group encompassing the cottages at 203–205 Albion Street and terraces at 197–201 Albion Street, all originally built for George Hill, and evidencing the scale and nature of the colonial streetscape of Albion Street.

Durham Hall was listed on the New South Wales State Heritage Register on 2 April 1999 having satisfied the following criteria.

The place is important in demonstrating the course, or pattern, of cultural or natural history in New South Wales.

Durhman hall demonstrates the first stage of the development of Surry Hills and subdivision of land Grants in 1814. With Cleveland House, it is one of few surviving examples of Colonial Georgian residential development of this scale and type in the locality. It is linked, through its ownership by George Hill and proximity, to more modest colonial Georgian dwellings in close proximity at 203—205 Albion Street, Surry Hills.

The place has a strong or special association with a person, or group of persons, of importance of cultural or natural history of New South Wales's history.

Durham Hall is associated with George Hill (1802–1883). The Australian Dictionary of Biography 1851–1890 states that he was an alderman, magistrate and sporting patron. Born in Parramatta, son of a convict, he amassed his fortune through work as a butcher and innkeeper, accumulating real estate in Surry Hills and the Murrumbidgee district. Hill was elected to be the first Sydney Municipal Council in 1842 as part of an Australian-born faction, and by 1850 was Mayor. During this period he became a magistrate. He was said to have...brought "dignity and respect" to the office and was praised for reforming abuses in the police courts.

In 1856 Hill was elected to the first Legislative Council, resigning in May 1861. he sat on the Committee of the Benevolent Asylum. Hill and his family are closely associated with prominent families of the period such as the Wentworth and Coopers.

The Concordia Club Ltd. Has a strong association with Durham Hall in the twentieth-century through its ownership and use of the building as its club premises from 1923 to 1939. The building provided recreational facilities and a venue of social events for the Sydney German community. A published history, detailing its period at Durham Hall is evidence of the building's importance to the club, the history of which dates back to the late nineteenth century.

Between 1943 and 1945 Durham hall is significant for its association with the American Red Cross and the provision of accommodation and recreational facilities for American servicemen of African descent during World War II. It demonstrates the support role that the Australian community played by providing a base for the American forces.

The place is important in demonstrating aesthetic characteristics and/or a high degree of creative or technical achievement in New South Wales.

Durham Hall is a good example of Colonial Georgian architecture despite the extensive 1980's reconstruction. Like Willandra at Ryde and Cleveland House in Surry Hills, it demonstrates the symmetry of Colonial Georgian style planning and form. With the cottages at 203-205 Albion Street it demonstrates Colonial Georgian architecture, influenced by the differing socio-economic status of the others. The building is evidence of the scale and nature of the colonial streetscape and makes a substantial contribution to the current streetscape.

The place has potential to yield information that will contribute to an understanding of the cultural or natural history of New South Wales.

Durham Hall does not lie within an identified archaeological zone and is not formally recognised as being of archaeological potential. The site of Durham hall has been significantly disturbed. Due to the extensive alterations to the site it is unlikely that the site would provide useful evidence of occupation, however old infrastructures such as drains and cisterns might have survived. As a result of extensive reconstruction Durham Hall has minimal research potential for understanding nineteenth-century building technology.

The place possesses uncommon, rare or endangered aspects of the cultural or natural history of New South Wales.

Durham Hall is representative of Colonial Georgian style architecture, symmetry and planning. It is rare in Surry Hills and is part of a surviving group of Colonial Georgian style, substantial two-storey, middle-class houses, that include Cleveland House and Willandra at Ryde.

== See also ==
- Australian residential architectural styles
- 203-205 Albion Street, Surry Hills cottages
