= Royal College of Pathologists of Australasia =

Sydney-based medical organization (1956–)

The Royal College of Pathologists of Australasia

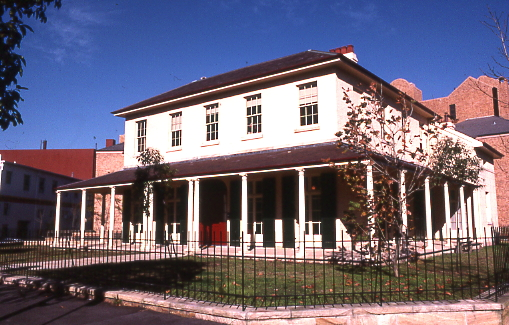
- Heritage-listed Durham Hall, Surry Hills, offices for the college since 1986
- Abbreviation: RCPA
- Predecessor: The Royal College of Pathologists of Australia
- Formation: 1956
- Purpose: Pathology
- Headquarters: Sydney, Australia
- Location: Australia
- Region served: Australia & New Zealand
- Official language: English
- President: Lawrie Bott
- Website: www.rcpa.edu.au

The Royal College of Pathologists of Australasia (RCPA) is a medical organization that promotes the science and practice of pathology. The RCPA is a leading organisation representing pathologists and other senior scientists in Australasia.

== History ==
The College of Pathologists of Australia was incorporated on 10 April 1956. In 1970, the college was granted royal assent, and became the Royal College of Pathologists of Australia. With the increasing number of Fellows in New Zealand, the college changed its name to the Royal College of Pathologists of Australasia in January 1980. Since 1986, the college has occupied Durham Hall, a heritage listed building in Surry Hills, Sydney and the adjacent 203-205 Albion Street cottages.

== Programmes ==
=== Training and examinations ===
The college conducts training and examinations in several sub-disciplines, including:

- Anatomical Pathology
- Chemical Pathology
- Forensic Pathology
- General Pathology
- Genetics
- Haematology
- Immunopathology
- Microbiology

The college accredits laboratories for training, approves supervised training in accredited laboratories, and conducts examinations leading to Fellowship of the college (FRCPA).

=== Continuing Professional Development ===
Since its inception, the college has contributed to the continual development of knowledge and skills of its Fellows, and has established a formal Continuing Professional Development Program.

== Professional Practice Standards ==
The college collaborated with the Commonwealth Government to establish the National Pathology Accreditation Advisory Council (NPAAC) in 1979. NPAAC advises the Commonwealth, State and Territory Health Ministers on matters relating to the accreditation of pathology laboratories, plays a key role in ensuring the quality of Australian pathology services and is responsible for the development and maintenance of standards and guidelines for pathology practices.

While NPAAC provides the standards for laboratory practice, the actual accreditation process is carried out by NATA/RCPA, a joint initiative between the college and the National Association of Testing Authorities (NATA).

== Pathology Update ==
Pathology Update is the annual scientific conference hosted by the Royal College of Pathologists of Australasia. The multi-disciplinary event covers emerging research, technological advancements, and diagnostic challenges across all major pathology disciplines. The program features plenary sessions, specialized workshops, and abstract presentations by regional and international experts. Traditionally held in major Australasian cities such as Sydney and Melbourne, the meeting also serves as the primary venue for RCPA college awards, including the Roche E-Poster Prize and various trainee prizes.
