= Chinese Presbyterian Church =

- CPC
- 华人长老会教堂
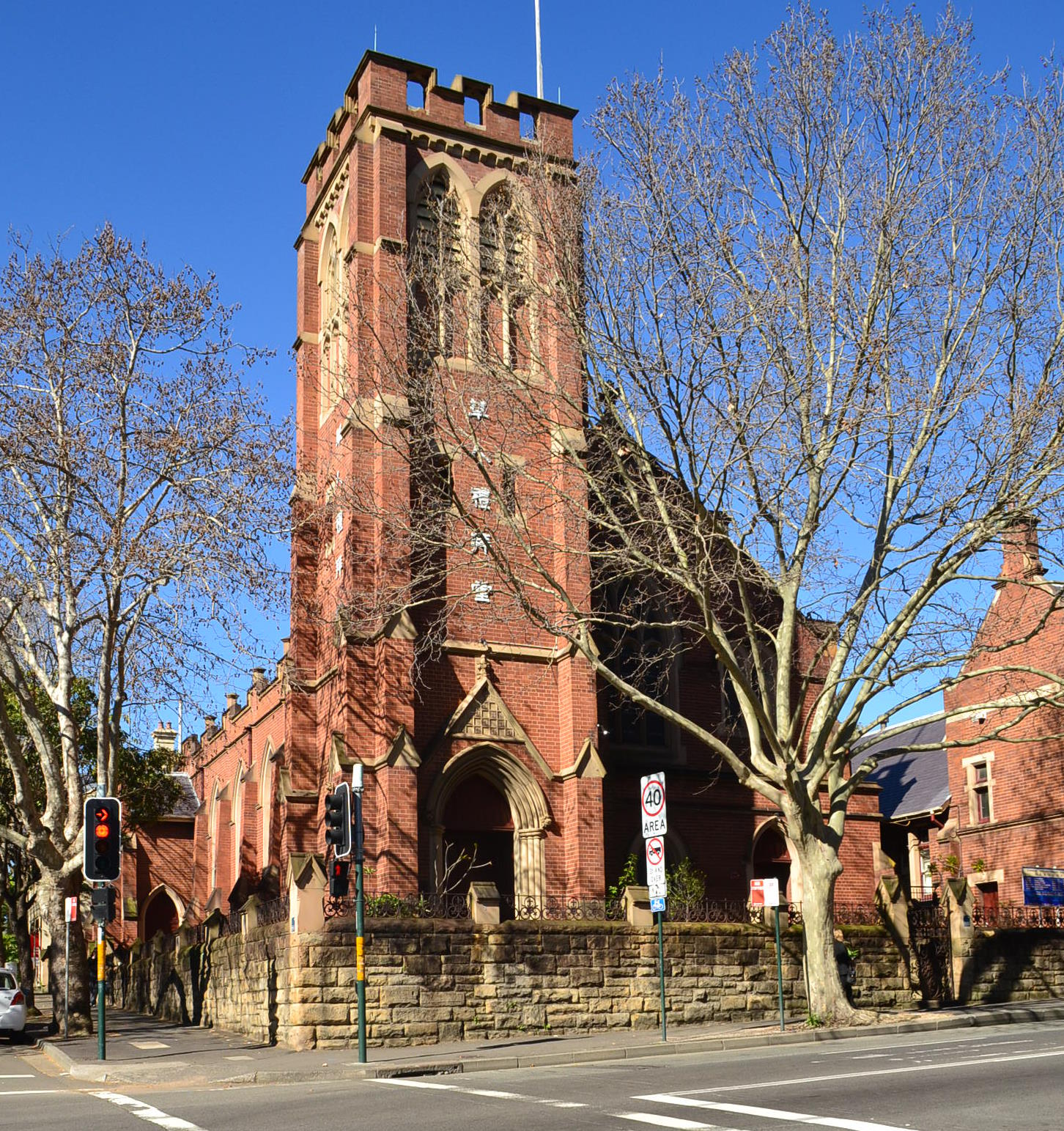
- Chinese Presbyterian Church, Surry Hills
- Chinese Presbyterian Church
- 33°53′01″S 151°12′52″E
- Location: Corner of Crown and Albion Streets, Surry Hills, New South Wales
- Country: Australia
- Denomination: Presbyterian
- Website: www.cpc.org.au

History
- Former name: Fullerton Memorial Church
- Status: Church
- Founded: 20 July 1904
- Founder: Sir Harry Rawson
- Dedication: Rev. Dr James Fullerton
- Dedicated: 6 July 1905

Architecture
- Functional status: Active
- Architect: Joseph Alexander Kethel
- Architectural type: Church
- Style: Gothic Revival

Specifications
- Materials: Brick

Administration
- Division: New South Wales
- Parish: Surry Hills

The Chinese Presbyterian Church, also commonly known as CPC, is a Presbyterian church at the corner of Crown and Albion Streets, Surry Hills, in Sydney, New South Wales, Australia. The church is reputedly the oldest surviving Chinese church in Australia. As at 2017, the church had a congregation of approximately six hundred people meeting in worship services catering to languages of English, Cantonese, and Mandarin, and primarily seeks to reach out to the Chinese community of Sydney.

== History ==
The first Chinese churches arose out of the gold rush of the 1860s in Victoria, during which numbers of migrants travelled to Australia to make their fortune. The Chinese Presbyterian Church can trace its foundation to the Presbyterian Chinese Mission formed by the Presbyterian Church of New South Wales as Sydney became an increasingly important centre for Chinese immigrants.

The Chinese Presbyterian Church officially began in 1893, opening its first church building on Foster Street in Surry Hills. Its first clergyman was John Young Wai. The congregation moved to Campbell Street in 1910, then moved to its current location at the Fullerton Memorial Church in 1957, located at the corner of Crown and Albion Streets. The Fullerton Memorial Church building, completed in the Gothic Revival style, was dedicated in 1905 in honour of Rev. Dr James Fullerton, a controversial Presbyterian minister in Sydney during the middle decades of the 19th century.

Today the church continues to worship at the Fullerton Memorial Church building and owns and uses various adjoining properties for ministry. The current minister, since 2016, is Rev. Christopher Chan who succeeded Rev. David Tsai.

== Relationships with other Chinese churches ==
In 1964 four elders left CPC to form a new church at Milsons Point known as Chinese Christian Church, or CCC. It began as an 'inter-denominational' church based on Congregationalist church government principles and is strongly evangelical in nature. It has an active church planting culture that has led to a lot of Chinese church plants in Sydney, including West Sydney Chinese Christian Church (WSCCC, or ‘WS’), which has also planted many Chinese churches around Sydney.

Cornerstone Presbyterian Community Church was planted in Concord out of Chinese Presbyterian Church in 1994 with a group of 30 adults. By 1997, Cornerstone was constituted as a pastoral charge separate from the Chinese Presbyterian Church. The Cornerstone church operates as a single church under a multi-site model, currently numbering at eight Sydney locations, with plans to expand further.

GracePoint Chinese Presbyterian Church began as a church planted in Burwood by CPC in 1998. The church partnered with the St James Presbyterian Church at first, becoming independent only in its second year, and was originally named Burwood Chinese Presbyterian Church. As the church outgrew its location, it sought out another place for a church building. In 2010, the new church building at Lidcombe was successfully built and was also renamed as GracePoint Chinese Presbyterian Church.

=== Challenges for the future ===
CPC faces challenges in considering and redefining its place as a Sydney Chinese church as at 2011 due to a slow but inevitable trend over the last several years for church members with growing young families to seek local Chinese churches as closer and more viable alternatives for Christian community. In addition, the presence of increasing numbers of local Chinese churches, of which some are not related to CPC in origin, mean that the Chinese Christian community is becoming more locally defined and decentralised from what was once a few large Chinese church communities. Increase in local outreach focus in the Surry Hills area is one such solution, including a focus on international expatriates and young working professionals working and living in the Surry Hills area.
