= John Young Wai =

Chinese Australian community leader and Presbyterian minister

John Young Wai (1847 – 21 June 1930) was an Australian Chinese community leader, Presbyterian lay leader and Presbyterian minister.

John Young Wai was born 1930 in Canton, Guangdong, China.

He moved to Victoria, Australia in 1867 to try his luck in the Victorian Goldfields, but without success so gave it up after three years and devoted the rest of his life to the Presbyterian Church, first in Victoria as a lay leader (1877-1882), and then in Sydney, New South Wales, becoming a minister in 1893. He established the Chinese Presbyterian Church in Sydney as well as a second church.

He died in Summer Hill, Sydney, New South Wales, on 21 June 1930 and was buried in Rookwood Cemetery on 23 June 1930.

He was the grandfather of eminent paediatrician John Yu.
