= George Hill (Australian politician) =

Australian politician

George Hill (25 March 1802 – 19 July 1883) was an Australian politician.

He was born at Parramatta to convicts William Hill and Mary Johnston. He became a butcher, as did his father, and eventually held significant real estate, as well as land on the Murrumbidgee River. He served on Sydney City Council from 1842 to 1851 and from 1857 to 1858, and was mayor in 1850. He was also a member of the New South Wales Legislative Council from 1848 to 1849 and from 1856 to 1861. He was twice married: first to Mary Ann Hunter, and then to Jane Binnie, with whom he had ten children. Hill died at Surry Hills in 1883. He built Durham Hall, Albion Street, Surry Hills in about 1835, and lived there until his death.

Civic offices
Preceded by Edward Flood	Mayor of Sydney; 1850	Succeeded by William Thurlow

== See also ==
Political families of Australia - Wentworth/Hill/Griffiths/Scott/Cooper family
