= Cleveland House =

Historic house in Kentucky, United States

- U.S. National Register of Historic Places
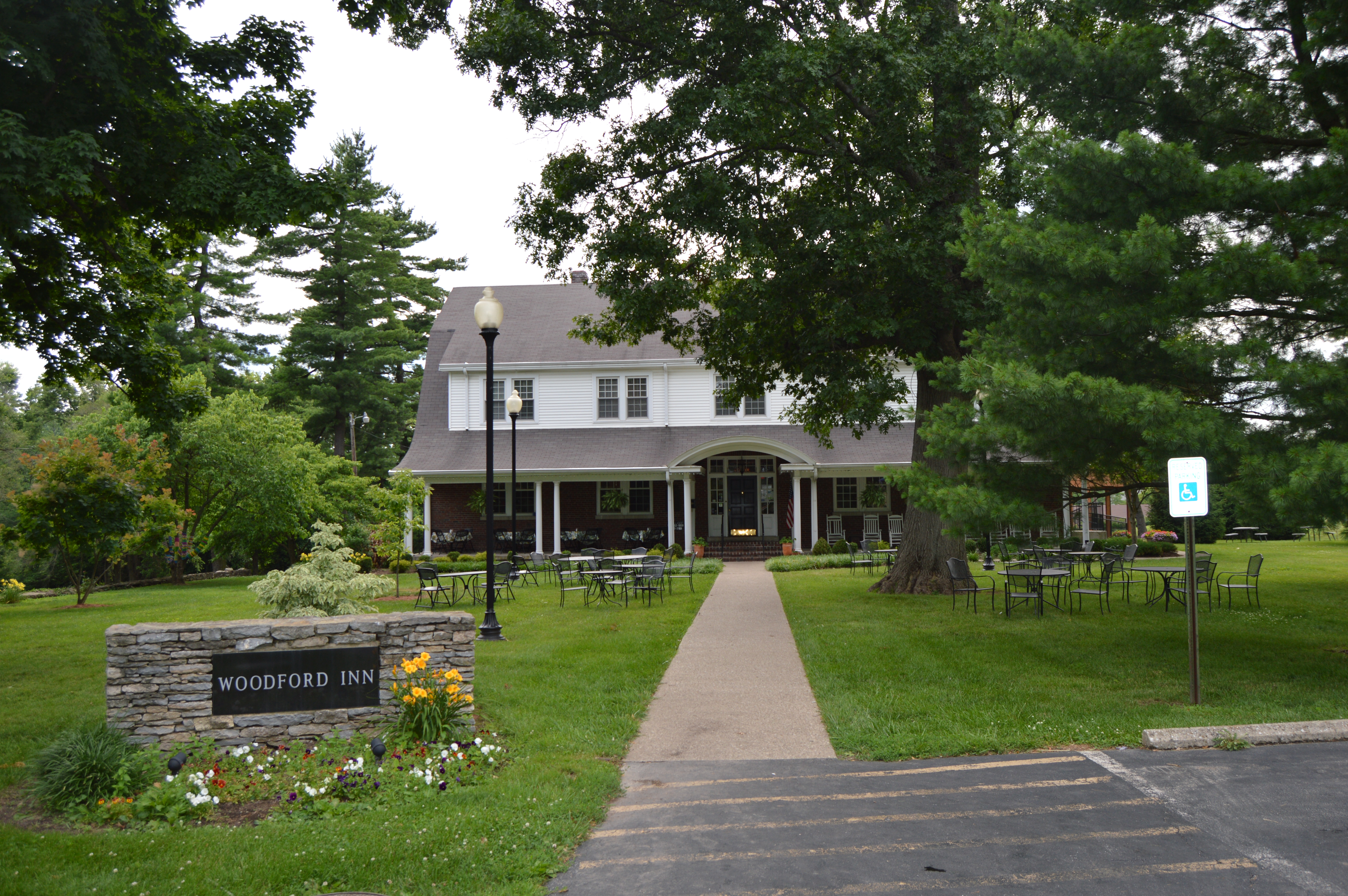
- Front of the house

- Location within Kentucky Location within the United States
- Location: 140 Park Street, Versailles, Kentucky
- Coordinates: 38°3′9″N 84°43′55″W
- Area: 2.3 acres (0.93 ha)
- Built: 1926
- Architect: W.B. Tillett; Bass and Hagan
- Architectural style: Colonial Revival
- NRHP reference No.: 07000287
- Added to NRHP: April 10, 2007

The Cleveland House is located in Versailles, Kentucky. Originally the Cleveland Orphan Home, it was an orphanage that incorporated in 1869, remaining in operation until the 1950s. The original 1875 house was made of brick in classic revival style architecture. The current structure was built in 1926, a 2½-story Dutch Colonial Revival building on the main foundation of the earlier house.

The current building is home of The Woodford Inn, a 10-room bed and breakfast inn. Prior to becoming The Woodford Inn, it was The Cleveland Home, a residential facility for girls through age 17, until its closure in 2005.

It was added to the National Register of Historic Places in 2007.
