= List of colleges and universities in South Carolina =

There are 56 colleges and universities in the U.S. state of South Carolina. The University of South Carolina in Columbia is the largest university in the state, by enrollment. Trident Technical College in North Charleston is the largest two-year college. The oldest institution is the College of Charleston, founded in 1770 and chartered in 1785.

The majority of colleges and universities in South Carolina are accredited by the Southern Association of Colleges and Schools (SACS). There are eight historically black colleges and universities.

The Medical University of South Carolina in Charleston, the University of South Carolina School of Medicine in Columbia and the University of South Carolina School of Medicine in Greenville are the only medical schools in the state accredited by the Liaison Committee on Medical Education (LCME).

Charleston School of Law and the University of South Carolina School of Law are American Bar Association (ABA) approved law schools.

== Institutions ==
=== Four-year ===
List of four-year colleges and universities in South Carolina
School	Location(s)	Control	Type (Note: School types are based on the Carnegie Classification of Institutions of Higher Education.)	Enrollment (Fall 2024)	Founded	Accreditation
Allen University (Note: Historically black college or university)	Columbia	Private (A.M.E Church)	Special Focus: Arts and Sciences	610	1870	SACS
Anderson University	Anderson	Private (Baptist)	Undergraduate/Graduate-Doctorate	4,710	1911	SACS
Benedict College (Note: Historically black college or university)	Columbia	Private (Baptist)	Baccalaureate	1,691	1870	SACS
Bob Jones University	Greenville	Private (Nondenominational Christian)	Baccalaureate	2,734	1927	TRACS, SACS
Charleston School of Law	Charleston	Private	Special Focus: Law	692	2003	ABA
Charleston Southern University	North Charleston	Private (Baptist)	Undergraduate/Graduate-Doctorate	3,832	1964	SACS
The Citadel, The Military College of South Carolina	Charleston	Public	Undergraduate/Graduate-Master's	3,793	1842	SACS
Claflin University	Orangeburg	Private (Methodist)	Special Focus: Arts and Sciences	1,852	1869	SACS
Clemson University	Clemson	Public	Undergraduate/Graduate-Doctorate (R1)	29,077	1889	SACS
Clinton College	Rock Hill	Private (AME Zion)	Special Focus: Business	126	1894	TRACS
Coastal Carolina University	Conway	Public	Undergraduate/Graduate-Master's (Research)	11,348	1954	SACS
Coker University	Hartsville	Private	Baccalaureate	1,325	1908	SACS
College of Charleston	Charleston	Public	Undergraduate/Graduate-Master's (Research)	11,926	1770	SACS
Columbia College	Columbia	Private (Methodist)	Undergraduate/Graduate-Master's	1,725	1854	SACS
Columbia International University	Columbia	Private (Interdenominational)	Undergraduate/Graduate-Doctorate	2,914	1923	SACS
Converse University	Spartanburg	Private	Undergraduate/Graduate-Doctorate	1,787	1890	SACS
Erskine College	Due West	Private (Presbyterian)	Baccalaureate	912	1839	SACS
Francis Marion University	Florence	Public	Baccalaureate	4,112	1970	SACS
Furman University	Greenville	Private	Special Focus: Arts and Sciences	2,554	1826	SACS
Lander University	Greenwood	Public	Baccalaureate	4,378	1872	SACS
Medical University of South Carolina	Charleston	Public	Special Focus: Medical Schools and Centers (R1)	3,246	1824	SACS
Morris College	Sumter	Private (Baptist)	Baccalaureate	383	1908	SACS
Newberry College	Newberry	Private (Lutheran)	Baccalaureate	1,536	1856	SACS
North Greenville University	Tigerville	Private (Baptist)	Baccalaureate	2,304	1891	SACS
Presbyterian College	Clinton	Private (Presbyterian)	Undergraduate/Graduate-Doctorate	1,095	1880	SACS
Sherman College of Chiropractic	Spartanburg	Private	Special Focus: Other Health Professions	387	1973	CCE
South Carolina State University	Orangeburg	Public	Baccalaureate (R2)	3,242	1896	SACS
Southern Wesleyan University	Central	Private (Wesleyan)	Baccalaureate	980	1906	SACS
Spartanburg Methodist College	Spartanburg	Private (Methodist)	Associate/Baccalaureate	1,119	1911	SACS
University of South Carolina Aiken	Aiken	Public	Undergraduate/Graduate-Master's	4,022	1961	SACS
University of South Carolina Beaufort	Beaufort	Public	Baccalaureate	2,208	1959	SACS
University of South Carolina Columbia (Main campus)	Columbia	Public	Undergraduate/Graduate-Doctorate (R1)	38,532	1801	SACS
University of South Carolina Upstate	Spartanburg	Public	Baccalaureate	4,916	1967	SACS
Voorhees University	Denmark	Private (Episcopal)	Baccalaureate	578	1897	SACS
Winthrop University	Rock Hill	Public	Undergraduate/Graduate-Master's (Research)	4,894	1886	SACS
Wofford College	Spartanburg	Private (Methodist)	Special Focus: Arts and Sciences	1,817	1854	SACS

=== Two-year ===
List of two-year colleges and universities in South Carolina
School	Location(s)	Control	Type (Note: School types are based on the Carnegie Classification of Institutions of Higher Education.)	Enrollment (Fall 2024)	Founded	Accreditation
Aiken Technical College	Aiken	Public	Associate's college	2,307	1972	SACS
Central Carolina Technical College	Sumter (Note: Central Carolina Tech has locations in Sumter, Bishopville, Camden, and Manning.)	Public	Associate's college	2,825	1962	SACS
Denmark Technical College	Denmark	Public	Associate's college	675	1947	SACS
Florence–Darlington Technical College	Florence	Public	Associate's college	3,522	1963	SACS
Greenville Technical College	Greenville (Note: Greenville Tech has locations in Greenville, Berea, Greer, and Simpsonville.)	Public	Associate's college	11,999	1962	SACS
Horry-Georgetown Technical College	Conway (Note: Horry-Georgetown Tech has locations in Conway, Georgetown, and Myrtle Beach.)	Public	Associate's college	7,923	1966	SACS
Midlands Technical College	West Columbia (Note: Midlands Tech has locations in West Columbia, Batesburg-Leesville, Columbia, Fort Jackson, and Irmo.)	Public	Associate's college	9,226	1973 (Note: Created in 1974 as a merger of three institutions founded in 1947, 1957, and 1963)	SACS
Northeastern Technical College	Cheraw (Note: Northeastern Tech has locations in Cheraw, Bennettsville, Dillon, and Pageland.)	Public	Associate's college	1,428	1968	SACS
Orangeburg–Calhoun Technical College	Orangeburg	Public	Associate's college	2,106	1968	SACS
Piedmont Technical College	Greenwood (Note: Piedmont Tech has locations in Greenwood, Abbeville, Clinton, Edgefield, McCormick, Newberry, and Saluda.)	Public	Associate's college	5,143	1966	SACS
Spartanburg Community College	Spartanburg (Note: Spartanburg CC has locations in Spartanburg, Duncan, and Gaffney.)	Public	Associate's college	6,653	1963	SACS
Technical College of the Lowcountry	Beaufort (Note: TCL has locations in Beaufort, Bluffton, Hampton, Parris Island, and Walterboro.)	Public	Associate's college	2,461	1868	SACS
Tri-County Technical College	Pendleton (Note: Tri-County Tech has locations in Pendleton, Anderson, Easley, and Seneca.)	Public	Associate's college	5,890	1962	SACS
Trident Technical College	North Charleston (Note: Trident Tech has locations in North Charleston, Charleston, and Moncks Corner.)	Public	Associate's college	13,552	1964	SACS
University of South Carolina Lancaster	Lancaster	Public	Associate's college	2,687	1959	SACS
University of South Carolina Salkehatchie	Allendale	Public	Associate's college	799	1965	SACS
University of South Carolina Sumter	Sumter	Public	Associate's college	1,845	1966	SACS
University of South Carolina Union	Union (Note: USC Union has locations in Union and Laurens.)	Public	Associate's college	1,402	1965	SACS
Williamsburg Technical College	Kingstree	Public	Associate's college	668	1969	SACS
York Technical College	Rock Hill	Public	Associate's college	4,771	1964	SACS

== Defunct colleges ==
- The Arsenal, Columbia, sister school of The Citadel. The only surviving building is now the South Carolina Governor's Mansion. (1842 to 1865, destroyed during the Civil War)
- Chicora College, Columbia (1893 to 1930, merged with Queens College)
- Due West Female College, Due West (1859 to 1927, merged with Erskine College)
- Friendship College, Rock Hill (1891 to 1981, closed)
- Limestone University, Gaffney (1845 to 2025, closed)
- South Carolina Female Collegiate Institute, Columbia (1828 to 1867, closed)

== Out-of-state non-profit institutions ==
- Edward Via College of Osteopathic Medicine has a campus in Spartanburg

== Out-of-state for-profit institutions ==
Schools based in other states offer programs at locations in South Carolina:

- ECPI University has campuses in Charleston, Columbia, and Greenville
- South University has a campus in Columbia
- Strayer University has campuses in Charleston and Greenville

== See also ==
- Higher education in the United States
- List of college athletic programs in South Carolina
- List of American institutions of higher education
- List of recognized higher education accreditation organizations
- List of colleges and universities
- List of colleges and universities by country
