= HGTC =

HGTC may refer to:

- Horry-Georgetown Technical College in Conway, South Carolina, a part of the South Carolina Technical College System
- Heart of Georgia Technical College in Dublin, Georgia, a part of the Technical College System of Georgia
- Hougang Town Council in Singapore
- A package included with the 2006 Ferrari 612 Scaglietti and later models
