= Myrtle Beach State Park =

Coastal park in South Carolina

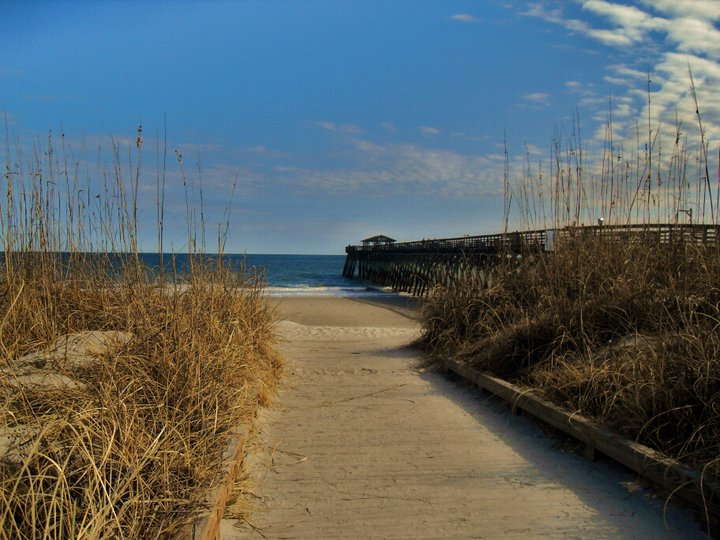
- The ocean and boardwalk at Myrtle Beach State Park

- Location within the United States
- Location: Horry County, South Carolina, USA
- Nearest city: Myrtle Beach, South Carolina
- Coordinates: 33°38′52″N 78°55′39″W
- Area: 312 acres (126 ha)
- Established: 1935
- Governing body: South Carolina Department of Parks, Recreation and Tourism

Myrtle Beach State Park is a 312 acre state park located in Myrtle Beach, South Carolina, on land donated by Myrtle Beach Farms in 1934.

== History ==
Myrtle Beach State Park was established on land donated by Myrtle Beach Farms in 1934. The park was South Carolina´s first State Park, opening in 1936. It was developed by the Civilian Conservation Corps, a New Deal Program created by President Franklin D. Roosevelt during the Great Depression. A number of buildings built by the CCC in the 1930s are still in use there.

== Geography ==
The park is located in Myrtle Beach, South Carolina and immediately Southwest of the former Myrtle Beach Air Force Base.

It includes one mile of undeveloped beach in Horry County. The park's maritime forest has been declared a Heritage Trust Site. The maritime forest includes live oaks and southern magnolias. Other unique features include sea oats located on the dunes and an expansive sand dunes system along the beach. The Myrtle Beach State Park Nature Center features interactive natural history displays, saltwater aquariums and live animals.The park also two nature trails: the Yaupon Nature Trail and the Sculptured Oak Nature Trail.

Myrtle Beach State park is open from 6 am to 8 pm with extended hours from March to November. A fee is charged for admission to the park. South Carolina Department of Parks, Recreation and Tourism offers annual Passports that can significantly decrease admission fees based upon usage.Programs about coastal habitat and native wildlife are offered throughout the year.

== Activities ==
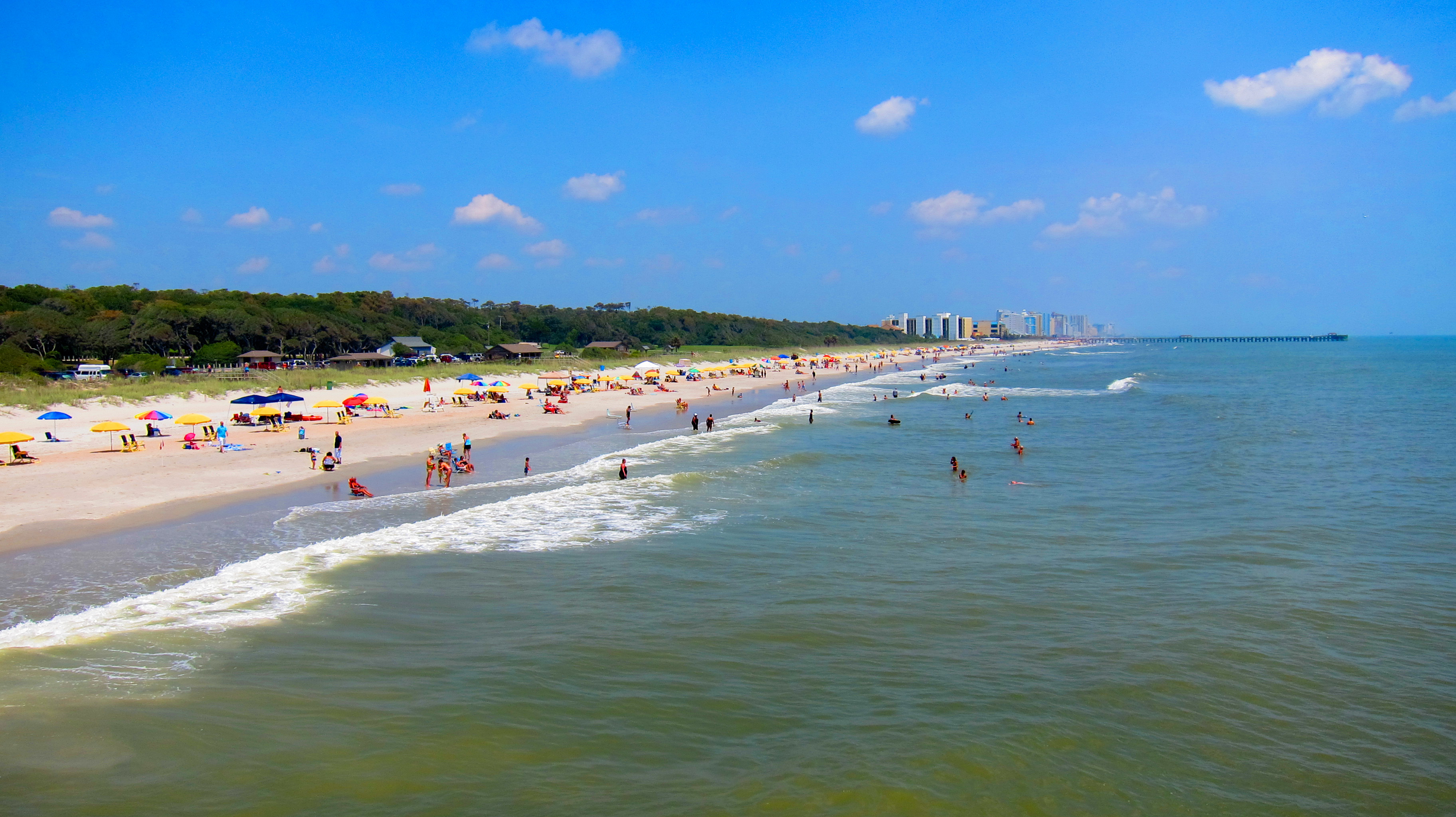
The beach, populated with people

At the beach, Horry County lifeguards are stationed on the north section of Myrtle Beach State Park from mid-May through mid-September. Umbrellas and beach chairs are available to rent from the lifeguards. The beach at Myrtle Beach State Park falls within the jurisdiction of Horry County, and therefore abides by Horry County Ordinances and Regulations. Horry County also has ordinances that prohibit pets and bicycles on public beaches from May 1 through Labor Day between the hours of 10 am and 5 pm.

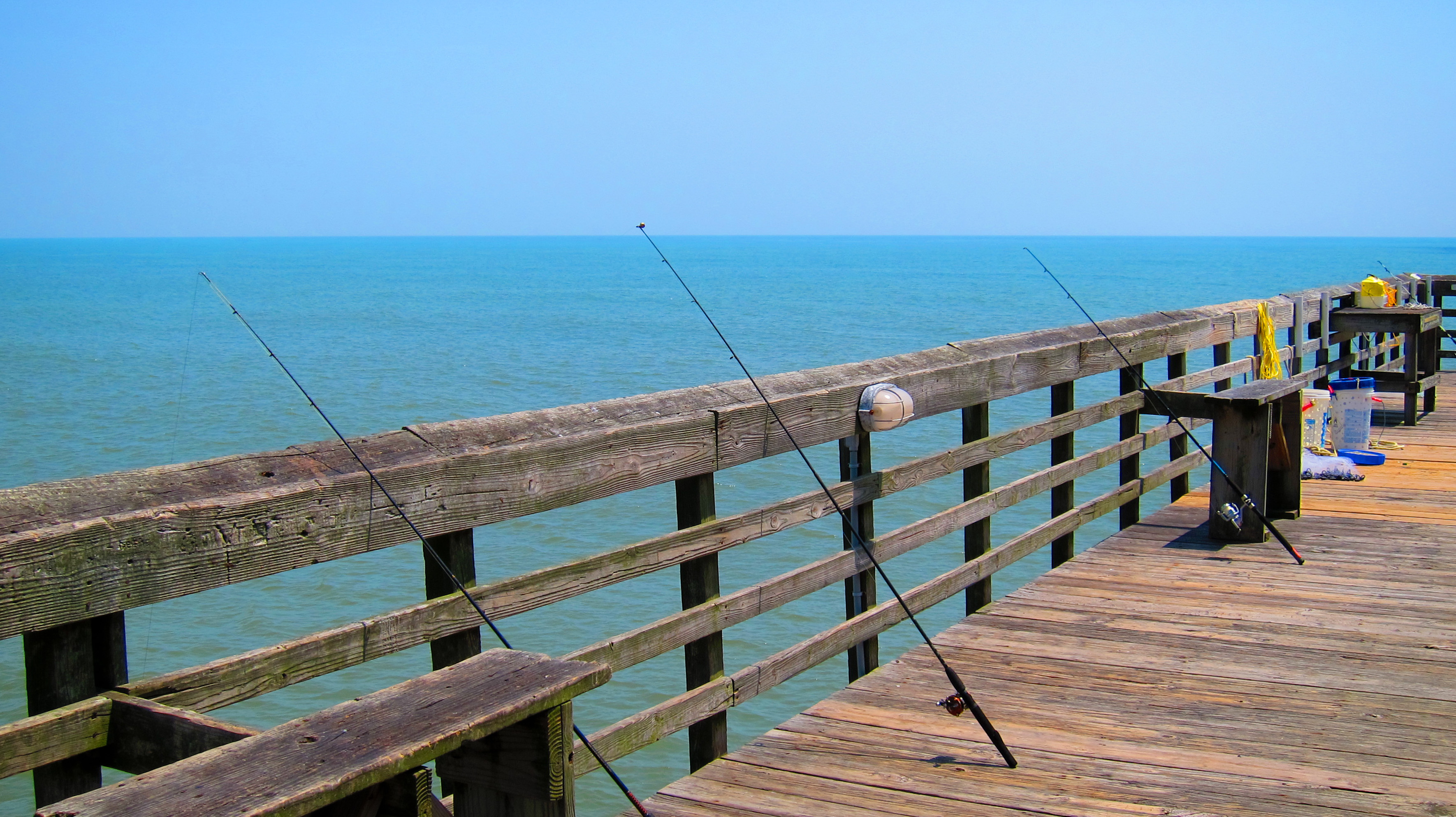
The pier with fishing poles cast off the side

The park has a fishing pier that stretches out into the Atlantic Ocean for prime fishing. A South Carolina fishing license is not required to fish from the pier; however, you do have to pay for daily fishing. An annual pass for the calendar year is available. Fishing for sharks is prohibited from the fishing pier. Surf fishing is allowed; however, it is not allowed on the beach where lifeguards are on duty and a South Carolina saltwater fishing license is required. Typical fish caught include flounder, king mackerel, sheepshead, whiting, spot, spanish mackerel, drum and blues.

For horseback riding, beach access is available beginning the third Saturday in November and continues through the last day of February . A permit is required for each horse that enters the park. Horses are not allowed in the park overnight. Riders must have current Negative Coggins papers for each horse brought into the park (per SC Code of Laws, Act 13, 1976, Sec 1, Chapter 13, Title 47).

A campground has 140 standard sites with individual water and electrical hookups and an additional 138 sites with full hookup. All sites are convenient to hot showers, restrooms and laundromat facilities and complimentary wi-fi access. The main campground is located approximately 300 yards from the beach. The overflow campground is for tents only, does not provide electricity and has central water. The 30-site overflow campground is open Easter weekend through Labor Day.Six cabins, located 200 yards from the beach, are completely furnished, heated, air-conditioned, and supplied with bath and bed linens, basic cooking and eating utensils and TV. A Ranger Station (store/registration located at the campground entrance) includes limited grocery items, camping supplies, souvenirs, drinks, snacks, and firewood.

== Environmental contamination ==
In May 2026, it was reported that a tidal creek north of Springmaid Pier carried very high levels of PFAS likely from decades of use of firefighting foam at the decommissioned Myrtle Beach Air Force Base. The S.C. Department of Environmental Services advised "people not to swim in water near stormwater pipes or swashes".
