= Henry Bellamann =

American novelist (1882–1945)

- Born: Heinrich Hauer Bellamann; April 28, 1882; Fulton, Missouri, U.S.
- Died: June 16, 1945 (aged 63); New York City, U.S.
- Occupations: Writer, Music educator
- Spouse: Katherine McKee Jones (m. 1907–1945)
- Writing career
- Genres: Fiction, poetry
- Notable works: Kings Row; The Gray Man Walks

Heinrich Hauer Bellamann (April 28, 1882 – June 16, 1945) was an American author, whose bestselling 1940 novel Kings Row exposed the hypocrisy of small-town life in the midwest, addressing many social taboos. Research suggested that Bellamann was working off resentment of his upbringing in Fulton, Missouri, where he had been ostracised for his German extraction and rumoured illegitimacy. The 1942 film version gave Ronald Reagan a starring role, regarded as his most memorable performance.

Bellamann was also a poet and a music professor at Vassar College.

== Early life and education ==
Bellamann was born in Fulton, Missouri in 1882 to parents George Henrik and Caroline (Krahenbuhl) Bellamann. After graduation from Fulton High School in 1899, he attended Westminster College in Fulton for a year then moved to Colorado in 1901 to study piano at the University of Denver. Following graduation in 1904, Bellamann began teaching music at a variety of girls' schools in the American South, including the Chicora College for Women. Bellamann met his future wife, Katherine McKee Jones, while both were teaching at a girls' academy in Tuscaloosa, Alabama. The couple married on September 3, 1907.

From 1908 to 1913 while on school summer breaks, the Bellamanns traveled to Europe so Henry could study organ and piano with Charles-Marie Widor and Isidor Philipp. From 1907 to 1932, when he began to pursue writing full-time, Bellamann held administrative and teaching positions at several educational institutions, including acting director of the Juilliard Musical Foundation, dean of the Curtis Institute of Music, and professor of music at Vassar College.

== Writing career ==
With the encouragement of his wife, Bellamann increasingly turned his attention to a writing career. A Music Teacher's Notebook, his first of three books of poetry, was published in 1920. It was followed by Cups of Illusion in 1923 and The Upward Pass in 1928. Although his poetry is today little-known, Bellamann was recognized by David Perkins in his 1976 History of Modern Poetry, in which he ranks Bellamann with the serious minor poets who "adopted the mode" of the Imagists. Bellamann also served as editor for the music magazine Overtones and wrote a weekly literary column, in which he highlighted the works of DuBose Heyward and Pulitzer Prize-winning author Julia Peterkin.

Petenera's Daughter, Bellamann's first novel, was published in 1926, followed by Crescendo in 1928, The Richest Woman in Town in 1932, and The Gray Man Walks in 1938.

=== Kings Row ===
The story of Drake McHugh and his best friend Parris Mitchell coming of age in a sleepy midwest American town of the 1890s was by far Henry Bellamann's most recognized work. Exposing hypocrisy and small-town secrets, the novel deals with themes of mental illness, incest, homosexuality, suicide, gender equality in relationships, and sadistic vengeance. Such themes were still somewhat taboo in early 20th-century American literature, but not unheard of.

The novel and its subsequent movie adaptation proved to be most controversial in Bellamann's hometown of Fulton, Missouri. It was not long before the citizenry of Fulton began to look around and realize Bellamann's fictional town was in fact a reinterpretation of their small city. "Aberdeen College" is seen as a stand-in for Bellamann's time spent at Westminster College, and the best-seller's asylum coincides with Fulton State Hospital. Prominent citizens as the real-life town doctor are portrayed in Kings Row in a less-than-flattering manner. As one local newspaper editor wrote, Bellamann "clearly intended to besmirch Fulton". The ill feelings toward the book lingered for many years in Fulton, to the point where librarians removed Kings Row from the town library shelves.

The root of this controversy seems to have lain with Bellamann. While researching the introduction for a re-issue of Kings Row in 1981, Jay Miles Karr, an English professor at Westminster College, found in Bellamann's private papers notes for what was referred to as "the Fulton novel." According to Karr, living in Fulton had inflicted a "psychic wound" on the young Bellamann, one he exorcised decades later with his pen. He often was made to feel alienated there because of his German heritage. Furthermore, the family reputation was assaulted by town gossip that George Bellamann might not have been Henry's true biological father. Interviews with his few childhood friends confirmed that Bellamann was regarded as a social outcast in the town.

Having made the best-seller list, Kings Row soon had a movie version in the works. Released in 1942, with some of the more controversial portions of the novel adulterated to satisfy the Hays Code, the film starred Ann Sheridan, Robert Cummings, and Ronald Reagan as Drake McHugh. Movie critics consider Reagan's performance in the film to be his best, and it was one of his favorite roles. In fact, he titled his 1965 autobiography Where's the Rest of Me? after one of his key lines in the movie, where a shocked and horrified McHugh discovers that both of his legs have been amputated.

== Later work and death ==
After the huge success of Kings Row, Bellamann published two more novels, Floods of Spring in 1942 and Victoria Grandolet in 1943. He began a sequel to Kings Row but died of a heart attack in their New York City home in June 1945 before its completion. His wife Katherine, a novelist and poet, finished the work, titled Parris Mitchell of Kings Row, publishing it in 1948.

Katherine Bellamann survived her husband by 11 years, dying in 1956. The Bellamanns had no children.

== Honors ==
Henry Bellamann received the Légion d'Honneur from the Republic of France and an honorary musical doctorate from DePauw University in Greencastle, Indiana.

== Bibliography ==
=== Fiction ===
- Petenera's Daughter. New York: Harcourt Brace, 1926.
- Crescendo. New York: Harcourt Brace, 1928.
- The Richest Woman in Town. New York: The Century Co., 1932.
- The Gray Man Walks. Garden City: Doubleday, Doran & Co., 1936.
- Kings Row. New York: The Sun Dial Press, 1940.
- Floods of Spring. New York: The Sun Dial Press, 1942.
- Victoria Grandolet. New York: Simon and Schuster, 1943.

=== Poetry ===
- A Music Teacher's Note Book. New York: The New York Poetry Book Shop, 1920.
- Cups of Illusion. New York: Houghton Mifflin, 1923.
- The Upward Pass. New York: Houghton Mifflin, 1928.
