= Chicora College =

Presbyterian college in South Carolina

Coordinates: 34.0109°N 81.0296°W

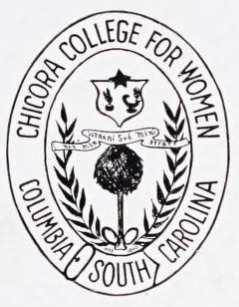
- Seal of Chicora College
- Former names: Chicora College for Young Ladies; Chicora College for Women
- Motto: Non ministrari sed ministrare
- Motto in English: Not to be served, but to serve
- Type: Private
- Active: 1893–1930
- Religious affiliation: Presbyterian Church (USA)
- Location: Greenville and Columbia, South Carolina, United States

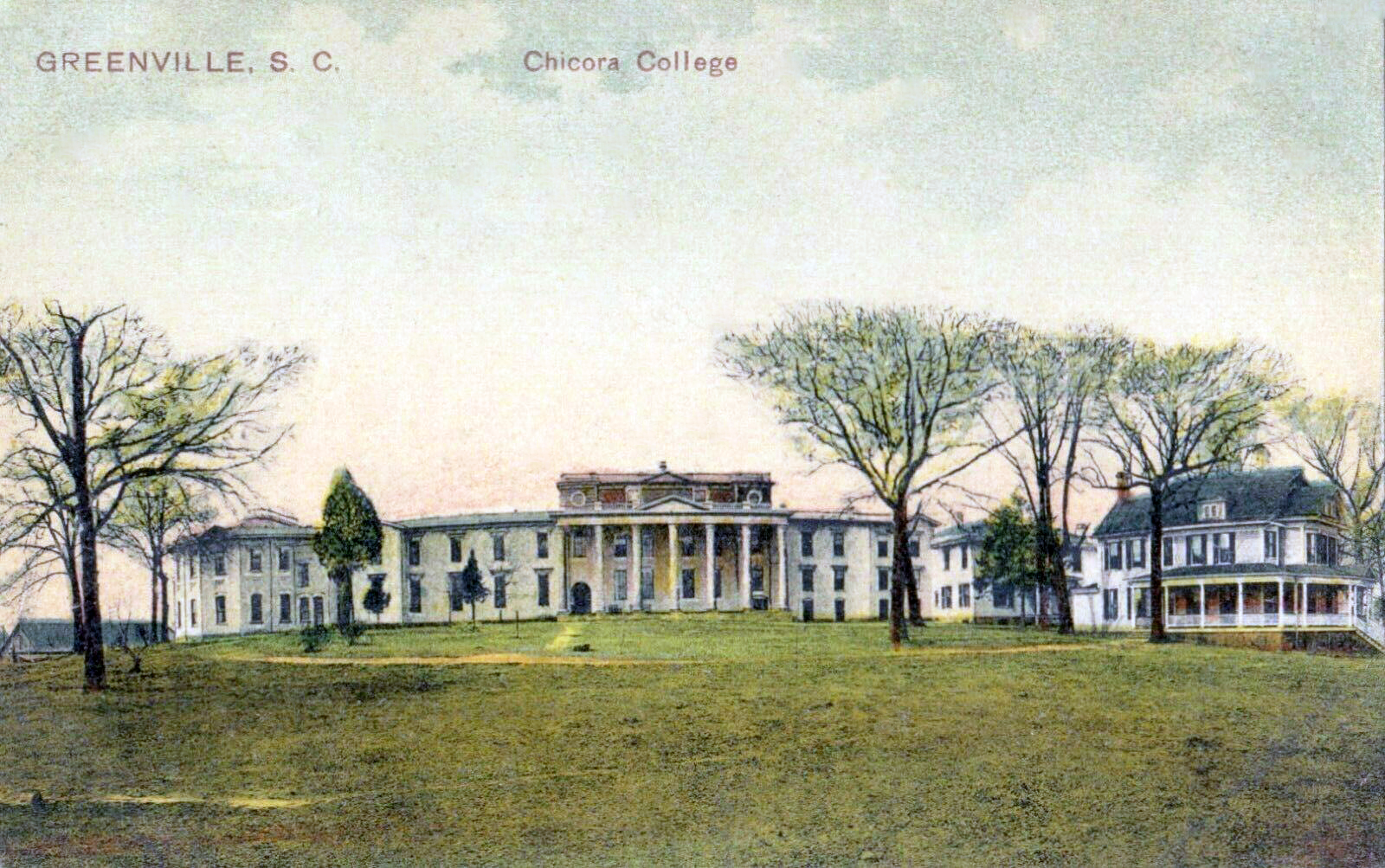
Chicora College, Greenville, 1910

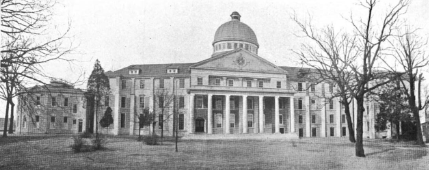
Chicora College auditorium building in Greenville, South Carolina

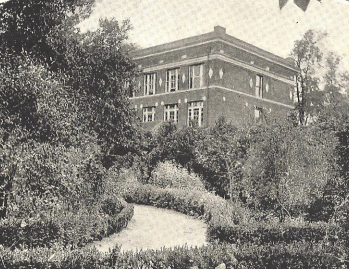
Chicora College for Women in Columbia, South Carolina, 1916

Chicora College, also called Chicora College for Women, was a Presbyterian women's college in Greenville and Columbia, South Carolina. It operated from 1893 to 1930 when it merged with Queens College in Charlotte, North Carolina.

== History ==
In 1893, the First Presbyterian Church in Greenville, South Carolina, decided to start a college for women. On August 12, 1893, the board of trustees was established for the Greenville Female Seminary with E. A. Smith as president. On September 20, 1893, it opened as the Chicora College. They selected the name Chicora the first Native American tribe that explorers met on the coast of South Carolina. Its president was J. F. McKinnon. It was not accredited; this was normal for colleges in South Carolina at the time.

The church contributed $1,000 to rent a house for the college and later purchased a property that was previously the home of Alexander McBee. Tuition for the college was $38 a year or $160 with room and board. The college's enrollment was around 200 students. The religious influence at Chicora was of "first importance". Its students were not allowed to write letters or speak on Sundays and could not have visits or any communication from young men. Its motto was "Non ministrari sed ministrare" or "Not to be served, but to serve".

The college catalog called the institution the Chicora College for Young Ladies for the first time in 1897; however, some sources suggest that this name was in use when the college first started. Rev. S. R. Preston, pastor of Second Presbyterian Church in Greenville, became the second president of the college in May 1899. In 1901, the college had 77 students. Students came from Greenville, fifteen counties in South Carolina, Georgia, and Florida.

The Bethel, Enoree, and South Carolina presbyteries of the Presbyterian Church in the United States (P.C.U.S.) purchased the college in 1906. They recharted it as Chicora College, a Presbyterian institution, on May 30, 1906. Rev. Samuel Craig Byrd became the college's third president on June 1, 1906.

In 1908, tuition for the literary course was $183, including room, board, general elocution, a servant's assistance, reading room fees, heat, light, and access to the infirmary if needed. For $203, additional services included training in expanded elocution, musical instruments, or voice. The college had 235 students in 1909. Soon, it began to outgrow its campus.

The textile mills of Greenville began to decline in the early 20th century, negatively impacting the city's West End, where the college was located. In 1914, the college moved to Columbia, South Carolina, and merged with The College for Women in Columbia. The college retired its debts by selling its Greenville campus. The renamed Chicora College for Women opened for students in 1915, with Byrd continuing as its president.

In 1921, Presbyterian College stopped admitting women and referred its existing female students to Chicora, in part to strengthen the women's college. Chicora college became the largest Presbyterian college in the South by the end of 1921. The college's board of trustees started planning a new campus on 55 acres in Wales Garden in east Columbia. Having outgrown its location, the college reported turning away students in 1925. The presbyteries approved $250,000 in bonds to purchase the site for the new campus.

However, the college lacked an endowment and still had debt despite having the largest enrollment in its history. Instead of moving to the Wales Garden location, the college expanded to the former Columbia Seminary campus in 1927. The South Carolina Presbyterians began to have concerns about the viability of supporting both Chicora College and Presbyterian College and began discussing merging the women's college with another institution. In 1929, the presbyteries transferred ownership of Chicora College to the Presbyterian Synod of South Carolina which assumed its bonded debt. When the Great Depression hit in 1929, plans for the new campus and Chicora College ended.

On March 24, 1930, the Synod of South Carolina met to consider merging the college with Queens College, a Presbyterian institution for women in Charlotte, North Carolina. Queens College, a Presbyterian institution in Charlotte, North Carolina. As part of the merger agreement, Chicora sold all of its assets and turned over the proceeds to Queens College; the latter agreed to archive Chicora's records relating to students and alumni. At the time, its real estate was worth $422,500; its bond debt was $233,000 and other debts totaled $100,000.

The merged institution was called Queens-Chicora College from 1930 to 1939. However, the Synod struggled to meet its financial obligations to the new college for the next nineteen years because it was unable to sell the Chicora College property and had to pay out $250,000 on the bonds.

The institution later changed its name to Queens College of Charlotte and survives today as Queens University of Charlotte.

== Campus ==
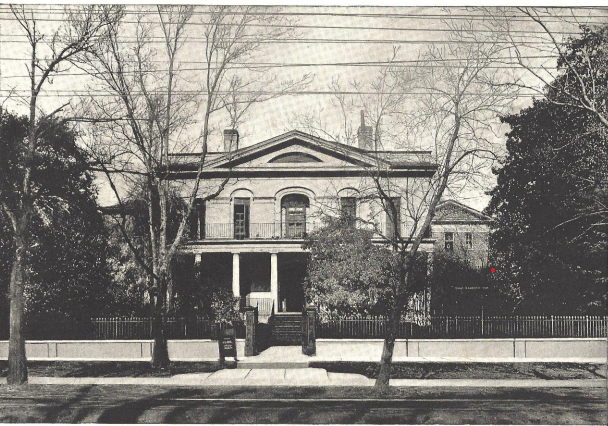
Hampton-Preston House, 1916

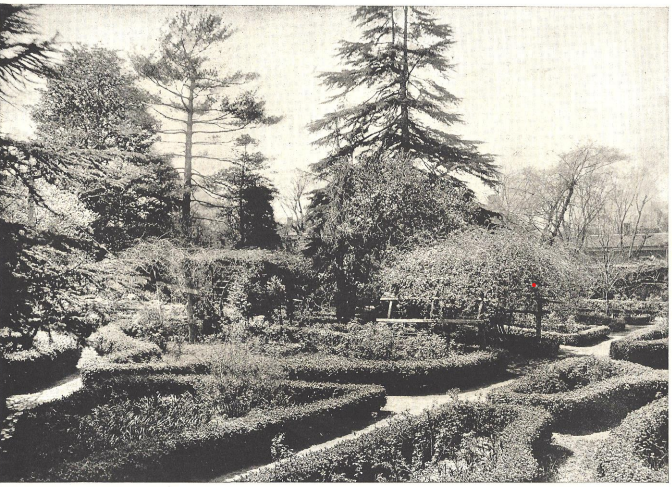
Chicora College for Women gardens, 1916

The college started in a house rented on McBee Avenue in Greenville. Later, a property known as McBee Terrace was purchased on the west side of the Reedy River. The new college campus consisted of sixteen acres that went from Camperdown Street to River Street and overlooked the river. The campus expanded to include a dormitory, administrative buildings, a president's house, and a 1,200-seat domed octagonal auditorium. Its grounds had landscaping that extended down to the river. The campus was accessible by the Greenville and Columbia Railroad.

When the college moved to Columbia in 1915, it was located in the Hampton-Preston House that had previously housed The College for Women in Columbia. Its gardens covered a city block.

The auditorium building of the original campus in Greenville burned in 1919. The former college's remaining buildings were eventually demolished.

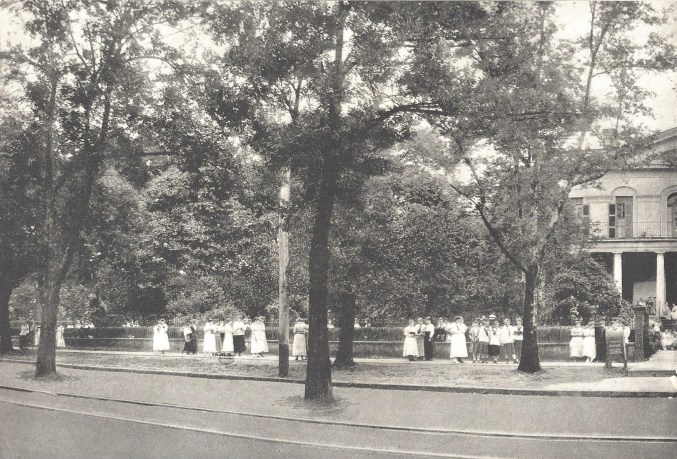
Students on campus at Chicora College for Women, 1916

== Academics ==
Originally, Chicora included an elementary school for boys and girls and a high school for girls, as well as a four-year college for women. Its curriculum was Presbyterian-oriented and included Bible study.

Students at Chicora College studied the liberal arts, modern and classical languages (French, Italian, German, and Spanish), Bible studies, the sciences (chemistry, natural sciences, and physics), photography, physical culture (gymnastics), domestic science/home economics, general elocution, and business skills such as bookkeeping and typing. Students could pay extra to study the "ornamental arts", including drawing, elocution, and music. Students were also taught a variety of sports.

In 1919, the school had a College of Liberal Arts and Sciences and a College for Fine Arts that included Schools of Art and Expression and a Conservatory of Music "under European-trained specialists." It offered B.A., B.S., B.Ped., and M.A. degrees. Its faculty included twelve instructors with B.A. and M.A. degrees. The college also had a small library with 5,000 books.

== Student activities ==
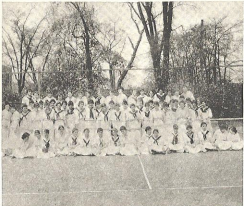
Chicora College for Women tennis, 1916

The college's students published the Chicora Magazine and The Clarion yearbook, later called Nods and Becks. Other student activities included the YWCA, the Glee Club, and the Music Club. Other groups included the Westminster League, the Cochran Literary Society, the Kratian Literary Society, the Preston Literary Society, and the Athletics Association. There was also a Student Co-operative Association that included student government and supported "college spirit". It had more than twenty local social sororities.

In 1925, athletics included varsity and junior basketball, varsity tennis, and track.

== Legacy ==
The Hampton–Preston House, a former campus in Columbia, is now a history museum that includes a recreation of dormitory rooms as they existed in 1915. The Hampton-Preston House was listed in the National Register of Historic Places on July 29, 1969.

== Notable people ==
=== Alumnae ===
- Margaret Jarman Hagood – sociologist and demographer

=== Faculty ===
- Henry Bellamann – director of the School of Fine Arts; later a noted novelist

== See also ==
- List of colleges and universities in South Carolina
- List of current and historical women's universities and colleges in the United States
