= South Carolina Technical College System =

The SC Technical College System is a statewide network of 16 technical colleges in South Carolina.

== Colleges ==
Location of SC Technical College System campuses. For colleges with multiple campuses, the flagship campus is labeled.

SC Technical College System institutions
Name	Established	Enrollment	Location
Aiken Technical College	1972	1,925	Aiken
Central Carolina Technical College	1962	2,885	Sumter
Denmark Technical College	1948	491	Denmark
Florence-Darlington Technical College	1963	3,125	Florence
Greenville Technical College	1960	10,536	Greenville
Horry-Georgetown Technical College	1966	7,417	Conway
Midlands Technical College	1947	8,794	Columbia
Northeastern Technical College	1968	1,465	Cheraw
Orangeburg-Calhoun Technical College	1968	2,257	Orangeburg
Piedmont Technical College	1966	4,712	Greenwood
Spartanburg Community College	1963	8,247	Spartanburg
Technical College of the Lowcountry	1967	2,349	Beaufort
Tri-County Technical College	1962	5,780	Pendleton
Trident Technical College	1973	13,219	North Charleston
Williamsburg Technical College	1969	635	Kingstree
York Technical College	1964	4,521	Rock Hill
