= AVX Corporation =

American electronic component manufacturer

- Type: Private
- Industry: electronics
- Founded: 1972
- Headquarters: Greenville, SC, United States
- Key people: John Sarvis (CEO); John Lawing (CTO); Kurt P. Cummings (CFO)
- Products: capacitors, connectors electronic components Ceramic capacitors varistors, thermistors EMI Filters
- Revenue: $1,312.661 mil fy 2017▲9.8%
- Net income: $125.785 mil fy 2017▲23.8%
- Total assets: $2,477.413 mil ▲2.8%
- Number of employees: 10,800 (March 2017)
- Parent: Kyocera
- Divisions: Passive Components; KED Resale; AVX Interconnect (a.k.a. Elco)
- Website: www.avx.com

AVX Corporation is an American manufacturer of electronic components headquartered in Fountain Inn, South Carolina. It is the largest industrial employer in Horry County, South Carolina, with almost 1000 workers in Myrtle Beach and Conway. AVX has 9,900 employees and operates in the United States, Europe and Asia. AVX is a subsidiary of Kyocera Electronics Corporation.

2012 sales were $1.545 billion. Capital expenditure for the year 2010 was at a five-year low of $28.888 million 34.6% lower than the year before and sixty percent less than in 2008, earnings per share grew 78.7% even though total sales fell (although revenue grew with each successive quarter since April 2009)

As of October 1, 2021, the company changed their name to KYOCERA AVX Components Corporation and will use the KYOCERA AVX as the business brand.

== Products ==
AVX has three business units. Passive Components includes electrical components for automotive braking, cell phones, copiers, hearing aids, and locomotives. KED Resale sells Kyocera products including ceramic and tantalum capacitors. Connectors are used in the automotive and medical industries.

Major customers of AVX include Motorola, Nokia and Robert Bosch GmbH.

As of 2011, nearly half of the company's sales are made in Asia.

The logo of Aerovox Corporation

== History ==
AVX began in 1972 making ceramic capacitors as a subsidiary of Aerovox Corporation, a company founded in 1922 as Radiola Wireless Corporation, which made radios. In June 1973, AVX became the parent company when assets of Aerovox were sold. That same year, Marshall D. Butler, who played a major role in the company's growth, became chairman and CEO.

Butler had cofounded Alloys Unlimited Inc. in 1957, which was sold to London-based Plessey Co. in 1970; Butler stayed for several years as president of the Plessey subsidiary. With his experience in the semiconductor field, Butler decided AVX should emphasize multilayer ceramic capacitors (MLCCs), used in the rapidly expanding integrated circuit field. Butler sold two other divisions and started a five-year plan. The company's $20 million investment and careful analysis of the market resulted in 1979 sales of $95 million and dominance of the market; the goal, based on 30 percent annual growth, had been $83 million.

AVX added operations in Europe, but moving into Japan proved more difficult because of Japan's protected home market. The company's license would not let it sell in Japan, but Kyocera Corporation could sell its products in the United States. Kyocera CEO Kazuo Inamori agreed with Butler that the situation needed to be changed, and Kyocera ended the unfair provision. In 1979 AVX started a Japanese subsidiary.

During the 1980s, growth continued, with 1984 sales reaching $234 million. But that year, it became clear that computer manufacturers had bought more capacitors than needed, and a slowdown began in the industry. AVX continued to grow through new product research and buying other companies. By the end of the decade sales reached $450 million.

In the late 1980s, the European operations of AVX represented one-fourth of sales. AVX wanted to manufacture parts for Kyocera, which had only 2 percent of its sales in Europe and hoped to increase that before the European Community made that more difficult. Inamori wanted to buy AVX rather than partner with the company. After a $267 million stock purchase, AVX has operated as part of Kyocera Corp. since January 18, 1990.

Butler retired as CEO in 1993 but remained on the board of directors. Benedict P. Rosen, an employee since the company's start, became the new CEO. By 1995, sales reached almost $1 billion after significant growth for personal computers and cell phones. At the same time, the automotive, home appliance and medical industries needed electronic components, and advanced electronic systems needed capacitors as well. AVX also sold Kyocera products worldwide and helped the company start operations in Mexico and Indonesia. Kyocera helped AVX start manufacturing connectors.

In 1995, Kyocera sold one-fourth of AVX for $557 million, which more than returned the company's investment in AVX, even though Kyocera still owned three-fourths of the company. AVX used the money to enter the connector business and increase its manufacturing of ceramic and tantalum capacitors.

The boom in the capacitor industry once again proved temporary, after customers bought more products than they needed. But in 1998, personal computers and cell phones contributed to more growth, as did newer electronics in cars. At the same time, material prices went up, and an Asian currency crisis added to AVX's troubles. Layoffs resulted, but by 2000 the company was doing well again, adding operations in El Salvador and the Czech Republic (Lanškroun).

By the end of fiscal 2001, AVX had 26 plants in 12 countries, 21,000 employees, and sales of $2.6 billion. But a recession put an end to the good times, and revenues dropped to $1.25 billion; employee numbers totalled 12,500. Production moved to the Czech Republic in the late 1990s and China from 2005 onwards.

The industry situation appeared to improve by 2004, though AVX still lost money.

In April 2009 the company decided to close a number of its smaller worldwide factories including its flagship manufacturing plant in Paignton, England following the credit crunch in an effort to reduce costs and remain financially viable for shareholders.

On December 3, 2009, AVX announced it would move corporate headquarters to Greenville, South Carolina, with about 150 jobs leaving the Myrtle Beach area. The company planned no change to manufacturing in Conway and Myrtle Beach.

In 2011, AVX announced plans to tear down the original Myrtle Beach plant built in 1949 and updated in 1985, with manufacturing operations continuing at a nearby location on the same land. The demolition took place in 2015.

In 2018, AVX closed an electronic component manufacturing plant in Olean, New York. The plant has been on the EPA Superfund site list since the early 1980s. It is the suspected source of a plume of trichloroethylene (TCE) that leached into the East Olean aquifer.

== Manufacturing and development ==
=== Americas ===
In the US, the company’s thin-film operations in Jacksonville, Florida, and Myrtle Beach, South Carolina, design and manufacture components and custom hybrid circuits. Their products include resistors, capacitors, inductors, filters and integrated passive devices. The Biddeford, Maine, operation designs and manufactures tantalum capacitors.

AVX opened its Salvadoran manufacturing operation in 1977. The plant in Ilopango manufactures tantalum, niobium and multilayer ceramic capacitors, with product and process design support from the company’s US and Czech operations.

=== Europe ===
AVX began working with Tesla Lanškroun in 1990. The Lanškroun factory now makes tantalum electrolytic capacitors and has a research and development department. Processes developed at the factory are also used elsewhere in the company’s tantalum division. KYOCERA AVX has three other Czech plants: two in Uherské Hradiště and one in Bzenec.

In Uherské Hradiště, two plants make ceramic, thin-film and power capacitors, as well as varistors and thermistors. The Bzenec plant makes contacts, moulds plastic parts and assembles connectors.

Coleraine, Northern Ireland, designs and manufactures multilayer ceramic capacitors, including products qualified for space applications. Production is shared with Uherské Hradiště, where activities include termination, plating and assembly.

In Germany, Werne develops position and speed sensors and accelerator pedal modules, and carries out some series production. Klingenberg develops and manufactures pressure, temperature and fluid-property sensors, as well as electromechanical assemblies.

=== Asia ===
In November 2022, KYOCERA AVX announced the opening of a ceramic- and tantalum-capacitor manufacturing facility in Nakhon Ratchasima, Thailand. The investment exceeded US$300 million. The facility includes approximately 1.2 million square feet (111,000 square metres) of manufacturing and warehousing space.

The Jerusalem operation provides product design, research and development, and technical and management support for the company’s thin-film component business, including manufacturing in Uherské Hradiště.

== Litigation ==
In 2007, Myrtle Beach property owners near the AVX plant filed suit, claiming trichloroethylene (TCE) used at the plant until the 1980s has polluted their neighborhood and lowered property values. Another lawsuit claimed the pollution had stopped a condominium development in the area. A consultant for one of the land owners, Horry Land Co., discovered the pollution in 2006 while doing environmental testing prior to development of a portion of the land. In 2009, AVX claimed Myrtle Beach Air Force Base caused at least part of the pollution, and the company added the Air Force to one of several lawsuits. A geologist for AVX claims the pollution could be cleaned up in five years and Horry Land is not entitled to compensation, while the consultant for Horry Land claims there is no way to tell how long cleanup will take, since AVX has been trying to clean up its own pollution for 28 years.

On February 22, 2010, U.S. District Court Judge Terry Wooten ruled that evidence in the Horry Land suit showed the plaintiffs were entitled to a trial. On February 23, 2011, the trial began in Florence, South Carolina. In May 2011, Wooten ruled that AVX caused the pollution, and county property records show that AVX purchased 21.5 acres of contaminated land for $4.6 million.

AVX appealed Wooten's 2011 decision on whether the Air Force should help with the cost of cleanup. S.C. DHEC stated in a March 13, 2012 letter that pollution in some areas came from AVX, but in one area another source was responsible. AVX argued that the government's expert, who said groundwater from the base flowed away from the polluted areas, was not qualified to testify about groundwater. The findings could influence an upcoming class-action lawsuit by property owners.

On October 25, 2012, The Sun News reported that a panel of federal appeals court judges had indicated that they would not overturn a lower court's ruling, thereby granting the electronics components manufacturer a new trial on its groundwater contamination case. AVX claimed that Wooten made a legal error in its 2011 trial by allowing an unqualified expert witness to testify.

On July 22, 2013, a jury was selected for the second of three lawsuits regarding pollution on land owned by JDS Development of Myrtle Beach LLC, which asked for damages and lost income from condominiums that were never built. AVX counters that the economic downturn caused the failure of the Southern Pines project, and blames the Air Force for part of the pollution. The suit was filed in 2008 and the trial was scheduled for 2012, but insufficient jurors led to a delay. The jury awarded $500,000 in actual damages and $250,000 in punitive damages to JDS, but AVX wanted that amount reduced to no more than $397,500, claiming JDS did not provide "expert testimony" to support its views, or evidence Southern Pines would have been a success.

On October 8, 2014, it was announced that AVX agreed to pay $1.2 million to the owners of 42 properties with TCE contamination. Property owners still needed to approve the settlement, which attorney Gene Connell called "reasonable". The agreement would mean the dismissal of a class-action suit filed nearly seven years earlier.

Documents filed August 5, 2015 show that property owners could sue AVX after a majority of the S.C. Supreme Court reversed a decision by Circuit Court Judge Benjamin Culbertson to dismiss their case. The ruling allows the determination of whether the facts of the case will result in a "stigma damages" policy.
