= Margaret Jarman Hagood =

Statistician, sociologist, demographer

- Born: Margaret Loyd Jarman; October 26, 1907; Newton County, Georgia, U.S.
- Died: August 13, 1963 (aged 55); San Diego, California, U.S.
- Education: Queens College; Emory University; University of North Carolina (PhD)
- Scientific career
- Workplaces: University of North Carolina; U.S. Department of Agriculture
- Doctoral advisor: Howard W. Odum

Margaret Jarman Hagood (October 26, 1907 – August 13, 1963) was an American sociologist and demographer who "helped steer sociology away from the armchair and toward the calculator". She wrote the books Mothers of the South (1939) and Statistics for Sociologists (1941), and later became president of the Population Association of America and of the Rural Sociological Society.

== Early life and education ==
Margaret Loyd Jarman was born on October 26, 1907, in Newton County, Georgia, where she grew up. She was one of six children of Lewis Jarman, a mathematician who became vice president of Queens College in Charlotte, North Carolina and later president of Mary Baldwin College in Virginia. After acting as a teenage country preacher, briefly studying at the Chicora College for Women in Columbia, South Carolina, and at Agnes Scott College in Atlanta, Georgia, marrying a dental student, giving birth to a daughter in 1927, teaching in a schoolhouse in Brewton, Alabama, and separating from her husband, she earned a bachelor's degree in 1929 from Queens College. She continued her studies at Emory University, where she was awarded a master's degree in 1930.

She taught mathematics at a seminary in Washington, D.C., until the mid-1930s, when she returned to her graduate studies at the University of North Carolina, studying sociology under the supervision of her father's childhood neighbor, Howard W. Odum. Her studies at this time concerned depression-era white farm women in the US South, including analyses of fertility and contraception usage. She completed her doctorate in 1937.

== Career and later life ==
Hagood continued to work in the UNC Institute for Research in Social Science from 1937 until 1942. Beginning in World War II, in 1942, she moved to the United States Department of Agriculture, in its Bureau of Agricultural Economics, where she performed statistical analyses of farming people. Although she originally planned to remain there only for the duration of the war, and then return to academia, she ended up continuing to work at the USDA, and was promoted to head of the Farm Population and Rural Life Division in 1952.

Her work at the Bureau of Agricultural Economics took her through a time of upheaval as the bureau shifted from qualitative to more quantitative analyses, and included the development of new methods for calibrating standards of living across different regions of the country. She retired in 1962, and died of a heart attack at the home of her brother in San Diego, California, on August 13, 1963.

== Books ==
Hagood published the book Mothers of the South: Portraiture of the White Tenant Farm (1939) based on interviews she conducted in the field studies for her doctoral research. It presents both data and the life stories of approximately 240 women, split between the Piedmont and Deep South, concluding that their high fertility "is socially undesirable". Sarah Case (2004) writes that the book is "a generally sympathetic and thoughtful portrait" and that Hagood "was unique and pathbreaking in acknowledging the gender inequities" that affected these women's lives. The book was reprinted by Greenwood Press in 1969 and again by the University of Virginia Press in 1996.

She wrote her second book, the textbook Statistics for Sociologists (1941), based on a course she taught at UNC. After visiting the University of Wisconsin in 1951, she published a revised edition of Statistics for Sociologists (with Daniel O. Price) in 1952. Denton E. Morrison and Ramon E. Henkel (2006) write that this book "was an early and continuing influence on sociological practice in statistics in general and significance tests in particular".

== Recognition ==
In 1949, Hagood was elected as a Fellow of the American Statistical Association. She became president of the Population Association of America in 1955 and of the Rural Sociological Society in 1956, the first female president of that organization. In 1955, Queens College awarded her an honorary doctorate.
