= Myrtle Beach Air Force Base =

United States Air Force base located near Myrtle Beach, South Carolina

- Near Myrtle Beach, South Carolina in United States

Site information
- Type: Military base
- Operator: United States Air Force (former)
- Status: Closed

Location
- Coordinates: 33°40′47″N 78°55′42″W

Myrtle Beach Air Force Base was a United States Air Force base located in Myrtle Beach, South Carolina over 3,937 acres. A municipal airport built in 1939, the Army Air Corps took over the site for training pilotsduring WWII. In November 1947 the site was deactivated and returned to the city and became Myrtle Beach Municipal Airport again. On 1 April 1956 the site was activated as Myrtle Beach Air Force Base once more. The base closed on 31 March 1993.

As of 2013, the former base included more than 1,200 homes, several parks and sports facilities, an American Red Cross headquarters, a Veterans Affairs clinic, International Technology and Aerospace Park (ITAP), new terminals at Myrtle Beach International Airport, and The Market Common, a retail complex. The Whispering Pines golf course went to the city of Myrtle Beach. AVX Corporation received land next to its existing plant for a research and development facility. Horry-Georgetown Technical College built a new campus. In May 2026, it was reported that a tidal creek north of Springmaid Pier carried very high levels of PFAS.

== Geography ==
The base is located within the confines of the city of Myrtle Beach, South Carolina roughly at its southern end. It is bordered by the Intracoastal Waterway and US Highway 17 in the North and South Kings Highway in the South. Myrtle Beach State Park is immediately Southwest of the former base.

== Early history ==
On 16 October 1939, Myrtle Beach Town Council agreed that the community "is in dire need of a modern municipal airport". The town agreed to purchase 135 acres for $35 per acre from Myrtle Beach Farms, Inc., described as "a partnership between Simeon B. Chapin and the Burroughs brothers." Two weeks later the airport was named Harrelson Municipal Airport after Mayor W.L. Harrelson, a supporter of the project. Federal funds were used to build two of the runways.

The Army Air Corps wanted to use the site for training pilots, and took over the airport in June 1940. For a short time it was used by the 3rd Observation Sq., 105th Observation Sq., and 112th Observation Sq. used the site during the next year. In September 1941 it was Distribution Point 1, Morris Field. On 21 November 1941, the United States Department of War acquired 6700 acres including the airport, and during World War II the formal establishment of a base took place on 24 March 1942, with the name Myrtle Beach General Bombing and Gunnery Range, with the units 3rd AAF and later 519th Base HQ and Air Base Sq.

A "wooden city" known as Splinter City included barracks, a hospital, offices and other facilities. Training was urgently needed and the base was used for this purpose six months after construction began. German prisoners of war were also kept here. On 8 November 1943, the 5000-acre base became Myrtle Beach Army Air Field. Units included 351st AAF, 136th AAF, and 317th AAF (later AF) Air Base Unit. After the war, uses of the base included recruiting and support activities. 114 buildings had gone up.

On 1 November 1947 the site was deactivated and returned to the city and became 'Myrtle Beach Municipal Airport . The city leased part of the base, and Aerovox, Piedmont Airlines and a turkey farm also used land on the base. The Boston Braves trained there.

The city decided not to use the airport, but the federal government required that funds from the property be used for an airport, and starting in 1958 the funds were used for an airport in Crescent Beach. Horry County Jetport was moved to its current location in 1976.

== Air Force ==
The city donated land which the United States Air Force took over 1 June 1954, and Myrtle Beach Air Force Base was activated 1 April 1956. Many of the older buildings were torn down as the base modernized. The first unit in 1955 was the 727th Aircraft Control and Warning Squadron. Other units were the 4434th Air Base Squadron (replaced by the 342nd Fighter-Day Wing), the 455th Fighter Day Group, and the 113th Tactical Fighter Wing, Det 1, 728th Tactical Control Squadron. From 1958 to 1993 the base was home to the 354th Fighter Day Wing/Tactical Fighter Wing. As of 1966, the base had only one squadron with others having been deployed. The 354th Tactical Fighter Wing was re-activated and transferred (without personnel or equipment) to Myrtle Beach AFB, SC on 15 June 1970, absorbing the resources of the 4554th TFW at Myrtle Beach AFB, SC. The 354 TFW was charged with combat crew training in T-33s and with becoming proficient in A-7D aircraft, with the first aircraft arriving in November 1970

On 1 November 1970, the 355 TFS was reactivated and was reassigned to the 354 TFW, being the first Myrtle Beach squadron to be equipped with A-7D's. An agreement to use the base jointly for civilian and military operation began 19 July 1975, with Horry County Jetport moving from Crescent Beach and using the northeast part of the base. The city of Myrtle Beach annexed the base 20 April 1977. A phaseout of the A-7D at Myrtle Beach AFB started in the summer of 1974, with the A-7D's being transferred to Air National Guard units. These transfers continued until 1978, when the last A-7D was sent to the South Carolina ANG.

The A-10 Thunderbolt II "Warthog" attack jets were stationed at Myrtle Beach Air Force Base in South Carolina from 1977 until the base closed in 1993.

Units from the base participated in the Cold War, the Berlin Crisis, the Cuban Missile Crisis and Operation Desert Storm. During the 1980s three of the squadrons were sent to Germany, England, Egypt, Korea, Hawaii, Cuba and Puerto Rico. In 1990, the 354th was the first unit sent to Saudi Arabia after Iraq invaded Kuwait.

== Closing, 1993 ==
In 1991, after the National Defense Authorization Act, the announcement came that Myrtle Beach Air Force Base would close.

The Myrtle Beach base used the A-10 Warthog jet, and Pat McCullough of the Base Realignment and Closure Commission said the Air Force considered the jet "limited to a low-threat environment", while the Army believed it was "a very powerful close-air support asset." The Air Force chose to phase out the A-10, which led to the base's closing, but the Army wanted the A-10 to continue flying; the decision to keep the A-10 came after the decision to close had been made.

The base closed on 31 March 1993.

== Redevelopment ==
The base's closing was expected to mean losing over 5000 jobs, having 1500 homes to sell, 15 percent fewer students going to area schools, 20 percent unemployment, and $91 million lost in taxes and other revenues.

McCullough believed the earlier closing gave the base the best opportunity for reuse than would have been possible had the closing occurred later, during a recession.

Retired Air Force colonel Buddy Styers headed the Myrtle Beach Air Force Base Redevelopment Authority starting in August 1995. The authority, started in 1994, soon began working with the city of Myrtle Beach and Design Works, L.C., to develop a master plan to take advantage of existing structures and create development not necessarily related to tourism.

For the first several years, the Myrtle Beach area received little help from the economic development conveyance program intended to help communities struggling after bases closed. Myrtle Beach was viewed as a prosperous tourist area. A Wall Street Journal article and a new vision for tourism-related development from Burroughs & Chapin helped the area replace the jobs lost. With the state providing revenue from alcohol taxes, and later a portion of taxes paid by federal employees at bases in the state, the authority made progress toward redevelopment of the base. Later, the federal government changed the rules for helping communities affected by base closings, and Myrtle Beach received what was needed. The state legislature also made it possible to issue $41 million in bonds using the base land as a tax increment financing district.

In 2013, 20 years after the closing, the 3,937 acres that were once the base included more than 1,200 homes, several parks and sports facilities, an American Red Cross headquarters, a Veterans Affairs clinic, International Technology and Aerospace Park (ITAP), new terminals at Myrtle Beach International Airport, and The Market Common, a retail complex. The Whispering Pines golf course went to the city of Myrtle Beach. AVX Corporation received land next to its existing plant for a research and development facility. Horry-Georgetown Technical College built a new campus. Crabtree Gymnasium includes a military museum. Warbird Park includes a Wall of Service on which anyone who served honorably from 1941 to 1993 could receive a granite nameplate. An $800,000 World War II memorial was dedicated November 9, 2023. 20 years after the base closed, Retired Air Force colonel Styers no longer had a full-time job, but he still worked to spend $200,000 a year in federal grant money on improvements to the airport, like adding a ramp and taxiway at ITAP.

In 2017, a $200,000 grant from the redevelopment authority was to help to fund Thunderbolt Park, named for the A-10 Thunderbolts that flew at the base. A former base building at the Farrow Parkway location was to be renovated, to create a classroom. $1.2 million had been raised as of October 2017.

== Environmental contamination ==
In May 2026, it was reported that a tidal creek north of Springmaid Pier carried very high levels of PFAS likely from decades of use of fire fighting foam at the Myrtle Beach Air Force Base. These drained onto popular sections of the Myrtle Beach State Park. The S.C. Department of Environmental Services advised "people not to swim in water near stormwater pipes or swashes".
