= Central Carolina Technical College =

College in Sumter, South Carolina, U.S.

- Type: Public community college
- Established: 1962
- Parent institution: South Carolina Technical College System
- President: Jennifer Wilbanks
- Faculty: 101
- Administrative staff: 145
- Students: 3,314
- Location: Sumter, South Carolina, South Carolina, United States; 33.9335°N 80.3710°W
- Colors: Navy Blue and Yellow
- Mascot: Titan
- Website: www.cctech.edu

Central Carolina Technical College (CCTC) is a public community college in Sumter, South Carolina. It is part of the South Carolina Technical College System.

The institution was established in 1962, when the South Carolina legislature created the Sumter Area Technical Education Center. The school changed its name in 1971 to the Sumter Area Technical College; it took its current name in 1992. It received its initial accreditation from the Commission on Colleges of the Southern Association of Colleges and Schools in 1974.

CCTC primarily serves four regions in South Carolina which include Clarendon, Lee, Kershaw and Sumter counties. The college offers certificates, associate degrees and diploma programs to prepare students to enter the job market, to transfer to senior colleges, and to achieve their professional and personal goals.

== Campus locations ==
- Main Campus, located at 506 N. Guignard Dr., Sumter, SC, has been the point from which Central Carolina has continued to expand throughout the four-county service areas of Clarendon, Kershaw, Lee and Sumter counties.
- Advanced Manufacturing Technology Training Center, located at 853 Broad St., Sumter, SC.
- F.E. DuBose Campus, located at 3351 Sumter Highway, Manning, SC just north of Manning on U.S. 521 in Clarendon County.
- Health Science Center, located at 133 S. Main St., Sumter, SC in Downtown Sumter. The state-of-art facility features simulation labs, lecture halls, meeting and study rooms, and viewing areas, in addition to classrooms and faculty offices.
- Kershaw County Campus, located at 90 Campus Dr., Camden, SC just off of Interstate 20 and Highway 521.
- Lee County Site, located at 200 N. Main St., Bishopville, SC in Downtown Bishopville.
- Legal Studies Center, located at 111 S. Main St., Sumter, SC houses the Criminal Justice Technology and Paralegal Programs, as well as the Law Library.
- Natural Resources Management Center, located at 735 Brewington Road, Sumter, SC about 5 miles from Main Campus on a spacious 105-acre tract that includes agricultural fields, wooded and natural areas, and ponds – all of which are used for instructional purposes.
- Shaw AFB Education Center Site, located at 398 Shaw Dr., Sumter, SC on the Shaw AFB military installation within the Spratt Education Center, Building 501.
