= Orangeburg–Calhoun Technical College =

College in Orangeburg, South Carolina, U.S.

Coordinates: 33.5461152°N 80.8287826°W

Orangeburg-Calhoun Technical College
- Type: Public community college
- Established: 1968
- Parent institution: South Carolina Technical College System
- Endowment: $3.3 million
- President: Walter A. Tobin
- Students: 2,012
- Location: Orangeburg, South Carolina, United States
- Nickname: Owls
- Website: www.octech.edu

Orangeburg–Calhoun Technical College (OCtech) is a public community college in Orangeburg, South Carolina. It is part of the South Carolina Technical College System and serves Orangeburg and Calhoun counties.

== History ==
The South Carolina Technical Educational System was established in 1961 in a legislation signed by then governor Ernest F. Hollings in order to educate the citizens of South Carolina in the technical and vocational fields, an attempt to reduce the jobs lost by means of the declining resources in the agricultural and textile fields.

Ground was broken for the Orangeburg-Calhoun Technical Education Center on October 25, 1967, and it opened on September 16, 1968. During the official dedication ceremonies held on May 16, 1969, the late Senator Marshall B. Williams stated that this new education facility "represents the dreams and work of many people in the area.

On December 2, 1970, Orangeburg-Calhoun Technical Education Center Director Charles P. Weber announced that the institution had become fully accredited by the Commission on Colleges of the Southern Association of Colleges and Schools (SACS). This, along with a recommendation by the Orangeburg-Calhoun Area Technical Education Commission and approved by the State Board for Technical and Comprehensive Education, incited a name change in May 1974 to Orangeburg–Calhoun Technical College. This more accurately reflected the college's post-secondary education mission. The name of director was also changed to president at this time.

The original campus was 84,232 square feet (7,825.4 m^{2}) of classrooms, labs and administrative offices. An expansion in 1978 added new buildings housing administrative offices, student personnel services and a learning resource center: the Gressette Learning Resource Center, named in honor of Senator L. Marion Gressette of St. Matthews, and the Williams Administration Building in honor of Senator Marshall B. Williams of Orangeburg.

In 1988, the 20th anniversary celebration marked the opening of the 32,430-square-foot (3,013 m^{2}), $3.3 million Health Sciences building. In January 1993, the Industrial/Technology, Business/Computer Technology and Faculty Administration buildings were named in honor of Joe K. Fairey II (the Fairey family owns the St. Matthews Chevrolet dealership since 1926, which is now located across the street on the other side of US 601), John O. Wesner, Jr. and Ben R. Wetenhall, respectively.

In 2003, the Student Life and Community Center was completed as the new cornerstone of the college. The 37,000-square-foot (3,400 m^{2}), $5.2 million facility is the home for Student Services, Career Training and Development, Planning, Development and Research offices, and the president's office. This building also features a Cyber Cafe, The Tourville Learning Lab, and meeting rooms, all of which are open to the public.

The Gressette building was recently renovated and is the new home of the library, student lounge, campus bookstore and various offices.

In 2010, the Anne S. Crook Transportation and Logistics was completed.
