= Williamsburg Technical College =

College in Kingstree, South Carolina, U.S.

- Type: Public community college
- Parent institution: South Carolina Technical College System
- President: Patty Lee
- Location: Kingstree, South Carolina, South Carolina, United States; 33°40′16″N 79°49′43″W
- Nickname: Brewers
- Website: www.wiltech.edu

Williamsburg Technical College is a public community college in Kingstree, South Carolina. It is a part of the South Carolina Technical College System.
