= Trident Technical College =

College in Charleston, South Carolina, U.S.

Coordinates: 32.928528°N 80.0297389°W

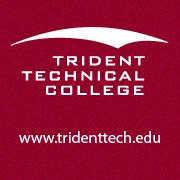

Trident Technical College (TTC) is a public community college with its main campus in Charleston, South Carolina and other campuses throughout Berkeley, Charleston, and Dorchester counties. It is part of the South Carolina Technical College System. Enrollment for each semester is approximately 12,000 students working their way toward college transfer associate degrees and technical associate degrees, diplomas, and certificates.

== History ==
Trident Technical College was formed in 1973 from the merger of the Berkeley-Charleston-Dorchester Technical Education Center and Palmer College.

== Locations ==
- Thornley Campus - 7000 Rivers Ave., North Charleston, SC 29406
- Mount Pleasant Campus - 1125 John Dilligard Lane, Mount Pleasant, SC 29464
- Palmer Campus - 66 Columbus St., Charleston, SC 29403
- Berkeley Campus - 1001 S. Live Oak Drive, Moncks Corner, SC 29461
- St. Paul's Parish Site - 5231 Highway 165, Hollywood, SC 29449
- Dorchester Campus - 10055 Dorchester Rd., Summerville, SC 29485
- Dorchester County QuickJobs Training Center - 5164 E. Jim Bilton Boulevard, St. George, SC 29477
