= Horry-Georgetown Technical College =

College in Conway, South Carolina, U.S.

- Type: Public community college
- Established: 1966 (60 years ago)
- Parent institution: South Carolina Technical College System
- President: Marilyn Murphy Fore
- Students: 8,137
- Location: Conway, South Carolina, United States
- Colors: Blue and Green
- Nickname: Gators
- Mascot: Chomp the Gator
- Website: www.hgtc.edu/

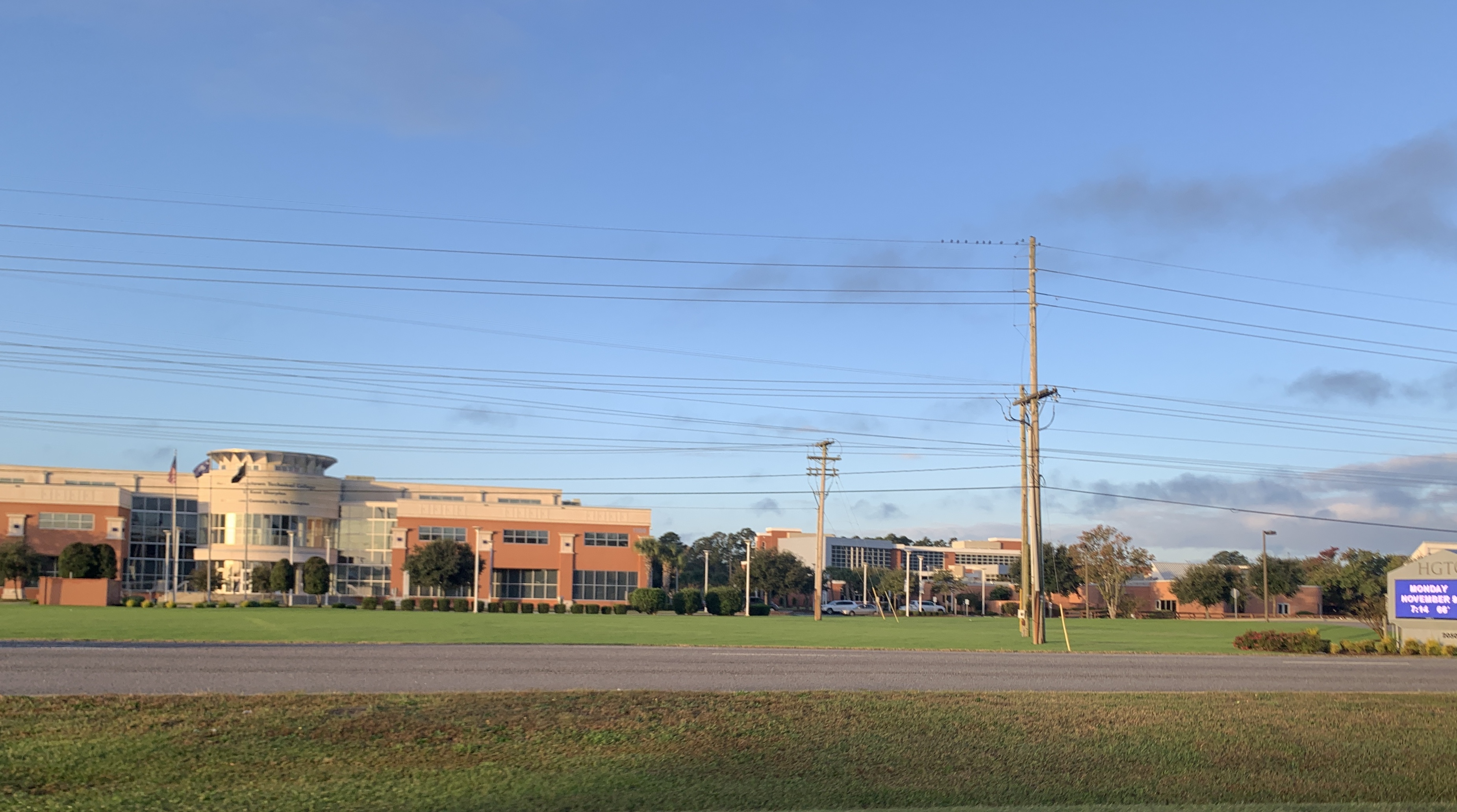

Horry-Georgetown Technical College (HGTC) is a public technical college in Conway, South Carolina. It is a part of the South Carolina Technical College System.

HGTC is the fourth largest technical college in the state, and offers over 65 degree and certificate programs in Golf & Sports Turf Technology, Arts & Science, Business, Engineering & Industrial Technology, Health Science, Information/Computer Technology, and Public Service Technology. Tourism programs that have been added help the local economy. 90 percent of graduates stay in the area.

HGTC currently has three campuses. In addition to the main campus on U.S. 501 next to Coastal Carolina University in Conway (33.7964°N 79.0033°W), the school has campuses in Myrtle Beach (33.6591°N 78.9416°W) and Georgetown (33.3205°N 79.3213°W). Students can also take classes online. The Conway campus has 13 buildings on 50 acres (20.2 ha).

The Grand Strand Campus Conference and Business Center near The Market Common has meeting space that includes the Thomas C. Maeser Auditorium, a 3,650-square-foot (339 m^{2}) ballroom.

== History ==
In 1961, the Technical Education System in South Carolina began. In 1963, the South Carolina General Assembly created the Horry-Georgetown Commission for Technical Education. Horry-Marion-Georgetown Technical Education Center began with 123 students in 1966. In 1975, the name changed to Horry-Georgetown Technical College as a result of growth and changed emphasis. Horry-Georgetown Technical College now serves Horry and Georgetown Counties, while Marion County is served by Florence-Darlington Technical College.

In 2000, as buildings were torn down at the former Myrtle Beach Air Force Base, HGTC claimed the Officers Club and Non-Commissioned Officers Club.

The former base hospital became the Dr. Robert E. Speir Jr. Health Education Center on the Myrtle Beach campus, which held its grand opening July 11, 2008. In 2009, HGTC announced the center would get a 20,000-square-foot (1,900 m^{2}) addition for dental programs. The $7.4 million facility was substantially complete when Myrtle Beach City Council toured it May 8, 2012.

On June 15, 2012, the dedication of the Fred Fore Wildlife Pavilion was held at the Georgetown campus. Fore served as president of Florence-Darlington Technical College for 29 years, and his wife Marilyn Fore, the current HGTC President, worked to develop the pavilion as a forestry classroom.
