= Tri-County Technical College =

College in Pendleton, South Carolina, U.S.

- Type: Public community college
- Established: 1962; 64 years ago
- Parent institution: South Carolina Technical College System
- Endowment: $42.1 million (2025)
- President: Galen DeHay
- Faculty: 348
- Undergraduates: 5,629
- Location: Pendleton, South Carolina, United States; 34°38′32″N 82°47′31″W
- Campus: Rural
- Website: www.tctc.edu

Tri-County Technical College is a public community college in Pendleton, South Carolina. It is part of the South Carolina Technical College System. Established in 1962, Tri-County Technical College has four campuses in Pendleton, Anderson, Easley, and Seneca, serving Anderson, Oconee, and Pickens counties. The college has a partnership with nearby Clemson University to allow students who plan to declare a limited enrollment major or missing college-level credits at Clemson to enroll at Tri-County and transfer to Clemson after two semesters whilst holding status as Clemson Students.
