= Midlands Technical College =

Public college in South Carolina, US

Coordinates: 33.988°N 80.98°W

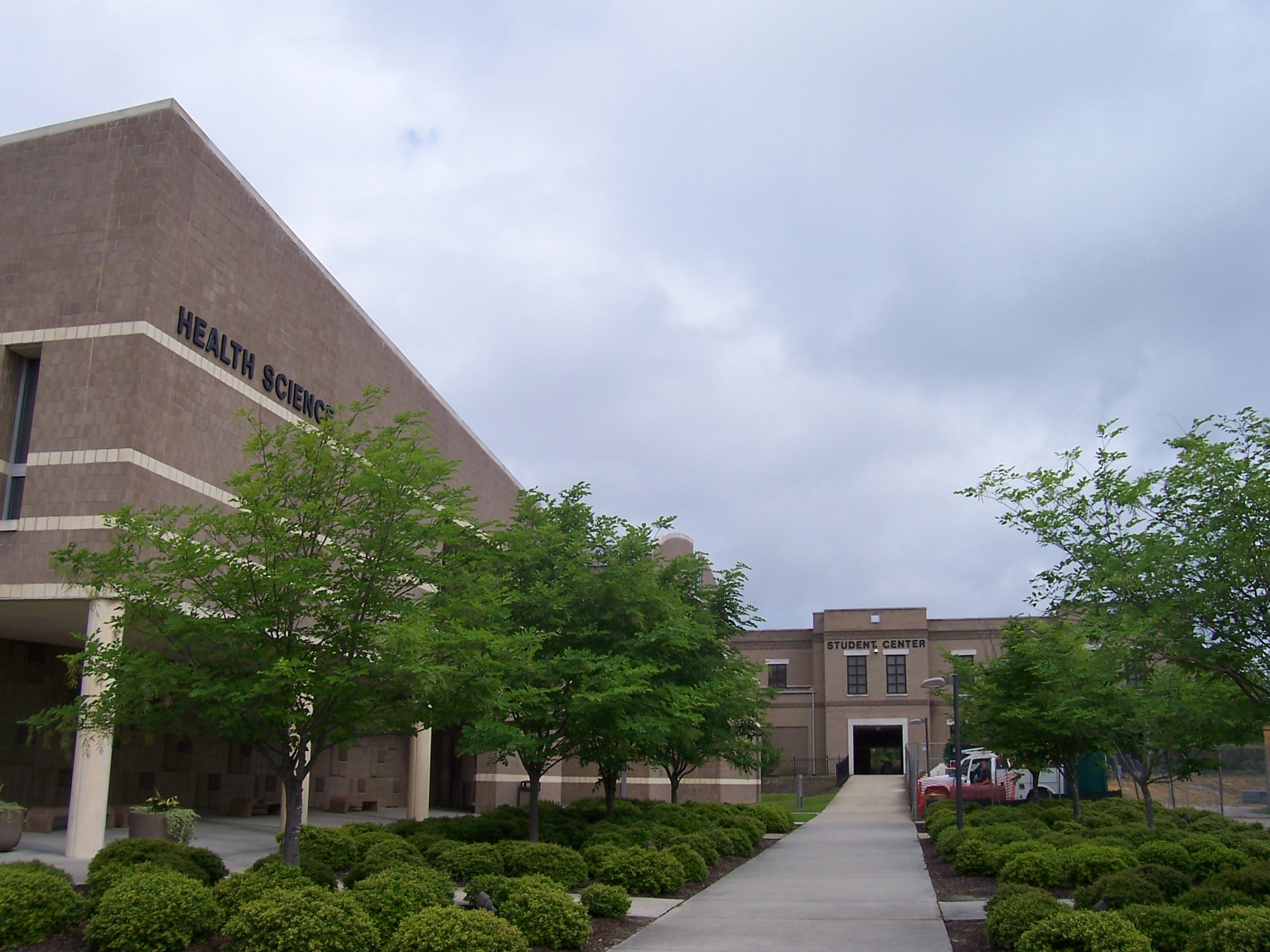
- Airport campus of Midlands Technical College
- Former names: South Carolina Area Trade School Columbia Campus; Columbia Technical Education Center; Richland Technical Education Center
- Motto: You can get anywhere from here
- Type: Public community college
- Established: 1947
- Parent institution: South Carolina Technical College System
- Accreditation: Southern Association of Colleges and Schools Commission on Colleges
- Endowment: $17 million (2024)
- President: Gregory D. Little
- Provost: Barrie Kirk
- Students: 22,500+
- Location: Columbia, South Carolina, United States
- Campus: Suburb: Large
- Colors: Blue and Gold
- Mascot: Mavericks
- Website: www.midlandstech.edu

Midlands Technical College is a public technical college with locations in the Richland, Lexington, and Fairfield counties of South Carolina. Midlands Technical College is the second largest technical college in the state with approximately 22,500 students.

== History ==
In 1947, the South Carolina Area Trade Schools (SCATS) Act established the South Carolina Area Trade School Columbia Campus to provide skilled and educated workers to meet the expanding labor needs of the community. In 1969, the school's name was changed to Columbia Technical Education Center (TEC), and it became part of the State Committee for Technical Education, which was responsible for guiding the state's technical programs. The site of the Columbia Technical Education Center is now the Airport Campus of Midlands Technical College.

Richland Technical Education Center (Richland TEC) was established to provide specialized training for industrial growth, and the first students were enrolled in the fall of 1963. In 1969, the school enrolled 1,200 students, and Lexington County officials joined Richland County to form the Richland-Lexington Counties Commission for Technical Education. This partnership lead to the college changing its name to Midlands Technical Education Center (TEC).

Approximately 15,500 students were enrolled in Midlands Technical Education Center between the years 1969 and 1974. Major programs of study were offered in engineering technologies, business, and allied health. The site of the Midlands Technical Education Center is now the Beltline Campus of Midlands Technical College.

Palmer College in Columbia, a private business college, joined the State Tech Board in 1973. At that time, Palmer College annually enrolled 1,000 students in 16 associate degree and diploma programs. On March 21, 1973, the Columbia Technical Education Center, Midlands Technical Education Center, and Palmer College in Columbia merged to form a single, multi-campus college. This new college operated as three separate entities governed by one local commission through June 1974. On July 1 of that year, the three separate institutions merged to form Midlands Technical College under the guidance of the Richland-Lexington Counties Commission for Technical Education.

== Campuses ==
Midlands Technical College has six campuses:

- Airport Campus, located at 1260 Lexington Dr., West Columbia, SC, covers 65 acres (26.3 ha), consisting of 15 buildings
- Beltline Campus, located at 316 South Beltline Blvd. Columbia, SC, consists of 12 buildings. It is currently the only campus where both industrial and engineering technology classes are offered.
- Fairfield Campus, located at 1674 Hwy 321 North Business, Winnsboro, SC.

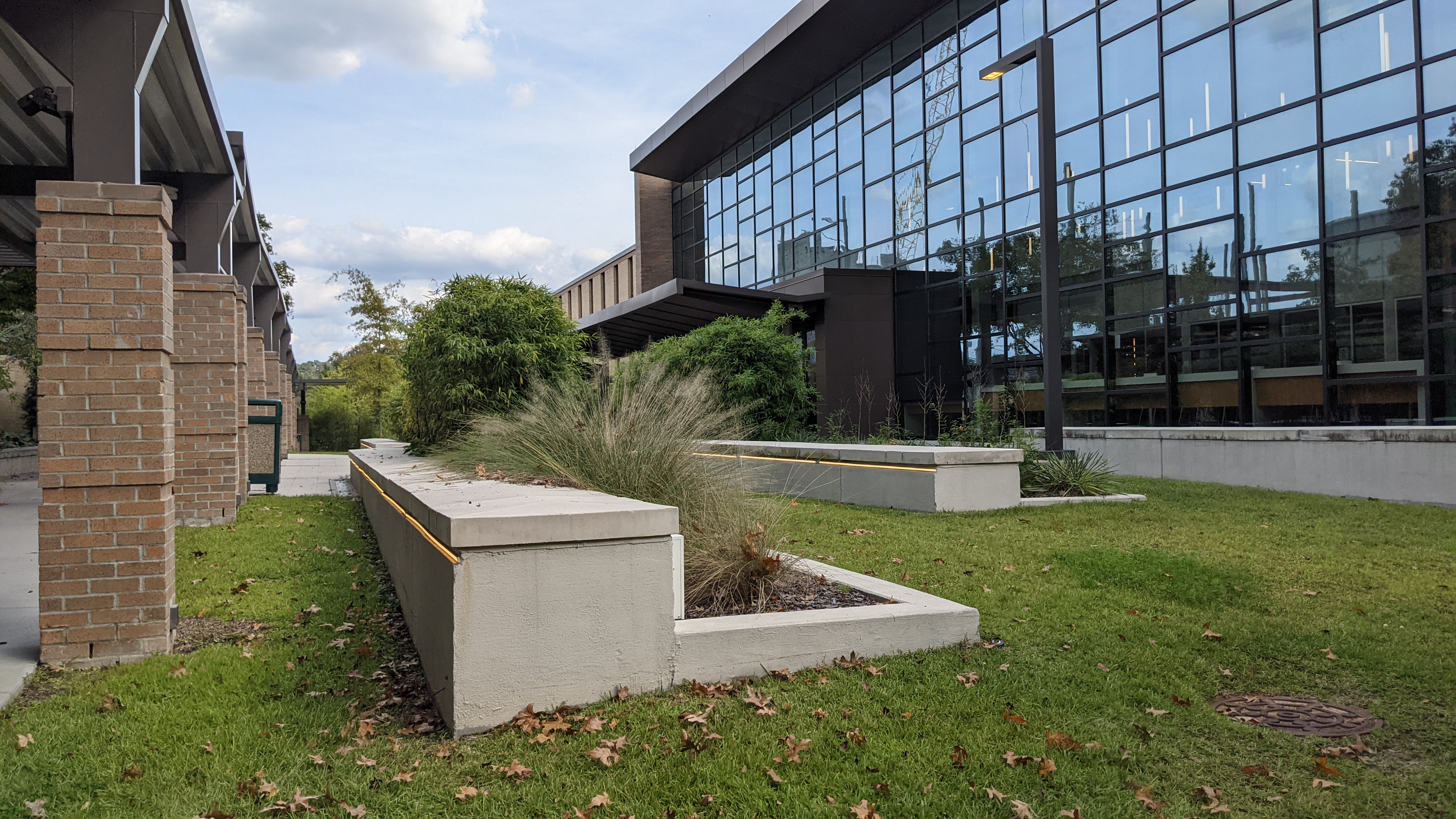
Outside view of the library building at Beltline

- Harbison Campus, located at 7300 College St., Irmo, SC, has seven buildings including the Harbison Theatre, the only performing arts center belonging to a technical and community college in South Carolina.
- Northeast Campus is the site of MTC's Enterprise Campus and the MTC Center of Excellence for Technology. The campus covers 100 acres (40.5 ha) of land adjacent to the MTC Center of Excellence for Technology, near the Carolina Research Park and shared technology-specific spaces.
- Batesburg-Leesville Campus offers general education courses and the college has a partnership with Voorhes University for an elementary education bridge program.
- Lexington North Lake is a learning center located in Lexington County. The center offers general education courses, information technology, health care, and emergency medicine.
- An additional center is located on the Fort Jackson military base, which offers classes primarily for service personnel.
