= York Technical College =

College in Rock Hill, South Carolina, U.S.

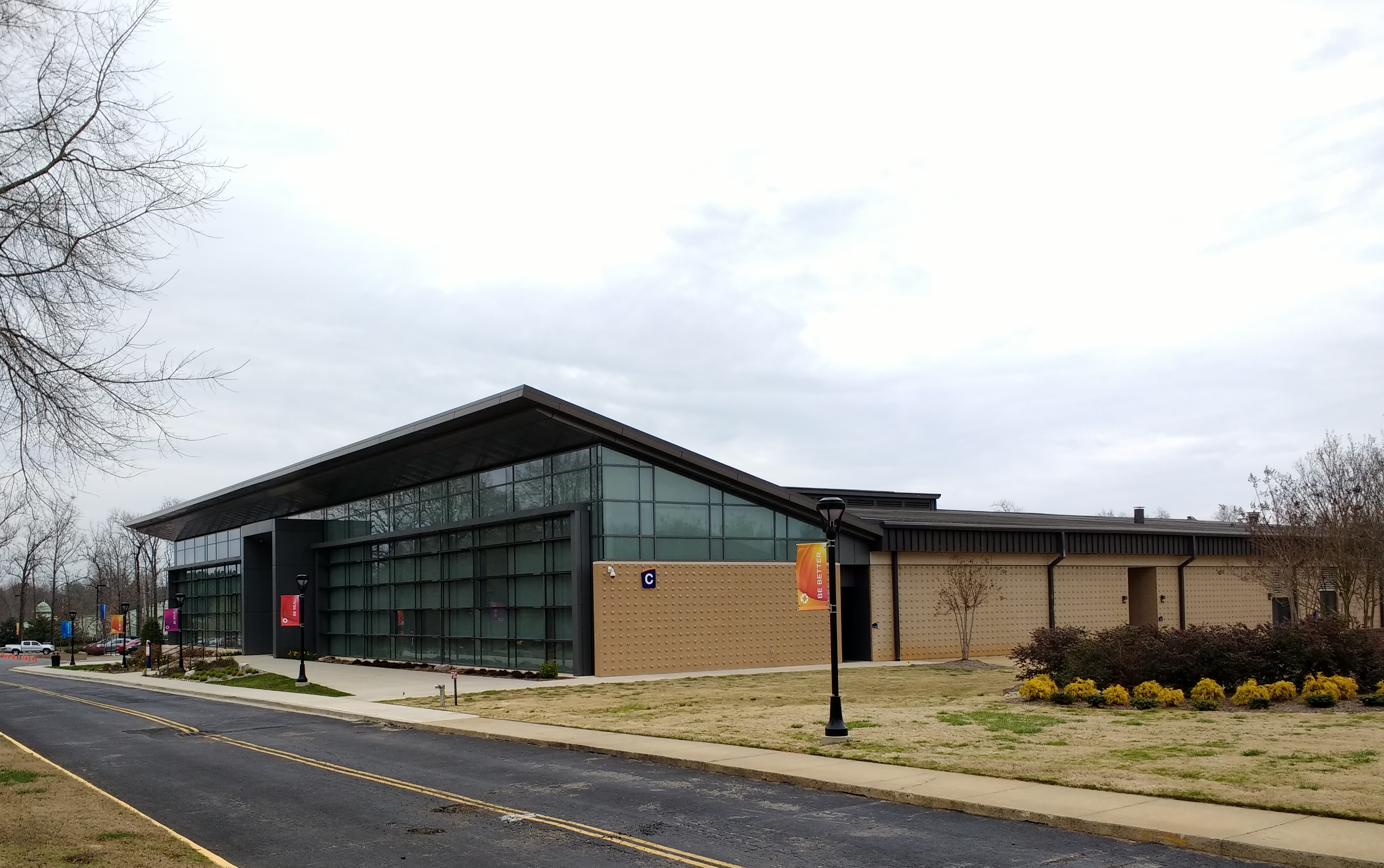
- Type: Public community college
- Established: 1964
- Parent institution: South Carolina Technical College System
- President: Stacey J. Moore
- Students: 4,521 (Fall 2022)
- Location: Rock Hill, South Carolina, United States; 34.934928°N 80.994657°W
- Colors: Blue and Orange Gold
- Website: www.yorktech.edu

York Technical College (York Tech) is a public community college in Rock Hill, South Carolina. It is part of the South Carolina Technical College System and one of three colleges in the city of Rock Hill. York Tech was established in 1964 and presently serves York, Chester, and Lancaster counties.
