= Aiken Technical College =

College in Graniteville, South Carolina, U.S.

- Former name: Aiken Technical Education Center
- Motto: Uniquely Powerful
- Type: Public community college
- Established: 1972; 54 years ago
- Parent institution: South Carolina Technical College System
- President: Forest E. Mahan
- Academic staff: 115
- Administrative staff: 170
- Students: 2,121
- Location: Graniteville, South Carolina, U.S. 33.534384°N 81.842759°W
- Campus: Suburban, 104 acres (42.1 ha)
- Nickname: Knights
- Website: www.atc.edu

Aiken Technical College (ATC) is a public community college in Graniteville, South Carolina. It is part of the South Carolina Technical College System. More than 3,400 students enroll in credit courses annually and 10,000 people enroll in non-credit courses and programs.

The institution was established in 1972 as Aiken Technical Education Center. In 1978, it was renamed to Aiken Technical College.

== History ==
The campus was constructed in 1973, a year after the college's establishment, and originally consisted of three buildings.

In 2000, the Dale Phelon Information Technology building opened for classes as well as providing the college's library and additional office spaces.

In 2001, the Manufacturing and Technology Training Center opened.

In 2003, the Health and Science building opened.

In 2014, construction for the Center for Energy and Advanced Manufacturing building began, followed by a dedication ceremony held in 2015.

In 2023, construction began on a new Aiken County Career and Technology Center situated on the campus. The facility is intended to replace the original center, which was constructed in the 1960s near the campus entrance along Jefferson Davis Highway. Developed in partnership with Aiken County Public School District, the new center is designed to provide educational opportunities for local high school students by providing training in fields such as cybersecurity, advanced manufacturing, and healthcare.

In the same year, Aiken Technical College and the University of South Carolina Aiken established a collaborative transfer agreement, allowing students to complete an associate degree at Aiken Tech and transition to USCA to pursue a bachelor’s degree.

In 2025, Aiken Technical College began construction on a new Nursing Education Center, a facility intended to support the expansion of its nursing programs through the addition of advanced laboratories, simulation areas, and auditorium spaces.

== Academics ==
The college is accredited by the Southern Association of Colleges and Schools. In addition, several of its programs earned accreditation from nationally recognized organizations.

- School of General Education
  - Early Care: accredited by the National Association for the Education of Young Children.
- School of Health Sciences
  - Emergency Medical: Accredited by the Commission on Allied Health Education Programs (CAAHEP) and Committee on Accreditation for Emergency Medical Services Professions.
  - Dental Assisting: Accredited by the American Dental Association and Commission on Dental Accreditation.
  - Medical Assisting: Accredited by the Medical Assisting Education Review Board (MAERB) as well as CAAHEP.
  - Pharmacy Technician: Accredited by the Accreditation Council for Pharmacy Education.
  - Radiologic Technology: Accredited by the Joint Review Committee on Education in Radiologic Technology.
  - Surgical Technology: Accredited by the Accreditation Review Council on Education in Surgical Technology and Surgical Assisting as well as CAAHEP.
- School of Nursing
  - Nursing: Accredited by the Accreditation Commission for Education in Nursing.
- School of Technical and Continuing Education
  - Accounting and Management: Both programs are accredited by the Accreditation Council for Business Schools and Programs (ACBSP).

== Athletics ==
Aiken Technical College launched the Knights men's basketball program in 1991, followed by the Lady Knights women's softball program in 2006. Both athletic programs were discontinued in 2013, with college administration citing shifting resources and focus on student outreach and development.
