= Florence–Darlington Technical College =

Community college in Florence, South Carolina, US

Florence-Darlington Technical College
- Type: Public community college
- Established: 1963; 63 years ago
- Parent institution: South Carolina Technical College System
- President: Debbie Cheek
- Students: 4,000
- Location: Florence, South Carolina, U.S. 34°14′32″N 79°48′46″W
- Colors: Blue and gold
- Nickname: Stingers
- Website: www.fdtc.edu

Florence–Darlington Technical College is a public community college in Florence, South Carolina. It is a part of the South Carolina Technical College System and accredited by the Southern Association of Colleges and Schools Commission on Colleges .

The Florence-Darlington Technical Education Center was established in 1963 and serves Florence, Darlington, and Marion counties.

The college operates sites in Hartsville, Lake City, Mullins, and a health sciences complex in downtown Florence.
