= Morale, Welfare and Recreation =

US military services and recreation program

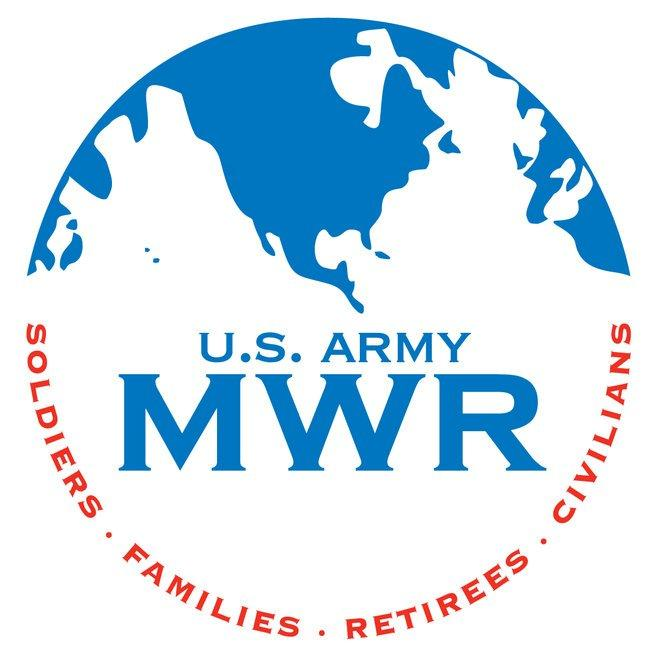
Army MWR Logo

Morale, Welfare and Recreation (MWR) is a network of support and leisure services designed for use by U.S. servicemembers (Active, Reserve, and Guard), their families, military retirees, veterans with 100 percent service-connected disability, current and retired DoD civilian employees, and other eligible participants.

== Organization ==
Each branch of the United States Armed Forces has a branch of MWR. MWR provides free and discounted recreation to military personnel and their families. Although the facilities provided vary from base to base, the types of services, facilities, and programs provided can include fitness centers, pools, marinas, bowling centers, golf courses, restaurants, conference centers, catering, programs for single sailors with special events, access to the internet, movies and video games. Army MWR also offers accredited family child care and youth and school-aged services at many installations.

=== Army and Air Force ===
The Army and Air Force's MWR services are paid for via the Army and Air Force Exchange Service. Roughly 70% of Army and Air Force Exchange Service earnings are paid to MWR programs. In the last ten years, more than $2.24 billion has been contributed by the Exchange to the Army and Air Force to spend on quality-of-life improvements for Soldiers, Airmen, and their families.

==== Army ====
The United States Army’s MWR is run by the G9, Family and MWR Directorate of the U.S. Army Installation Management Command.

The United States Army's Family and MWR Programs is a military organization whose primary mission is to provide the United States Army with programs that fulfill and support the Army Family Covenant. The organization strives to provide soldiers and their families with "the same quality of life afforded the society they protect."

==== Air Force ====
The United States Air Force’s Outdoor Rec agency is the Air Force Services Activity.

=== Marines ===
The United States Marines’ MWR program is the Marine Corps Community Services.

=== Navy ===
The United States Navy's MWR program is run by the Navy Installations Command.

Navy MWR is in most areas where there are Navy personnel stationed in the United States, internationally, and in the fleet. Many of their programs are operated by "non-appropriated funds", or by the proceeds that they earn rather than by tax dollars.

=== Coast Guard ===
United States Coast Guard MWR.
