= Reuben D. Jones =

American Army major general

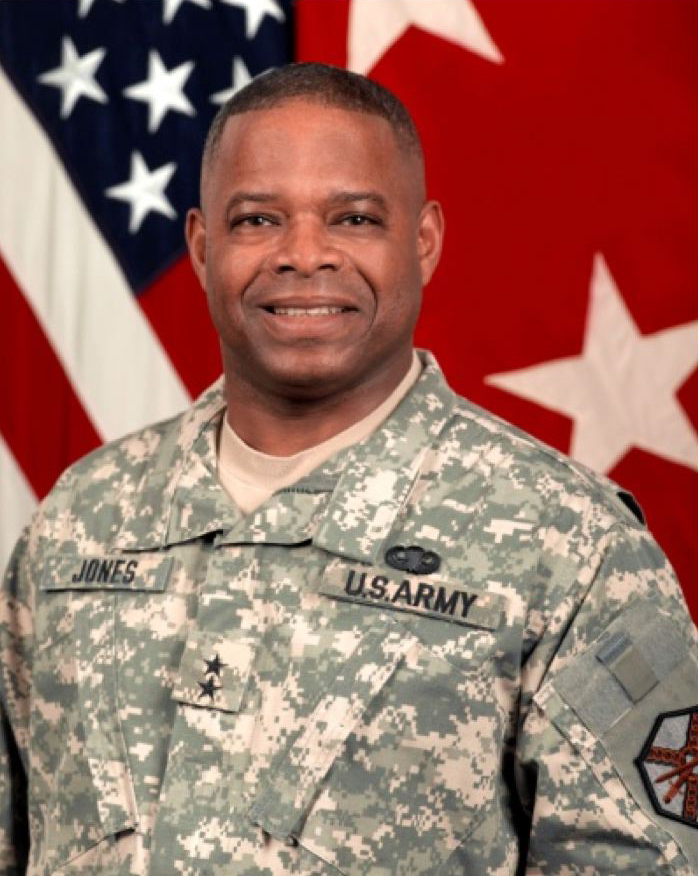
- Major General Reuben D. Jones
- Born: West Point, Mississippi, United States
- Military career
- Allegiance: United States
- Branch: United States Army
- Rank: Major General
- Awards: Distinguished Service Medal; Legion of Merit; Defense Meritorious Service Medal

Reuben D. Jones is a retired United States Army major general. In his final assignment, he served as the deputy commanding general of operations for the Installation Management Command from June 3, 2011, to December 3, 2012.

Previously, Major General Jones served as the Commanding General, Family and Morale, Welfare and Recreation Command from July 30, 2009, until the command was deactivated on June 3, 2011. Major General Jones has also served as Adjutant General of the U.S. Army; Commanding General, U.S. Army Physical Disability Agency and executive director, Military Postal Service Agency in Alexandria, Virginia.

== Early life and education ==
Major General Jones was born in West Point, Mississippi, and in 1974 graduated from Provine High School in Jackson, Mississippi. He is a 1978 graduate of Jackson State University with a Bachelor of Arts degree in Sociology. Major General Jones was commissioned through the Army ROTC program at Jackson State University. He also holds a Master of Strategic Studies Degree from the U.S. Army War College and a Master of Arts Degree in Administration from Central Michigan University. His military education includes the Adjutant General Basic Officer Course, the Adjutant General Officer Advanced Course, the Airborne School, the Military Personnel Officer Course, the Combined Arms Services Staff School, the Command and General Staff College, and the Army Senior Service College.

== Military career ==
Early in his career, Major General Jones was a Receiving Officer; Chief, Personnel Actions Branch and Commander, Reception Station at Fort Jackson, South Carolina. From November 1980 to February 1982, he served in Germany as the Equal Opportunity Officer, U.S. Army Military Community Activity, and as Chief, Administrative Support Division, 200th Theater Logistics Material Management Center, Zweibrücken, Germany. In June 1984, Major General Jones assumed duties as Instructor and Doctrinal Author, U.S. Army Soldier Support Center, Fort Benjamin Harrison, Indiana. From July 1987 to June 1991, while in Korea, he served as Chief, Force Structure, 8th Personnel Command; Commander, 199th Personnel Services Company, Camp Coiner; and Deputy G-1, 2d Infantry Division, Camp Casey. He returned to the United States in July 1992, and served as Chief, Analysis Section and then as Personnel Management Officer, U.S. Total Army Personnel Command, Alexandria, Virginia. Major General Jones joined the Office of the Army Chief of Staff as an Assistant to the Director Army Staff in July 1994 where he served until assuming command of the Military Entrance Processing Station, Baltimore, Maryland. In July 2000, he became Deputy Commander, 8th Personnel Command, Camp Coiner, Korea. Upon his return to the United States in August 2001, he became Director, Army Development System, Force XXI, at the U.S. Total Army Personnel Command, Alexandria, Virginia. In July 2002, he assumed command of the U.S. Army Enlisted Records and Evaluation Center in Indianapolis, Indiana. He returned to the Washington, D.C., area in August 2004, where he assumed duties as the deputy director, Military Personnel Policy, Deputy Chief of Staff, G-1. Major General Jones assumed duties as the Executive Officer, Deputy Chief of Staff, G-1, in July 2005 to June 2006. Major General Jones then held the positions of The Adjutant General of the U.S. Army; Commanding General, U.S. Army Physical Disability Agency and executive director, Military Postal Service Agency, prior to assuming command of the Family and Morale, Welfare and Recreation Command in July 2009.

He was promoted to the rank of major general on January 6, 2010.

In June 2011, he became the deputy commanding general of operations for the Installation Management Command. and retired December 3, 2012.

== Decorations and badges ==
Jones has been awarded the following:

U.S. military decorations
Army Distinguished Service Medal
Legion of Merit
Defense Meritorious Service Medal
Meritorious Service Medal (with 4 bronze oak leaf clusters)
Army Commendation Medal (with 3 bronze oak leaf clusters)
Army Achievement Medal
U.S. service (campaign) medals and service and training ribbons
National Defense Service Medal (with 1 service star)
Global War on Terrorism Service Medal
Korean Defense Service Medal
Army Service Ribbon
Army Overseas Service Ribbon (with award numeral "3")
