= United States Army's Family and MWR Programs =

Family and MWR Programs
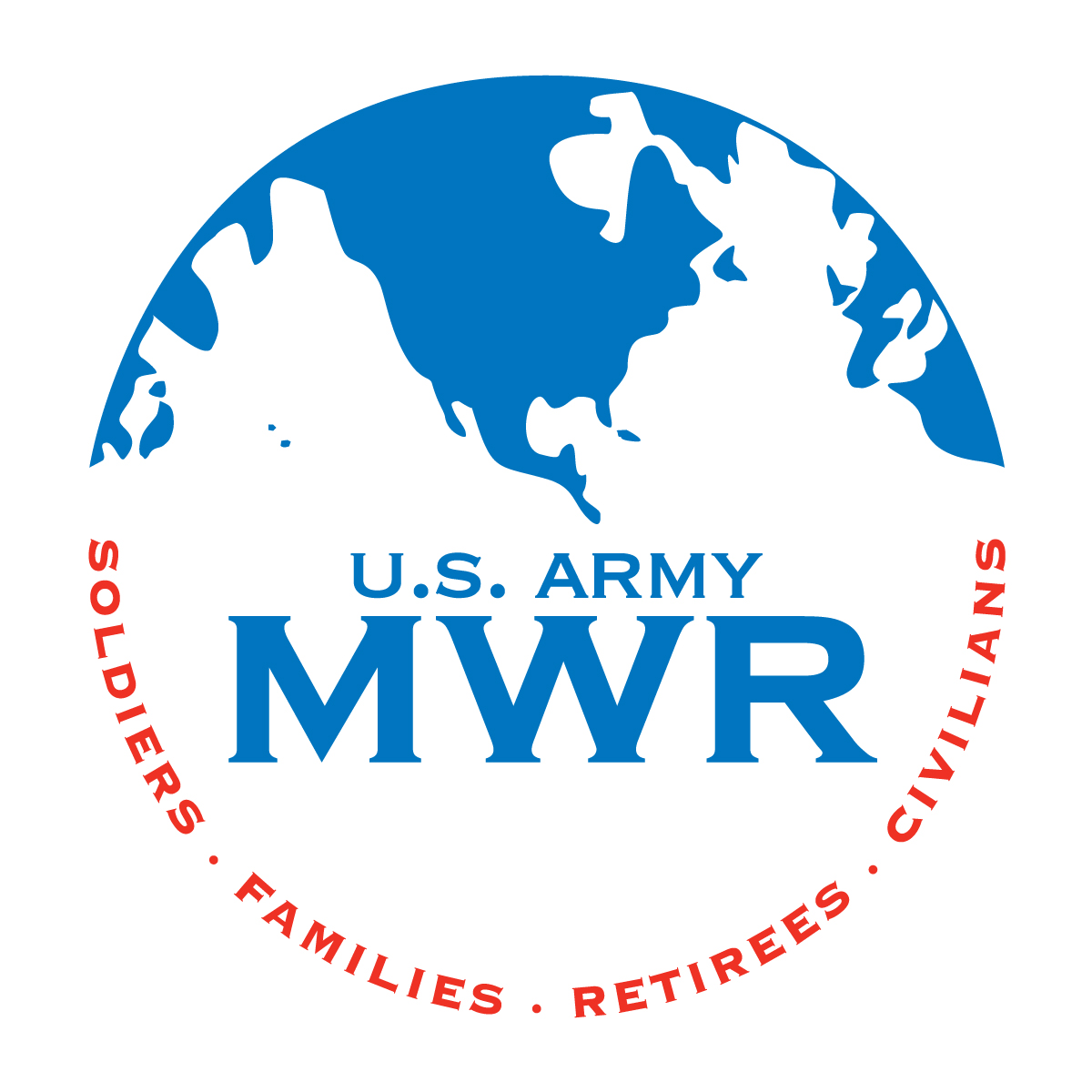
- Soldiers, Families, Retirees, Civilians
- Active: 2011 – present
- Country: United States of America
- Allegiance: United States
- Branch: United States Army
- Part of: Department of Defense Department of the Army Installation Management Command
- Nickname: MWR
- Website: Official MWR News

The United States Army's Family and Morale, Welfare and Recreation (MWR) Programs are executed within the Installation Management Command G9, Family and MWR Directorate, following the deactivation of the Family and Morale, Welfare and Recreation Command on 3 June 2011 in a ceremony at Fort Sam Houston. According to the organization's official mission statement, IMCOM G9 delivers "quality Family and Morale, Welfare, and Recreation programs and services supporting the readiness and resilience of the All-Volunteer Army."

According to U.S. Army Regulation 215-1, Army MWR is a quality-of-life program that directly supports readiness by providing a variety of community, soldier, and family support programs, activities and services. Included in MWR are social, fitness, recreational, educational, and other programs and activities that enhance community life, foster soldier and unit readiness, promote mental and physical fitness, and generally provide a working and living environment that attracts and retains quality for U.S. Army soldiers, family members, retirees and its civilian workforce.

The range of MWR programs offered at Army Garrison's is based on the needs of authorized patrons who work and reside there. Programs are managed by garrison commanders within the framework of authorized and available appropriated and non-appropriated funds. Non-appropriated funds are those funds that are locally generated by MWR programs or provided by Installation Management Command (IMCOM) region directors and/or the Family and MWR Programs. AAFES dividends are also a source of non-appropriated funding.

Each MWR program is classified by category. Categories are determined by their effect on the military mission and their ability to generate revenue.

== Objectives ==
Family and MWR supports combat readiness and effectiveness; supports recruitment and retention of quality personnel; provides leisure time activities, which support a quality of life commensurate with generally accepted American values; promotes and maintains the mental and physical wellbeing of authorized personnel; fosters community pride, soldier morale, and family wellness and promotes unit esprit de corps, eases the impact of unique aspects of military life, such as frequent relocations and deployment.

== History ==
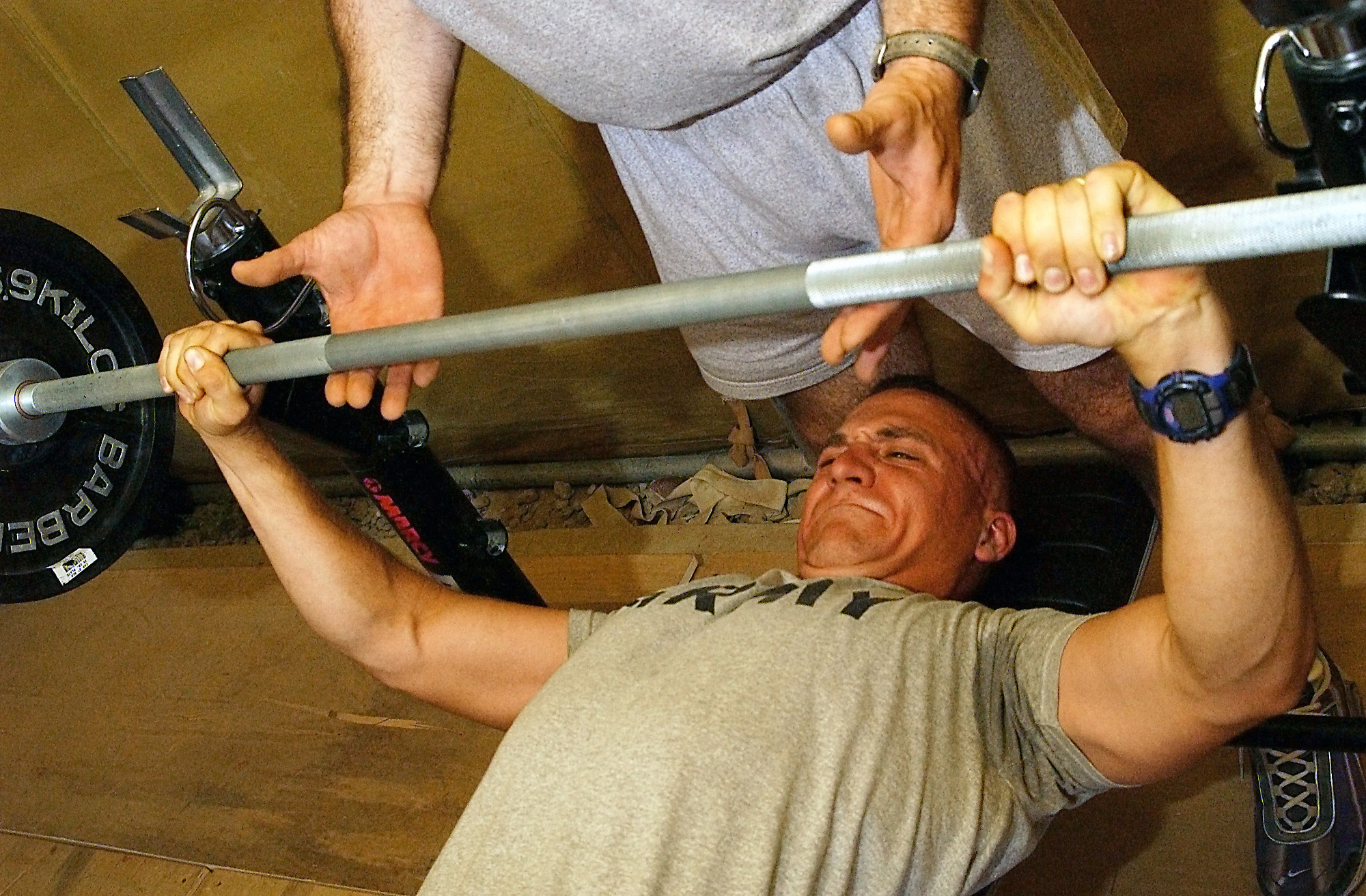
U.S. Army Specialist (SPC) Brian Buss, 3rd Battalion, 187th Infantry, performs incline bench presses, with a spotter, at the gym tent provided by the Morale Welfare Recreation (MWR) staff on Kandahar Air Base, Afghanistan, during Operation Enduring Freedom.

Although the United States Army was founded in 1775, Morale, welfare, and recreation programs did not exist for the Army until the start of the twentieth century.

Before that time, troop support came informally in the form of tradesmen and trading posts. The goods they were able to provide included meals, clothing, and laundering.

The formalization of MWR services began with limited Congressional oversight established in 1876 over "Post Traders" and then the establishment of Army "PX" or The Post Exchange, by Headquarters, Department of the Army (HQDA) in 1895, with War Department General Order No. 46, 1895. Profits from the Post Exchange were used to support recreational activities for the troops.

In 1903, the United States Congress passed the 1903 Army Appropriations Act, which provided funds to build, operate and maintain PXs, libraries, schools, recreation centers, and gyms for the troops.

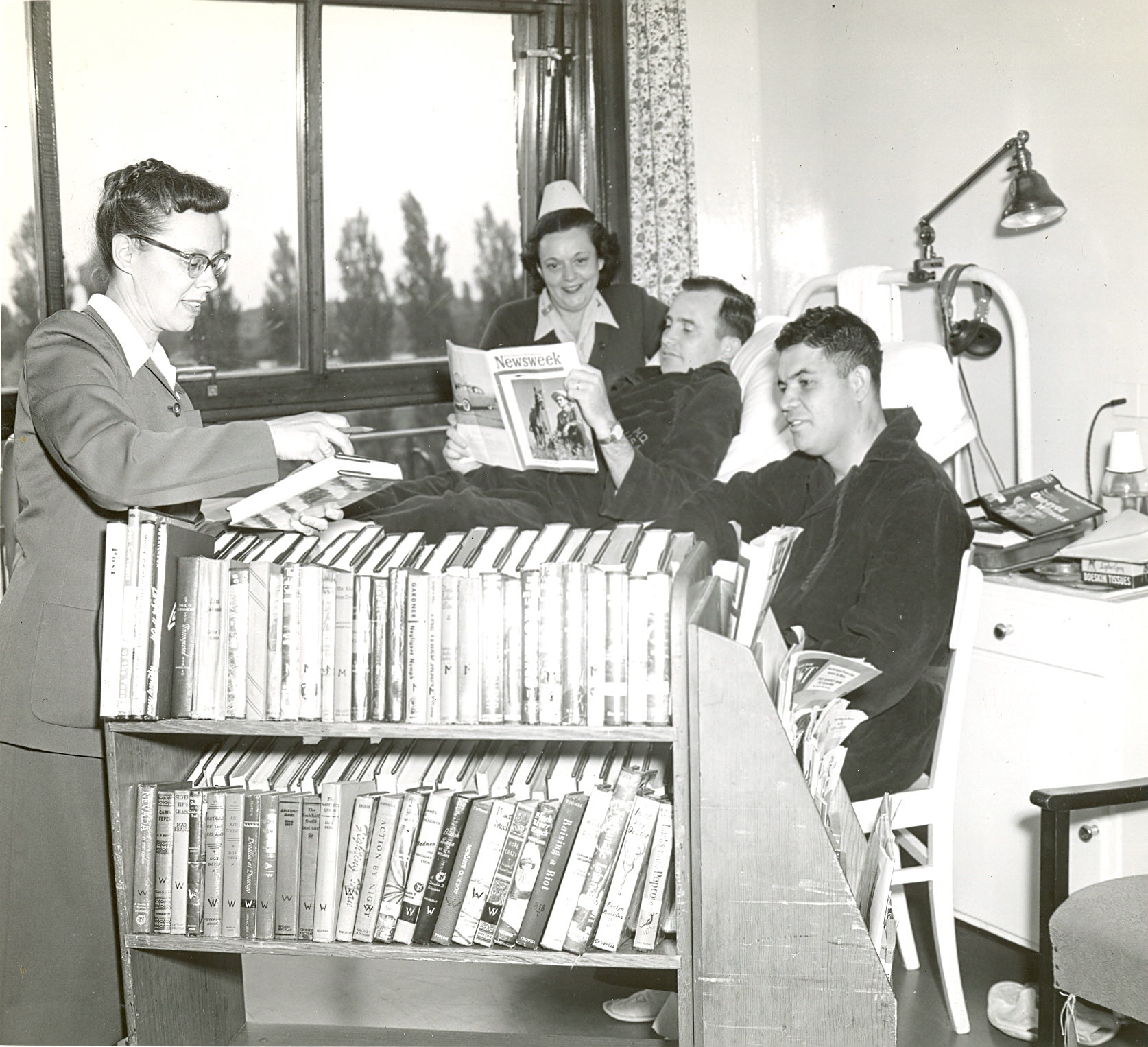
A 1951 image from Hospital Library Ward Service. U.S. Army Photo.

The Army Morale Division was established in 1918, followed by the Army Motion Picture Service in 1920 and the Library Service in 1923. In 1941, the Army Morale Division and these other organizations collectively became "Special Services."

By 1943, Special Services had grown to include all of Army Recreation Services, the Army Exchange (the precursor to the Army and Air Force Exchange [AAFES]), and the Army Soldier Show. Special Services soon established the first Armed Forces Recreation Center (AFRC) in Bavaria (FMWR currently manages five AFRCs) and, by 1950, Special Services was placed under the Army Adjutant General's Office during an Army reorganization.

Services for families, rather than just troops, began to emerge in the mid to late 1960s. In 1965, Army Community Services was created, followed in 1968 by a Youth Activities Program and, in 1971, an Outdoor Recreation Program.

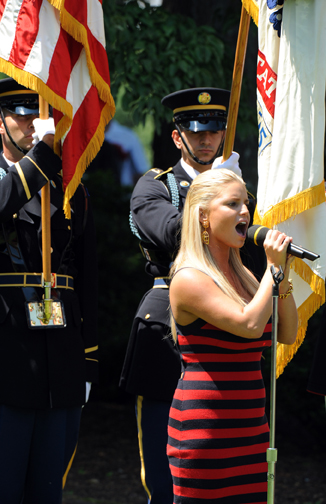
Jessica Simpson sings "The Star-Spangled Banner" during the opening ceremony of the AT&T National PGA Tour event 1 July at Congressional Country Club in Bethesda

Emphasis on the family continued in 1981 with the first Family Advocacy Program and the first Army Family Symposium.

With the publication in 1983 of Army Chief of Staff General John A. Wickham Jr's White Paper, the Army Family, the integral support role of Soldiers' families was acknowledged. The development of Gen. Wickham's White Paper led to initiatives such as the Army Family Action Plan (AFAP), Family Readiness Groups and Army Family Team Building.

On 23 November 1984, the U.S. Army Community and Family Support Center (CFSC) was formed under General Order Number 40, as a Field Operating Agency.

In 1993, oversight of CSFC changed from the Office of the Deputy Chief of Staff for Personnel (DCSPER), to the Office of the Assistant Chief of Staff for Installation Management (ACSIM) and the organization itself changed from a Field Operating Agency to a Direct Reporting Unit on 24 October 2006 when Installation Management Command (IMCOM) was activated and the Installation Management Agency (IMA) was deactivated. With the activation of IMCOM, CFSC became the Family and Morale, Welfare and Recreation Command (FMWRC) on 24 October 2006. Since 1996, ArmyMWR.com has been the website serving Soldiers and their Families at Garrisons and Installations in the United States and throughout the world.

The Family and MWR Command revised and published a new brand logo in 2010.

On 26 May 2011, the command retired its flag in Alexandria, Va., to prepare for a move to San Antonio, Texas, in accordance with Base-Realignment and Closure law.

The Family and Morale, Welfare and Recreation Command was deactivated on 3 June 2011 in a ceremony at Fort Sam Houston. The deactivation ceremony formally changed FMWRC into the Installation Management Command G9 Division, commonly known as Family and MWR Programs.

The first Director, G9 for MWR Programs was James C. Abney, SES. The SES (Senior Executive Service) is a pay grade for civilians in the Federal Government, somewhat equivalent to the rank of General. Prior to this appointment, Mr. Abney was Deputy to the Commanding General of the Family and Morale, Welfare and Recreation Command (FMWRC) (now deactivated), and a Highly Qualified Expert (HQE) with duties as the Special Assistant to the FMWRC Commanding General.

A new campus for the Installation Management Command was dedicated at Fort Sam Houston on 19 Aug. 2011. Besides adding additional office space for MWR employees, the campus also features a new building for the Maj. Gen. Robert M. Joyce Family and MWR School of the Installation Management Academy, formerly the Maj. Gen. Robert M. Joyce Family and MWR Academy. The historic Fort Sam Houston Theatre is also being adapted for use by the organization. When complete, interior modifications will include a modified stage, additional storage space and more room for lighting and recording equipment.

The current director of Family and MWR Programs is Mr. Paul Burk.

== Executive summary ==
The Non-Appropriated Fund Instrumentality Program (NAFI), is operated by the Army for Department of Defense agencies and MWR programs are established, maintained, and disestablished under sole authority of Army Regulation AR215-1.

FMWR's major business partner, the Army and Air Force Exchange Service, provides a dividend to Army FMWR based on two distinct agreements. In the first, the Army shares 50 percent of AAFES net income after depreciation with the Air Force based on the number of active duty Soldiers and Airmen in each service—currently the Army receives 30 percent and the Air Force 20 percent of AAFES generated dividend revenue. Through the Army Simplified Dividend, garrisons receive 100 percent of profits from "Class VI" or personal demand supply items (such as health and hygiene products, soaps and toothpaste, writing material, snack food, beverages, cigarettes, batteries, and alcohol), 80 percent of pay telephone revenue, and 0.4 percent of all local AAFES sales. The latter component is deducted from the Army share of total AAFES profits with the remainder going to the Army Morale, Welfare, and Recreation Fund.

Revenues received from Army Lodging room charges are used solely to sustain and recapitalize the Lodging program and its facilities.

Monies derived from user fees and sales, AAFES, and recreation and amusement machine operations are invested and earn interest to benefit Army FMWR operations. When combined, NAF represents 42 percent of all funding, allowing Army FMWR programs to continue to serve more than 3.9 million patrons.

Most of this money goes to Army installations and is used to run FMWR operations, programs, and services. What is left is focused on Army-wide capital improvements and minor construction and capital purchases.

== Total Army Strong/Army Family Covenant ==
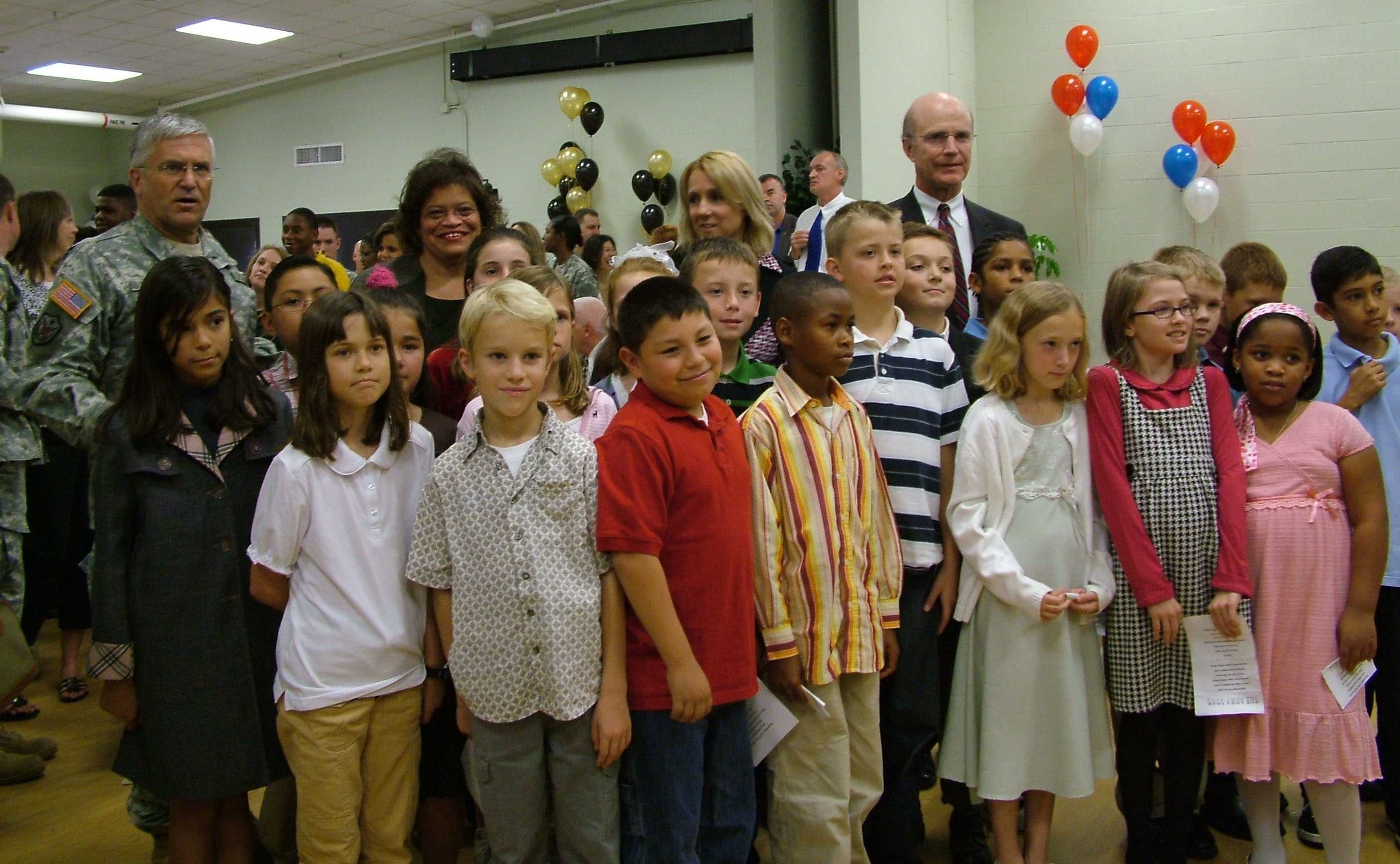
Chief of Staff of the Army Gen. George W. Casey Jr. and Secretary of the Army Pete Geren pose with Army family members after signing the Army Family Covenant at Fort Knox, Ky, 18 Oct. 2007. U.S. Army photo.

Unveiled on 8 October 2007, the Army Family Covenant institutionalized the U.S. Army's publicly announced pledge to support its soldiers and their families—Active, Guard and Reserve—with resourced programs to deliver a quality of life "commensurate with their service and sacrifice to the nation". According to U.S. Army officials, the Army Family Covenant commits the U.S. Army to enhance soldier and family readiness by:

- Standardizing family programs and services
- Increasing accessibility to health care
- Improving Soldier and family housing
- Ensuring excellence in Child, Youth & School Services
- Expanding education and employment opportunities for family members.

Since implementing the Army Family Covenant, U.S. Army senior leaders say they've made significant progress in fulfilling its promises. But, they also acknowledge more work is needed to build an environment where Army families can prosper and realize their full potential within the constraints of persistent conflict.

In 2015, the Army renamed the covenant program to "Total Army Strong." Rather than having a prescribed list of what programs stay and go, Total Army Strong will give installation commanders the authority to determine what Soldier and family quality-of-life programs work best in their particular geographic communities, because needs differ from Georgia to Washington state, to Korea.

== Family and Morale, Welfare and Recreation programs ==
=== Armed Forces Recreation Centers ===
Armed Forces Recreation Centers (AFRC) full-service resort hotels are Joint Service Facilities developed to provide vacation recreation opportunities to service members, their families, and other authorized patrons (including official travelers) of the Total Defense Force. The AFRCs are centrally-managed, U.S. Army FMWR-operated facilities.

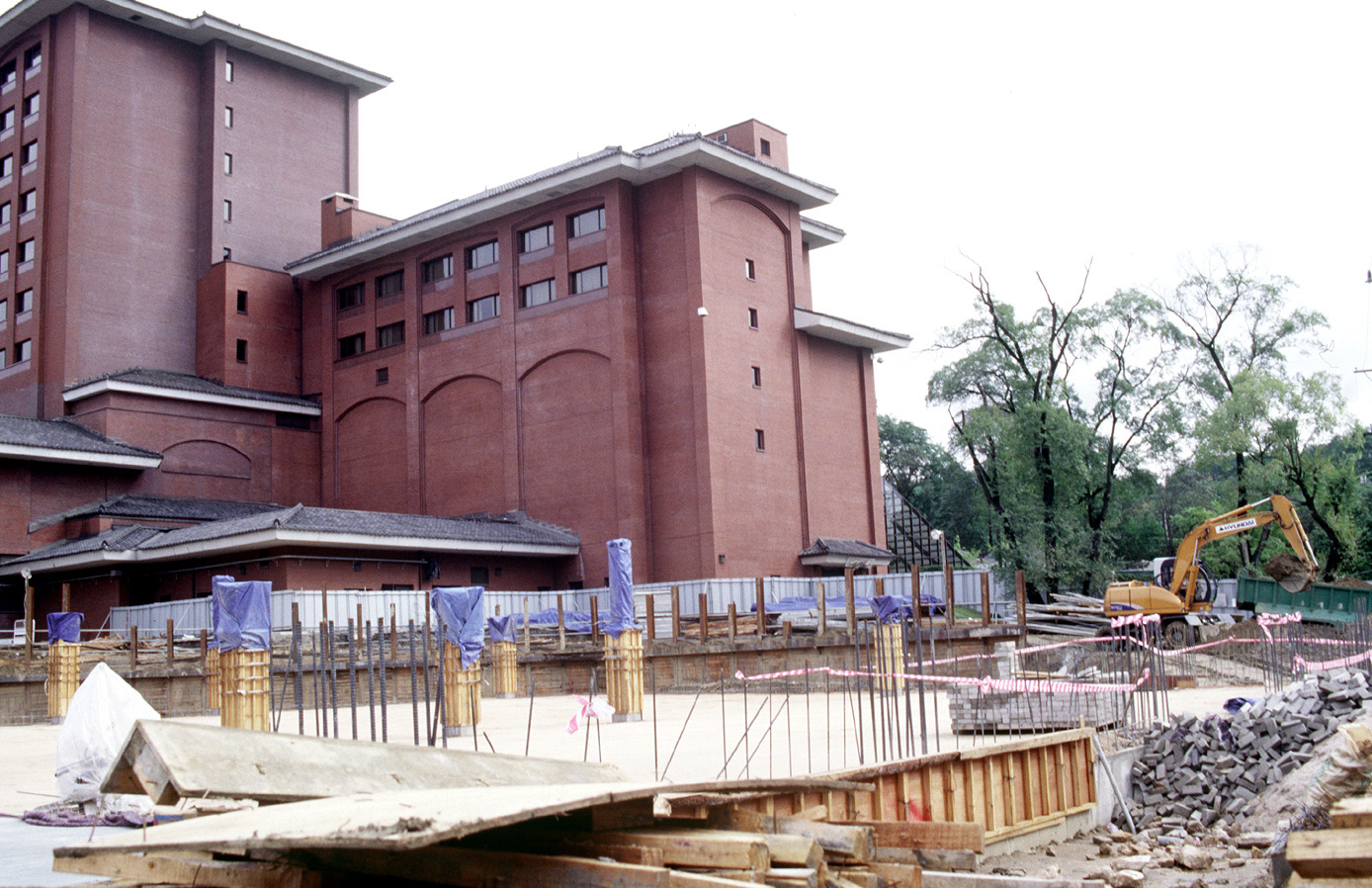
In 1998, the U.S. Army added 99 rooms to The Dragon Hill Lodge on Yongsan Garrison, Seoul, South Korea.

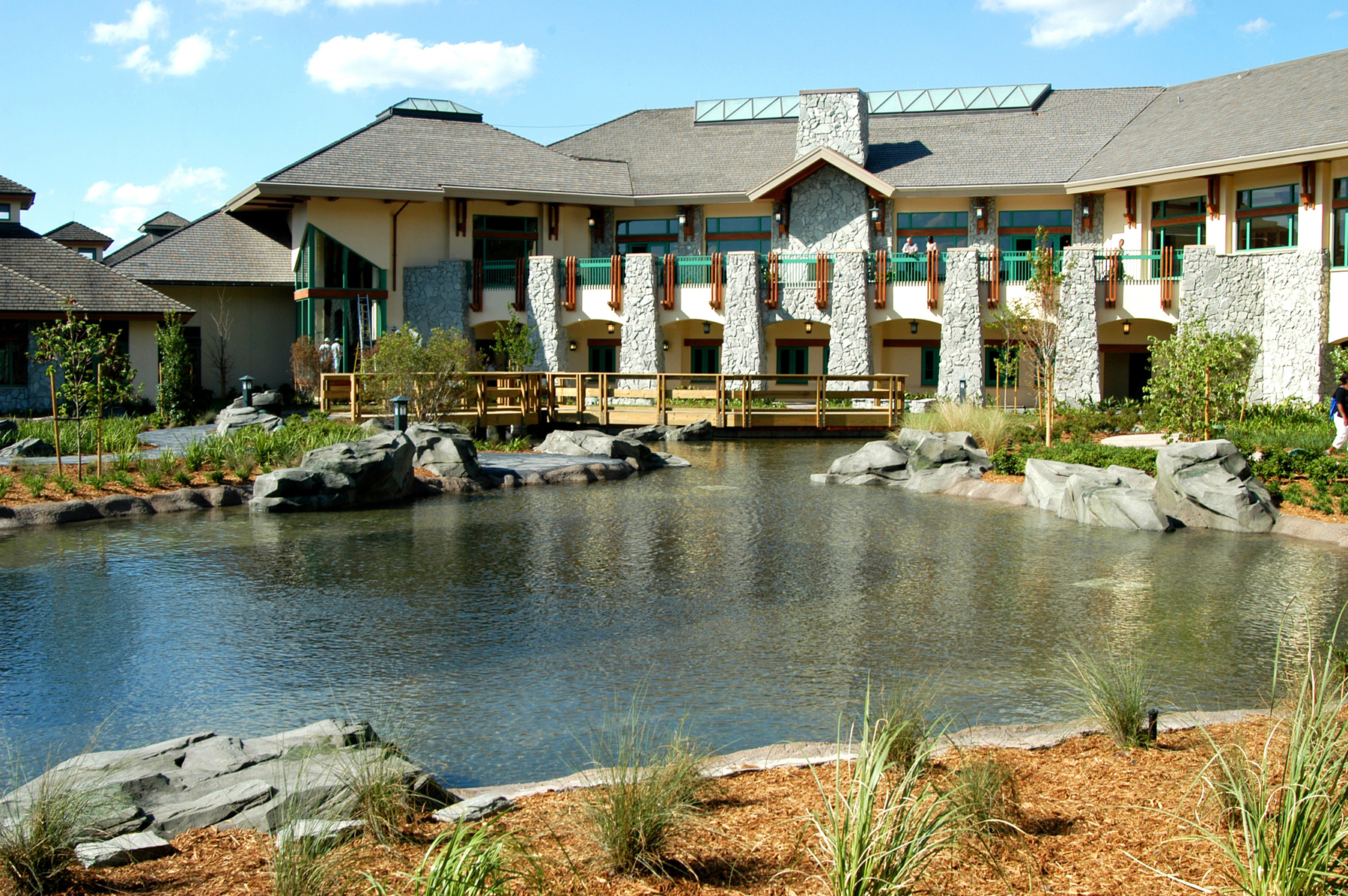
Shades of Green on Walt Disney World Resort in Florida.

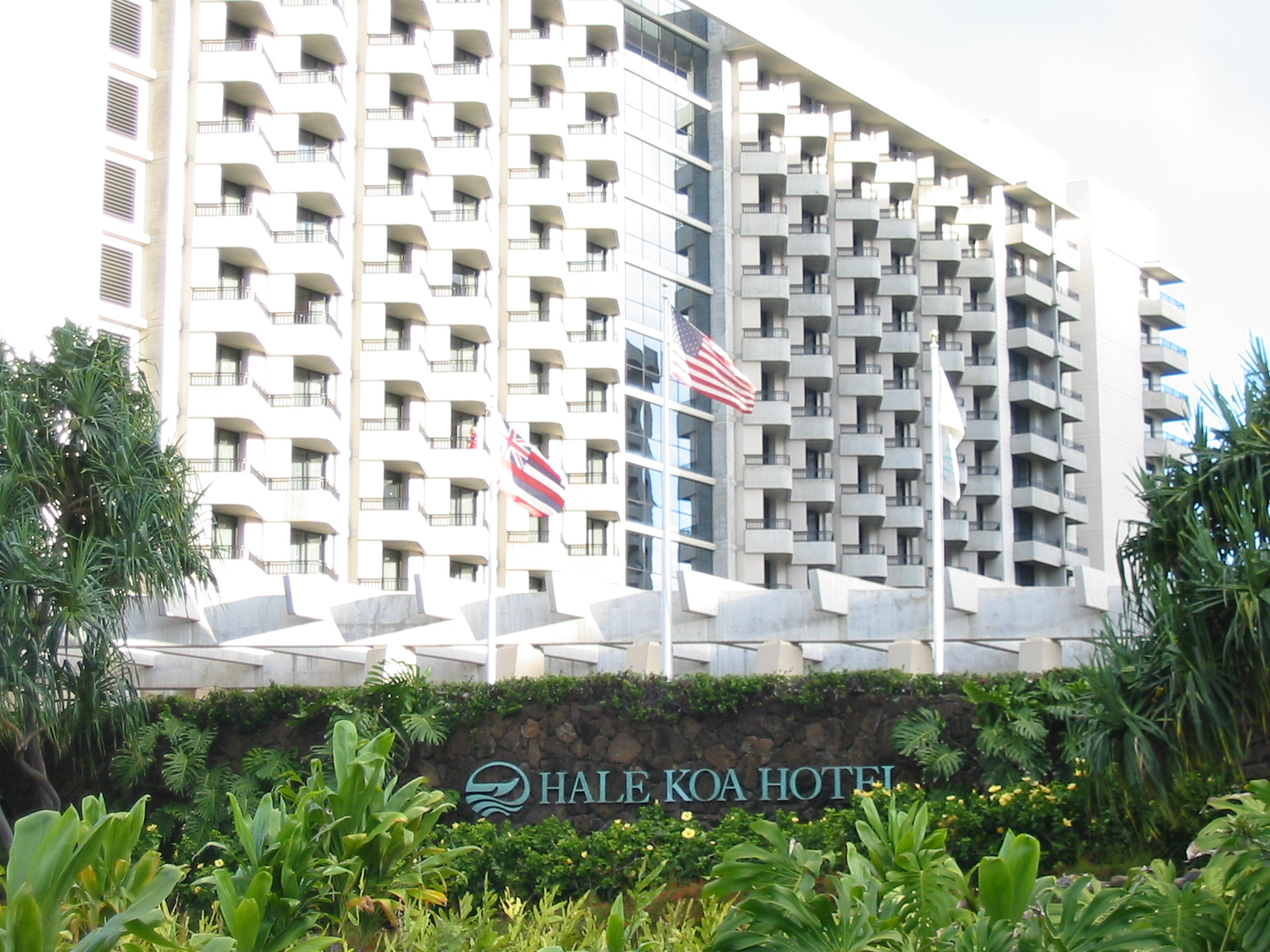
Entrance to Hale Koa Hotel in May, 2006.

Four AFRCs operate worldwide, overseen by the Army's Family and Morale, Welfare and Recreation Programs in San Antonio, Texas. The four resorts include Dragon Hill Lodge in Seoul, Korea; Edelweiss Lodge and Resort in Garmisch-Partenkirchen, Germany; the Hale Koa Hotel in Hawaii; and Shades of Green located in Walt Disney World in Orlando, Florida.

==== Dragon Hill Lodge ====
Resting in the heart of Seoul, Korea, the Dragon Hill Lodge offers 394 guest rooms, health club with indoor pool, and four restaurants to serve military personnel, Department of Defense Civilian employees, and their family members.

==== Edelweiss Lodge and Resort ====
Home to the Edelweiss Lodge and Resort. The Eidlweiss Lodge and Resort, in Garmish, Germany, is available to service members and their guests stationed within Europe.

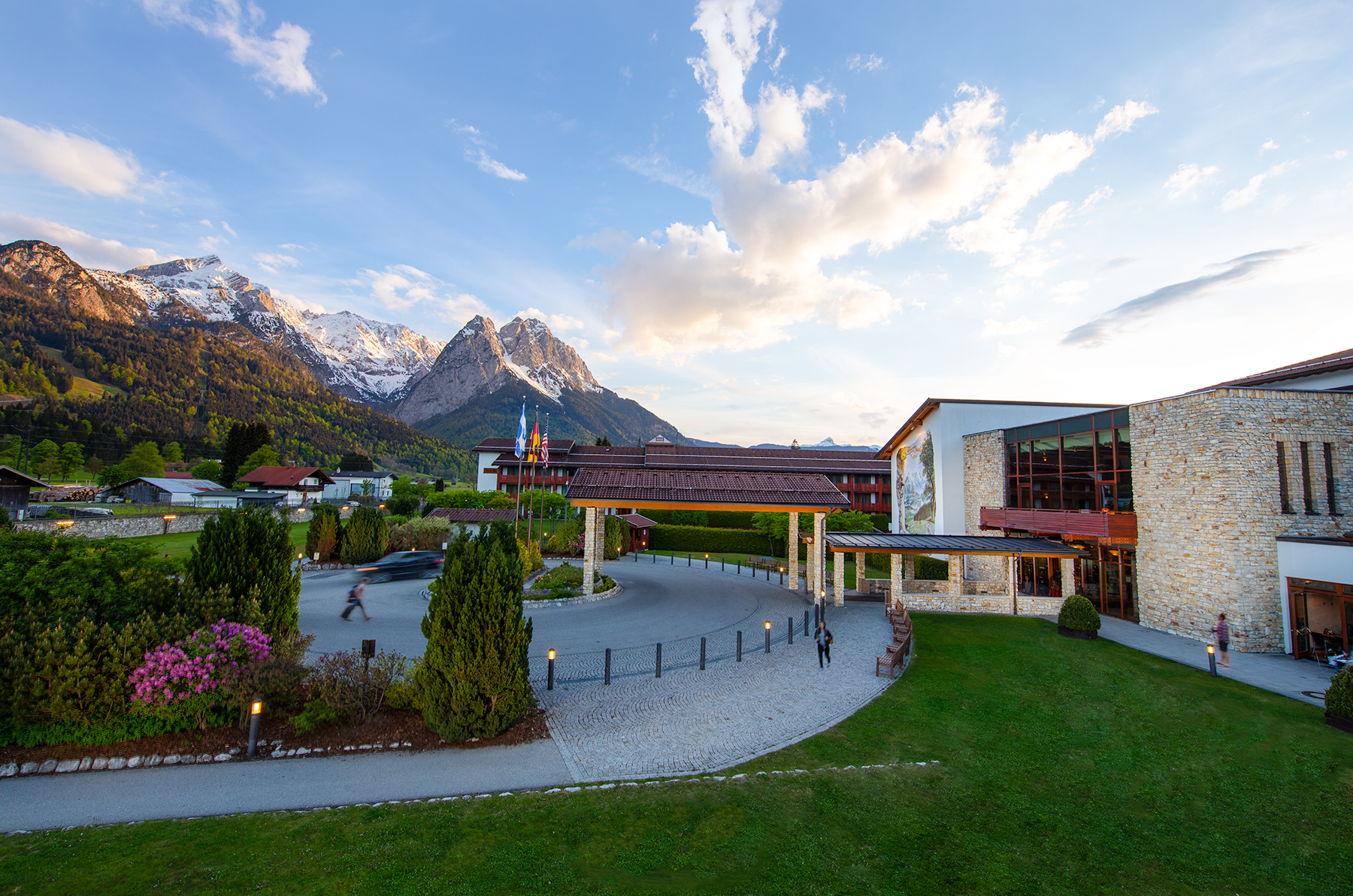
The view of mountains from the main entrance of Edelweiss Lodge and Resort. More than 350 employees at the Edelweiss Lodge and Resort provide support and care for service members and their families at this location in Germany.

==== Hale Koa Hotel ====
On 25 October 1975 a traditional Hawaiian blessing complete with royal procession opened the Hale Koa Hotel.

Today, Fort DeRussy Armed Forces Recreation Center is the home of the Hale Koa Hotel, or House of the Warrior, an 817-room resort hotel.

In 1991, a major expansion project began at the Hale Koa, including the development of 66 acres (270,000 m^{2}) of Fort DeRussy, a new swimming pool complex, two snack bars, a beverage bar and luau garden. In addition, Kalia Road, fronting the Hale Koa Hotel, was also realigned and improved. By 1995, the new Maile Tower took its place beside the existing Ilima Tower increasing the number of guestrooms from 419 to 817. Also, debuting was a 1,287 stall parking garage, fitness center, adults only pool, and a new restaurant, Bibas.

The Hale Koa operates without taxpayer dollars supporting upkeep or operation. It's estimated that over one million military personnel and dependents visit Hale Koa's facilities each year.

==== Shades of Green ====
Shades of Green opened 1 February 1994.

Shades of Green is located on Walt Disney World Resort.

=== Arts and crafts ===
The arts and crafts program offers educational, self-development activities.

FMWR hosts an annual U.S. Army Arts and Crafts and All-Army Photography Contests.

=== Automotive skills ===
The FMWR automotive skills program offers facilities, equipment, technical instruction, skilled assistance, and problem-solving services.

=== Better Opportunities for Single Soldiers ===
The BOSS program addresses single Soldier quality of life (QOL) issues and initiatives. BOSS provides a vehicle through which single soldier QOL concerns are identified and recommendations for improvement are made. This vehicle is a means to assess the interests and needs of the single Soldier. The BOSS program provides an opportunity for single Soldiers to participate in, and contribute to, their respective communities.

=== Bowling ===
FMWR Bowling center activities include bowling leagues, open bowling, tournaments, instructional programs, exhibitions, youth services-sponsored events, locker rentals, and child care services for bowling center patrons.

=== Child, Youth, and School Services (CYSS) ===
CYSS consists of four services: Child Development Services (CDS); School Age Services (SAS), Youth Services (YS), and School Liaison Officers (SLOs). Each service has associated programs. For CDS, these programs are CDCs and FCC homes. For SAS, these programs are School-Age Centers and Camps. For YS, these programs are: Youth Centers/Teen Centers and CYSS Sports and Fitness (S&F). For SLOs, these programs are Youth Education Support and Outreach.

=== Community Recreation Centers ===
Community Recreation Center (CRC) programs and services support the overall FMWR mission and according to the U.S. Army are directly related to unit readiness by delivering individual and group activities during peacetime, mobilization, contingency, and wartime operations.

=== Entertainment (performing arts) ===
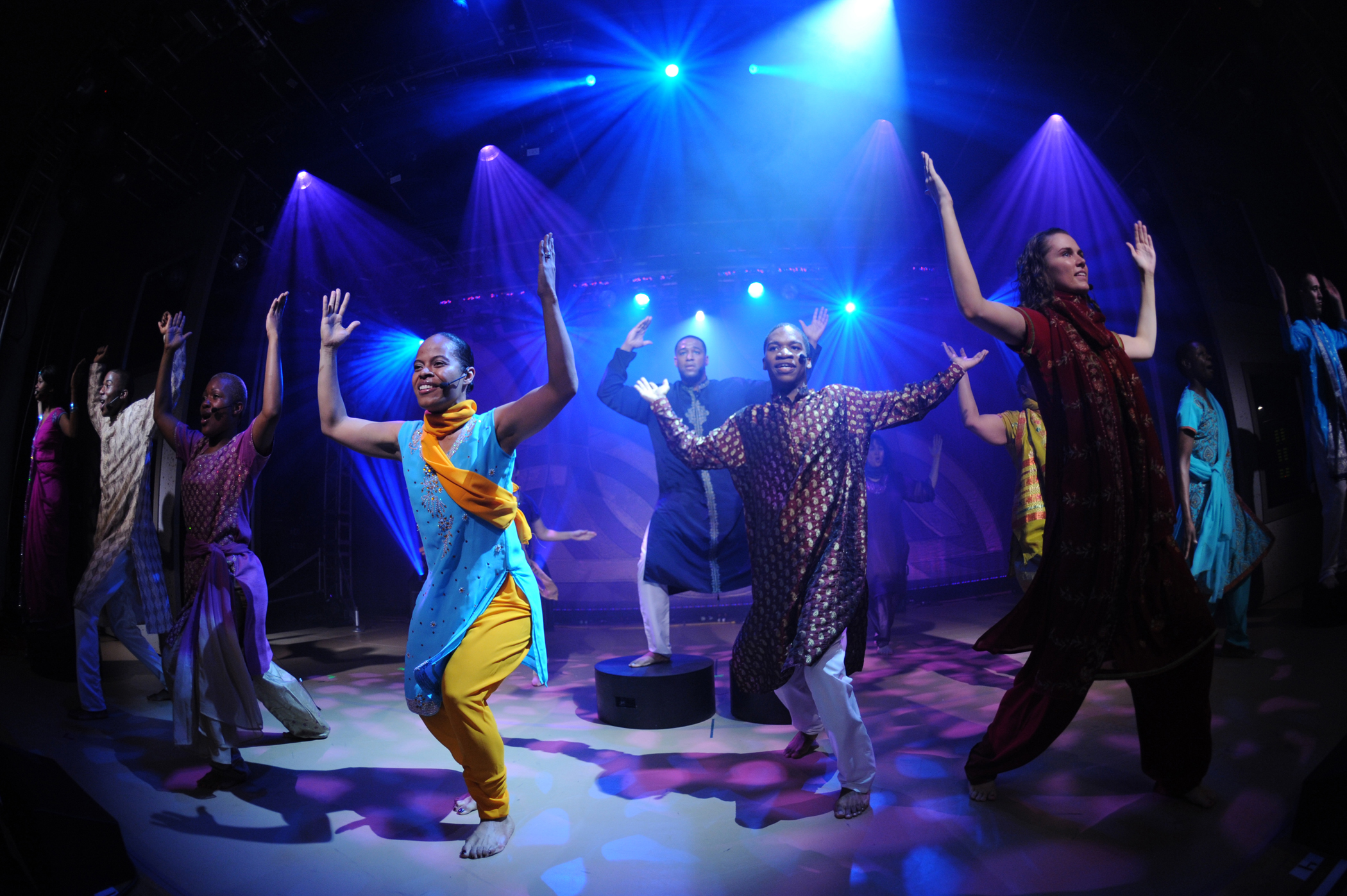
Soldiers perform "Jai Ho" from the soundtrack of multiple Oscar Award-winning Slumdog Millionaire during rehearsals for the 2009 U.S. Army Soldier Show at Wallace Theater on Fort Belvoir, Va.

The FMWR entertainment program provides diverse musical, unit entertainment activities, special events, and theater entertainment. The U.S. Army's entertainment program also includes local performing arts centers and the U.S. Army Soldier Show.

=== Golf ===
The Army golf program offers recreational golf, open play, tournaments, and services such as golf instruction, golf resale, food and beverage services, catering, and other golf-related activities for eligible patrons.

=== Gyms & physical fitness centers ===
According to the U.S. Army, physical fitness programs develop the cardiovascular fitness, strength conditioning, flexibility, and recreation of Army personnel. For most U.S. Army garrisons, physical fitness facilities are the hub of the installation-level sports and fitness programs. Authorized patrons are generally afforded access to Army gyms and physical fitness centers at no cost to the patron.

=== Leisure Travel Services ===
FMWR Leisure Travel Services (LTS) provide information and access for personal travel and travel related services at representative industry or discount prices. LTS often provide Army personnel access to commercial travel and tourism discounts.

=== Library & information services ===
According to the U.S. Army, on-post libraries are a central information resource for the military community providing the tools and services to impact mission readiness, support lifelong learning, enable literacy, and enhance the military community's well-being. Services found at garrison libraries include borrower services, inter-library loan access, reference/research support, educational support, and technical services. Army libraries also offer information technology resources, and internet access. Army libraries are subject to standards of regional educational accrediting associations, the American Council on Education, and the Military Installation Voluntary Educational Review, which review and accredit colleges and universities offering classes on Army installations.

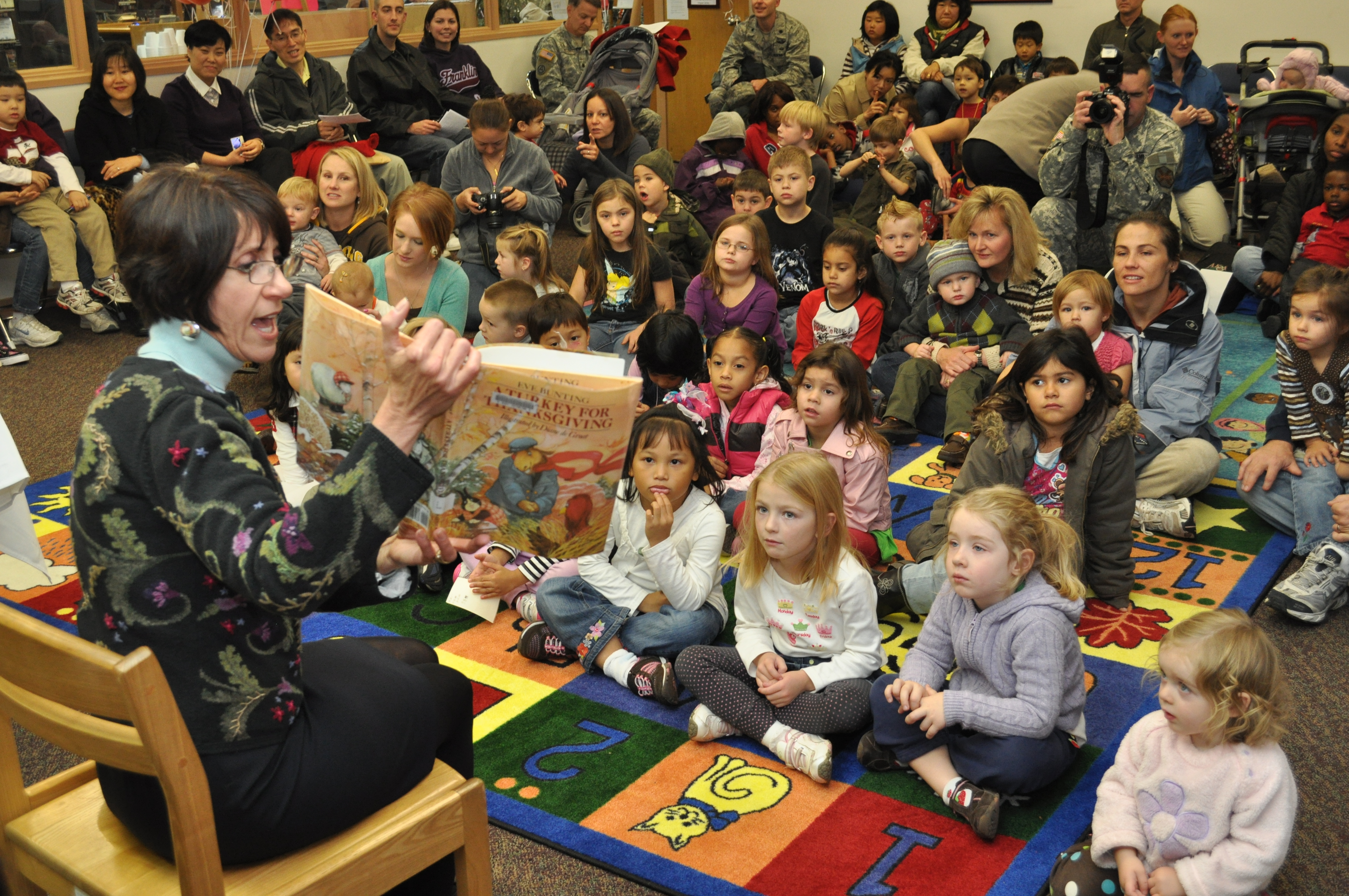
Joanne Sharp, wife of Gen. Walter Sharp, United States Forces Korea commanding general, visits the U.S. Army's Yongsan Garrison Library on 21 Nov. 2009 to read to military family members as part of a Thanksgiving Story Hour. U.S. Army photo

A listing for all the Army MWR libraries can be found at the FMWR website.

=== Movies ===
The FMWR movie program provides free-admission motion picture entertainment to isolated or deployed military personnel and civilians.

=== Food, beverage, and entertainment on military installations ===
By U.S. Army regulation, MWR food, beverage, and entertainment (FB&E) programs encompass all MWR food operations such as military clubs (membership and nonmembership), FB&E operations, and snack bar operations in MWR facilities such as bowling, golf, and recreation centers. MWR FB&E programs are a part of a commander's overall food service programs and assist the commander, along with AAFES and subsistence/troop feeding, in meeting the food service needs an Army installation's assigned or visiting personnel.

=== Outdoor recreation ===
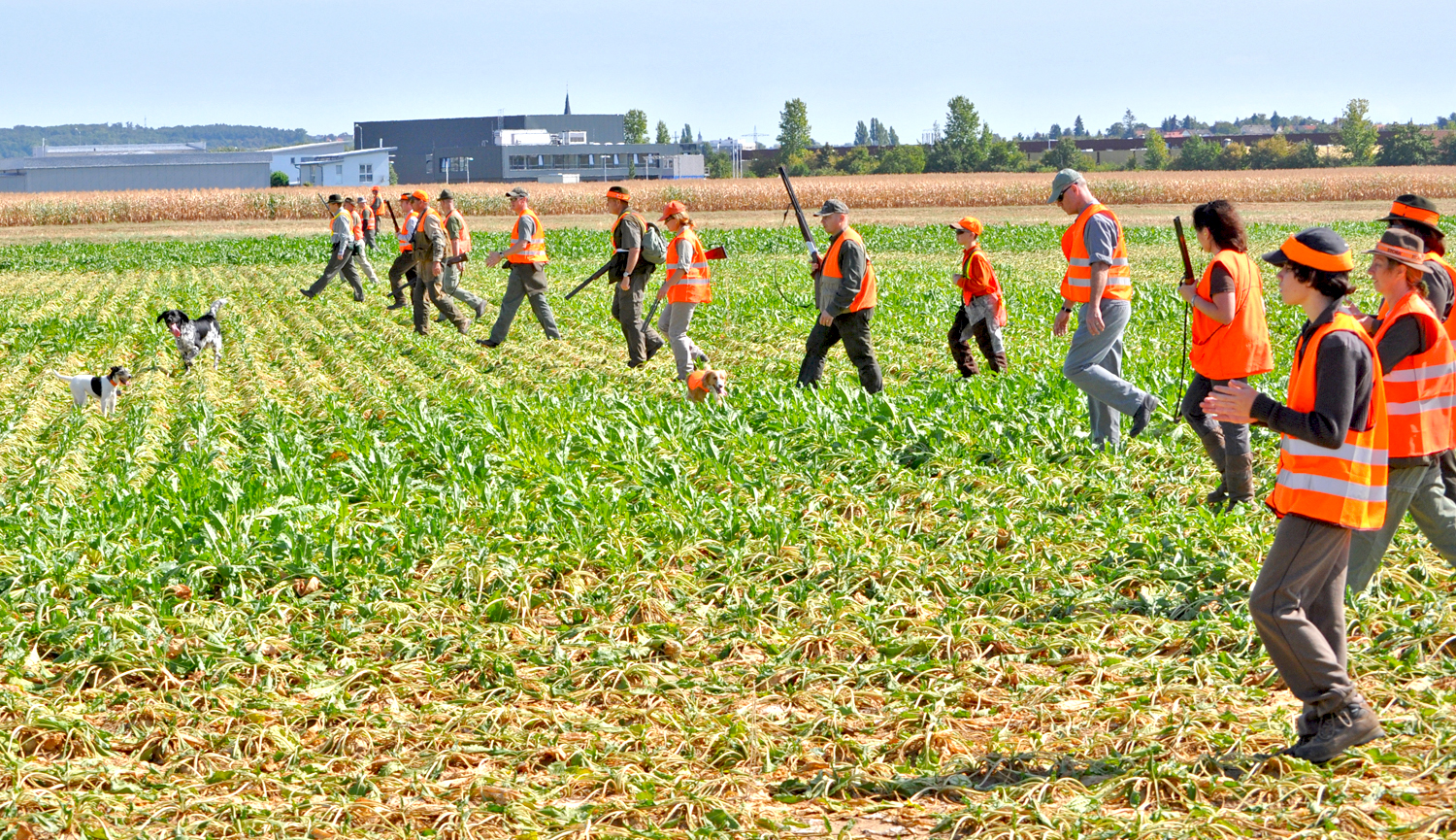
Foxhunting in Germany organized by Wiesbaden Outdoor Recreation's Hunting, Fishing and Sport Shooting Program

The FMWR outdoor recreation program provides structured and recreation activities and instruction. By regulation, it offers diverse, healthful, vigorous, and comprehensive outdoor recreation programs, while conserving and protecting wildlife, forests, wetlands, and other natural resources.

=== Sports and fitness ===
U.S. Army installation and unit-level intramural programs are designed for broad-based participation in a full range of individual and team intramural programs consistent with patron interest, availability of suitable facilities, unit missions, and climate. The U.S. Army encourages commanders to use these programs provide opportunities to enhance individual morale and unit esprit de corps, promote teamwork and cooperation, engage in competitive recreation, and to encourage individuals to attain and sustain high levels of physical fitness and physical readiness. FMWR emphasizes group participation in unit and intramural sports with wide appeal, such as softball, volleyball, flag football, basketball, running, skeet, and soccer. Sports and fitness programming also includes instruction, practice, and competition at all skill levels. Generally, playing rules published by U.S. national sports governing bodies are used for all competitions conducted within the Army.

=== Swimming ===
U.S. Army swimming programs a designed promote fitness and recreation and include instruction, lifeguard training, fitness programs, competitive swimming, water safety, military survival training and recreation.

== Special programs and services ==
=== Survivor Outreach Services ===
Survivor Outreach Services (SOS) provides specialized resources to assist families of deceased soldiers. The program aims to provide access to support, information and services at a location near the survivor, for as long as needed.

The program exists as a joint effort between FMWR, the Installation Management Command (IMCOM), the Casualty and Mortuary Affairs Operation Center (CMAOC), the Army National Guard and Army Reserve.

=== Exceptional Family Member Program ===
The Exceptional Family Member Program (EFMP) works with other military and civilian agencies to provide comprehensive and coordinated community support, housing, educational, medical, and personnel services worldwide to military families with special needs. As a specific example, EFMP provides temporary rest periods for family members who serve as caregivers to persons with disabilities. Depending on unique circumstances, the care can be provided at either the home of the care user or the home of care provider. It can also be provided in other settings such as camps and enrichment programs. Within the Army, EFMP is governed by Army Regulation 608–75.

=== Army Entertainment Detachment ===
==== Soldier Show ====
The U.S. Army Soldier Show is a musical ensemble of soldiers which tours military installations annually. Its current form originated in 1983 from several existing shows, but Sgt. Israel Beilin directed the first version of the Army Soldier Show, "Yip Yip Yaphank" in 1918. Beilin is better known as Irving Berlin. He also coined the ensemble's motto: "Entertainment for the Soldier, by the Soldier."

Following the selection of the cast and crew, soldiers work with the Army Entertainment Detachment of FMWR as a deployable military unit. Training at Fort Belvoir lasts six weeks, after which time, the group tours for up to seven months. Performances can include up to 40 songs in a variety of genres during each 90-minute performance.

The Soldier Show is not funded with any taxpayer funds, but with non-appropriated funds generated by business programs of FMWR.

The theme for the 2011 season is "Carnival – A Traveling Thank You."

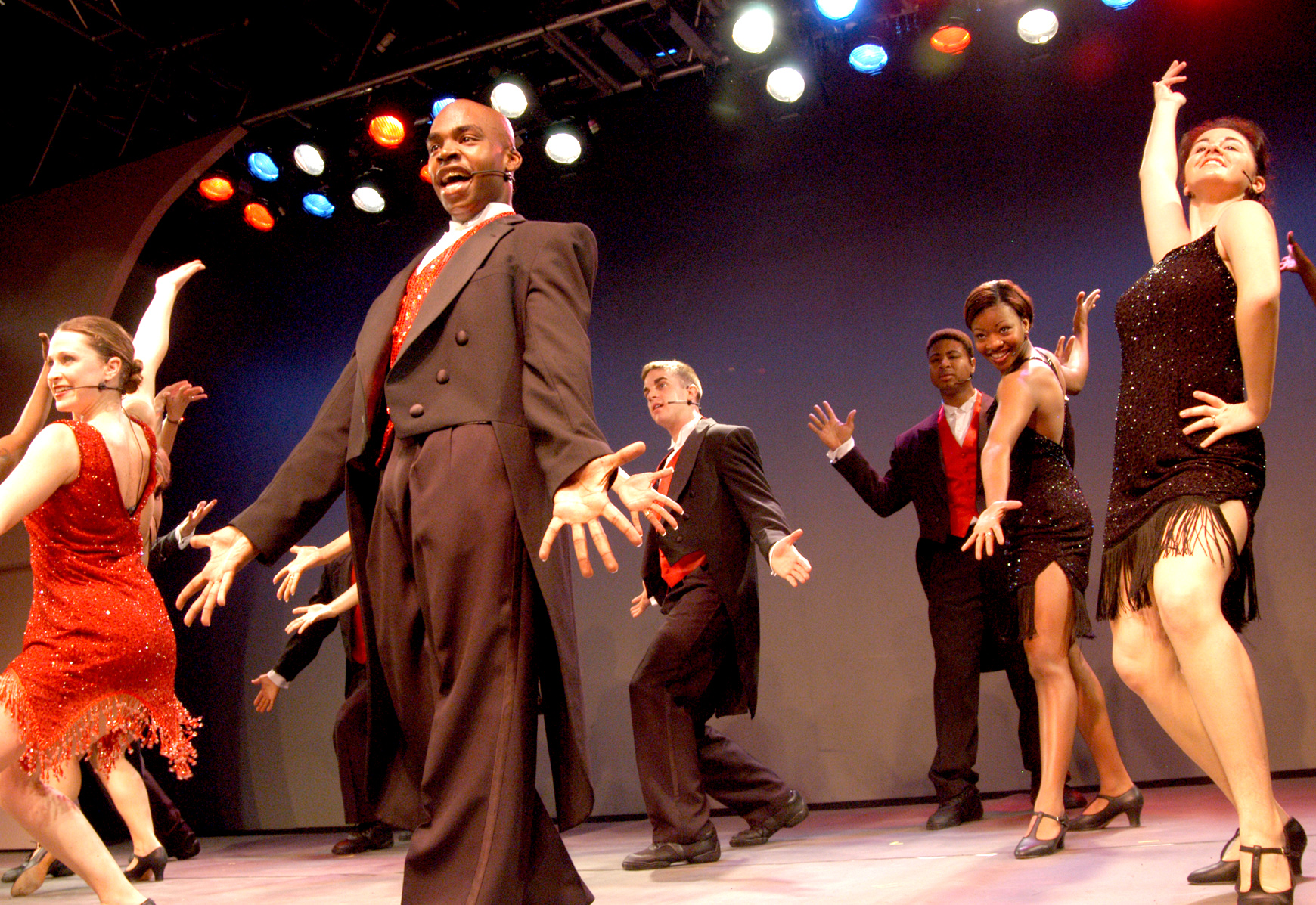
U.S. Army Soldier Show at Fort Belvoir, Va.

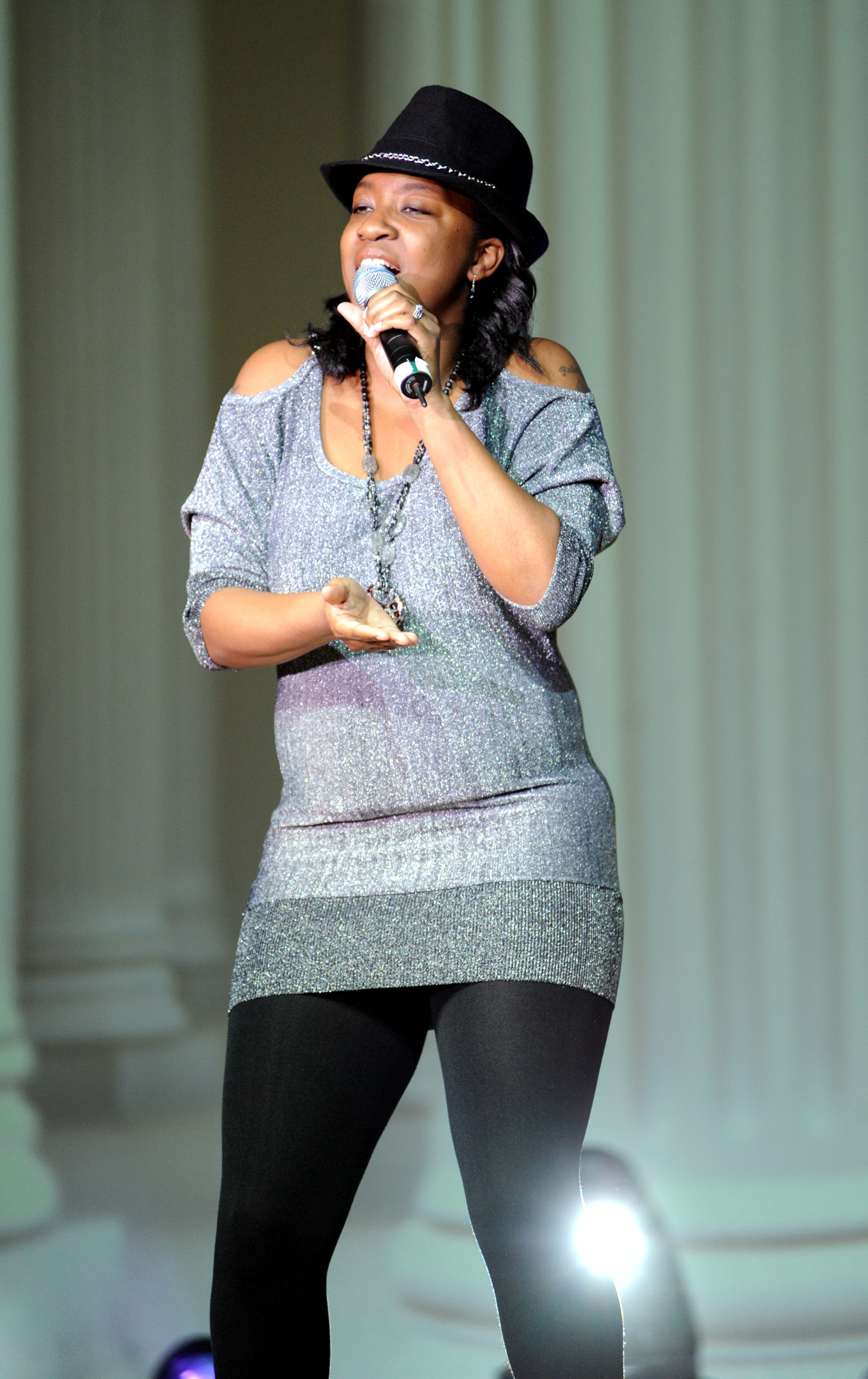
Staff Sgt. Talitha Nettles of Walter Reed Army Medical Center in Washington sings Mariah Carey's "Hero" during live auditions for the 2011 U.S. Army Soldier Show at Wallace Theater on Fort Belvoir.

==== Operation Rising Star ====
Operation Rising Star is an annual singing competition for military service members and their spouses in the style of American Idol. Auditions are conducted annually at military garrisons around the world and the semifinalists travel to Fort Belvoir in Virginia to compete in the final phases of the competition.

Following the competition, winners record a three-song demo CD at DMI Music's Firehouse Recording Studios in Pasadena, California.

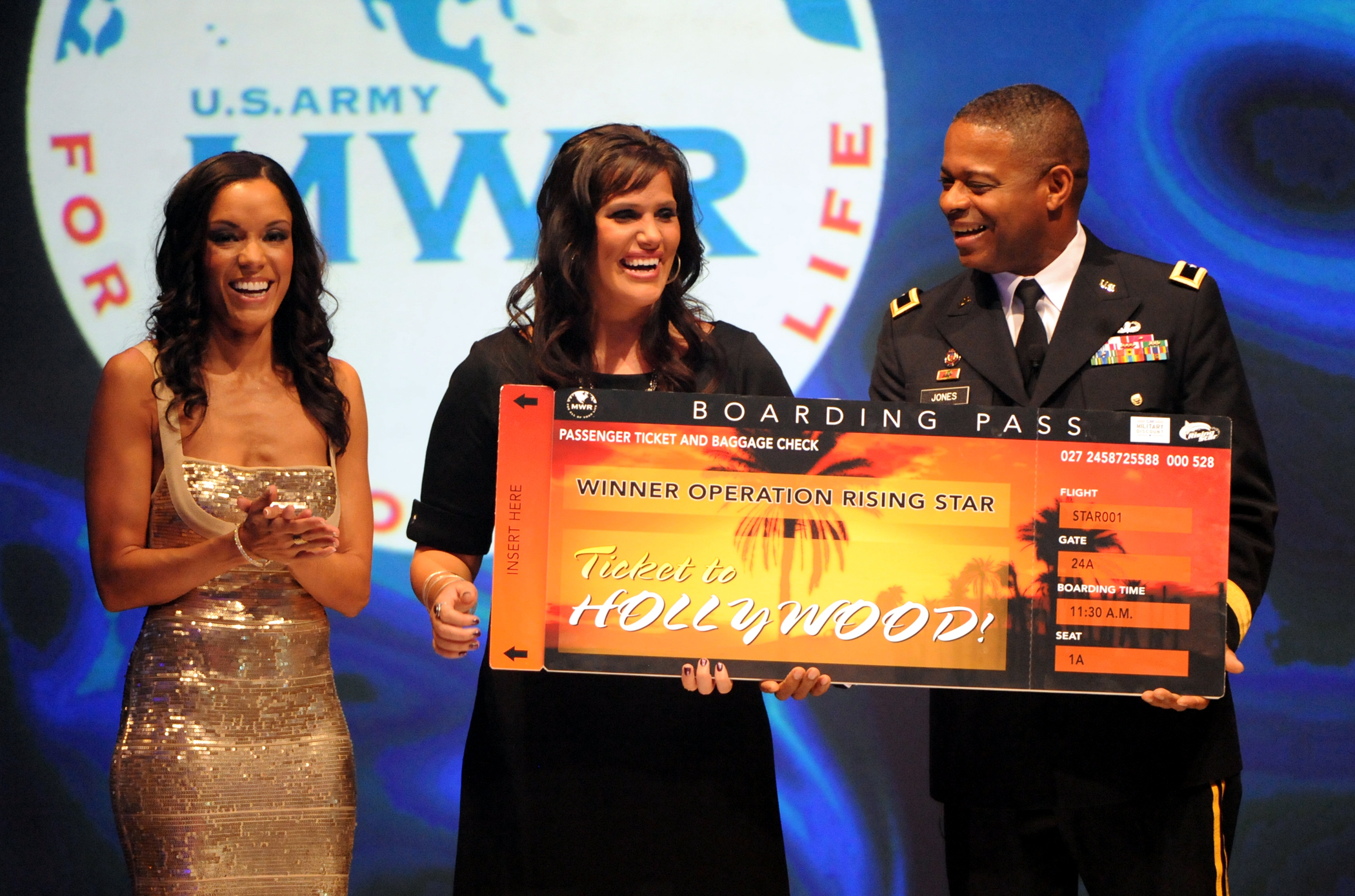
Army Family and Morale, Welfare and Recreation Commander then Brig. Gen. Reuben D. Jones (right) presents a boarding pass to Operation Rising Star winner Lisa Pratt as co-host GeNienne Samuels (left) applauds on 20 Nov. 2009 at Fort Belvoir, Va.'s Wallace Theater.

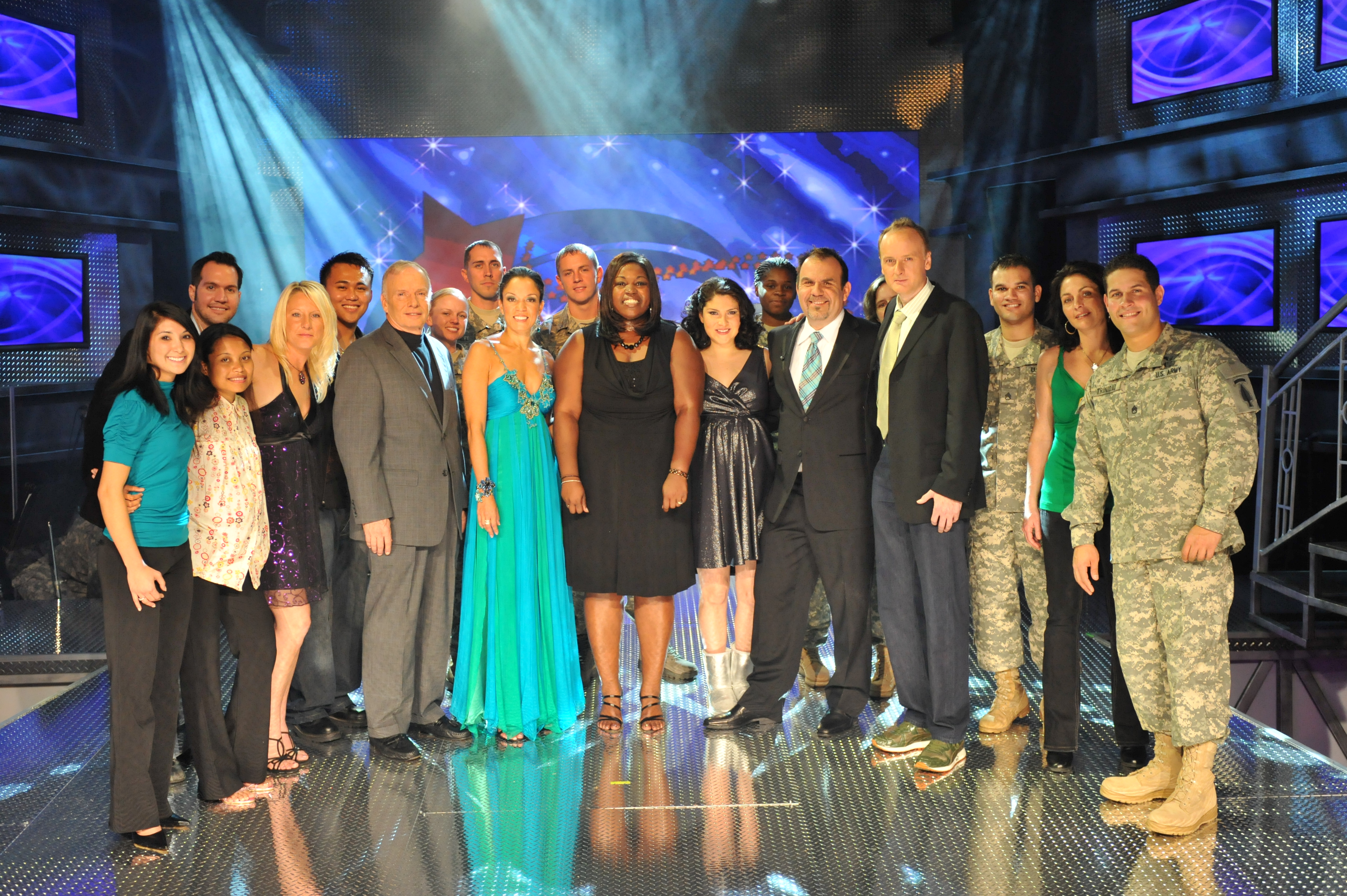
Army Family member and veteran Joyce Dodson won the 2008 Operation Rising Star military singing contest 14 Nov. at Wallace Theater.

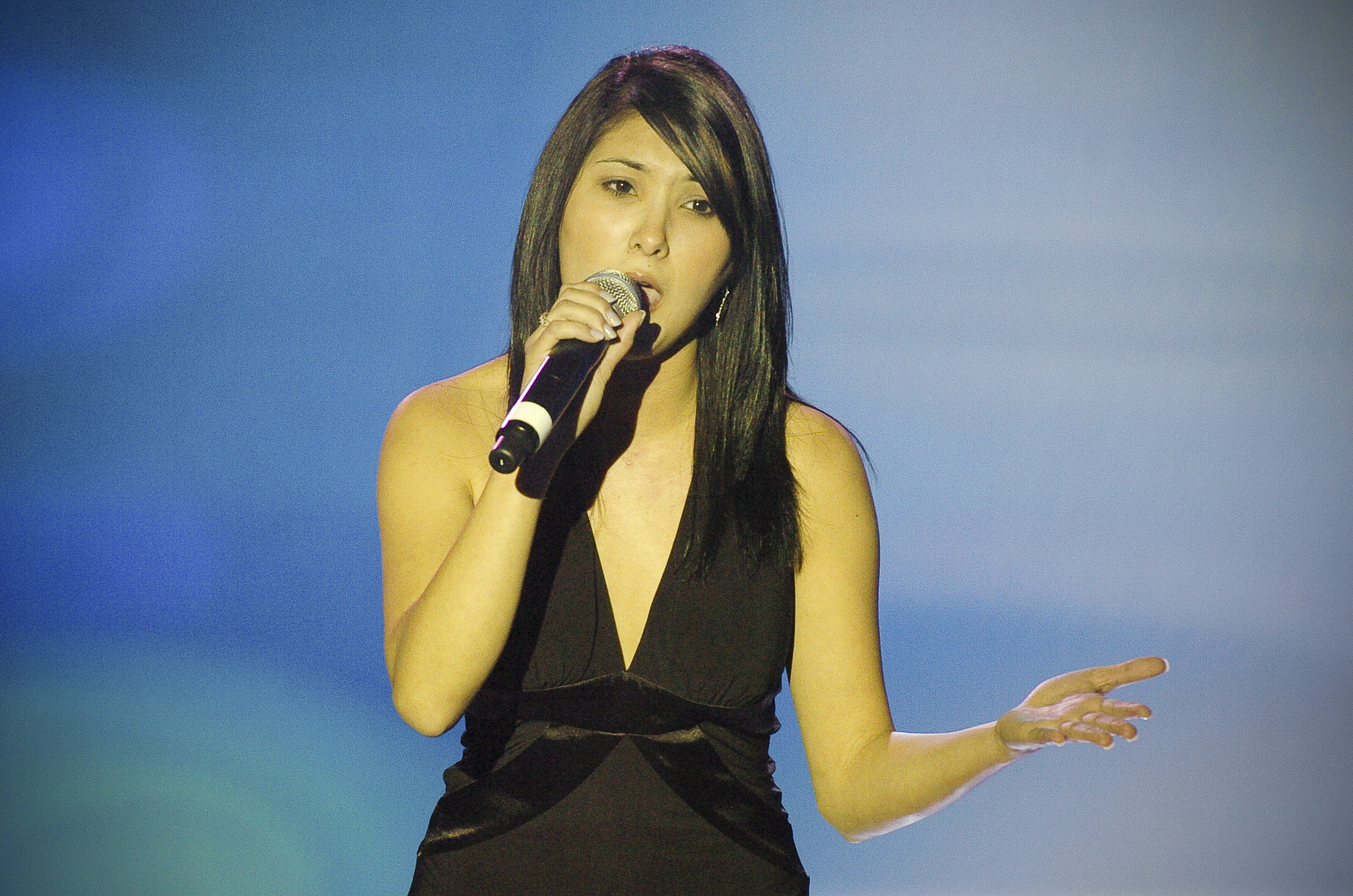
Operation Rising Star (Finals), 2008

==== Army Concert Tour ====
The Army Concert Tour is a summer concert series that brings popular music acts to Army installations. Performers for the 2010 season include Toby Keith, Ludacris, Sammy Hagar, Creed and Miranda Lambert, in addition to others.

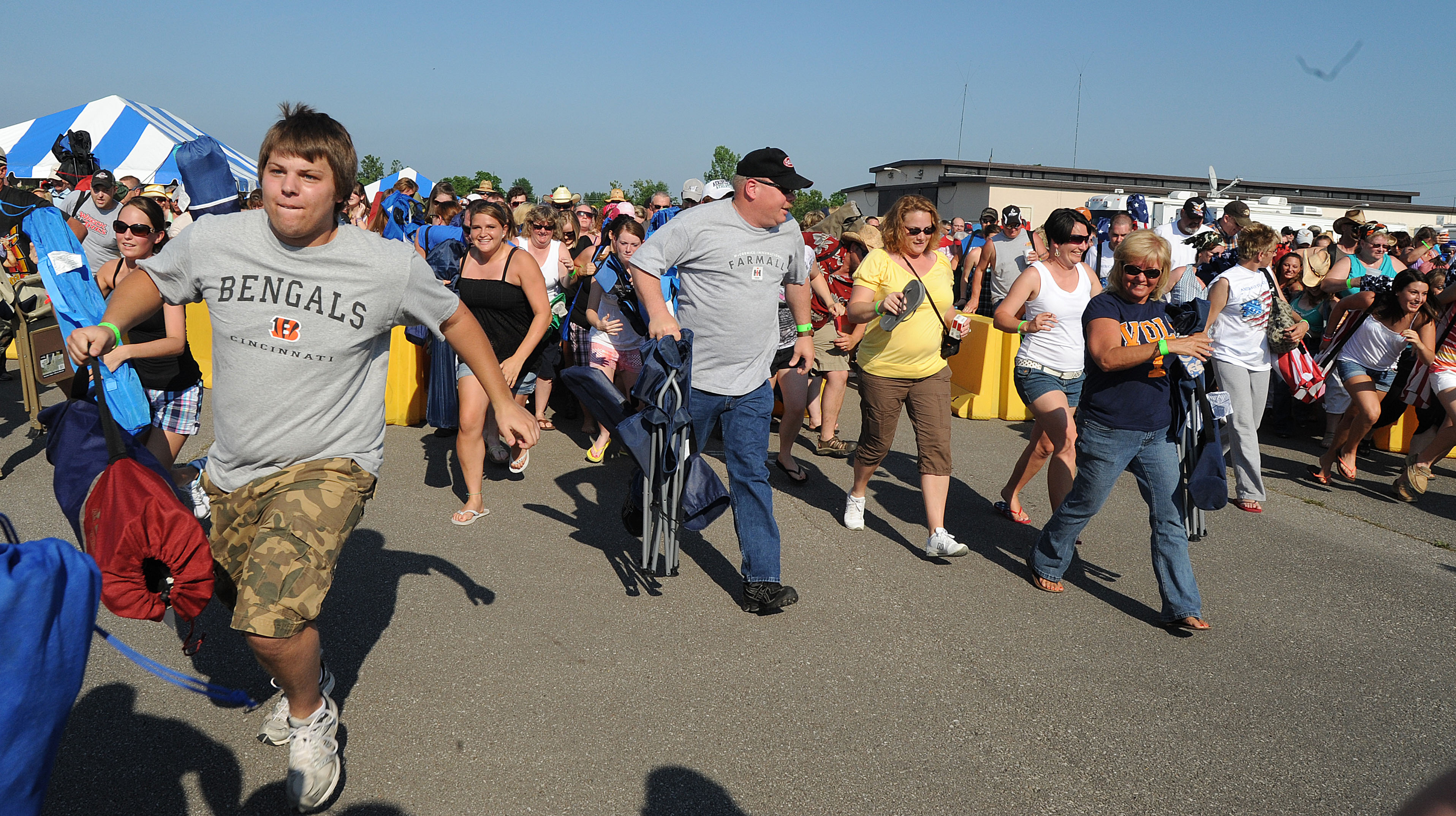
Audience members rush toward the stage after the gates open at an Army Concert Tour stop at Fort Knox.

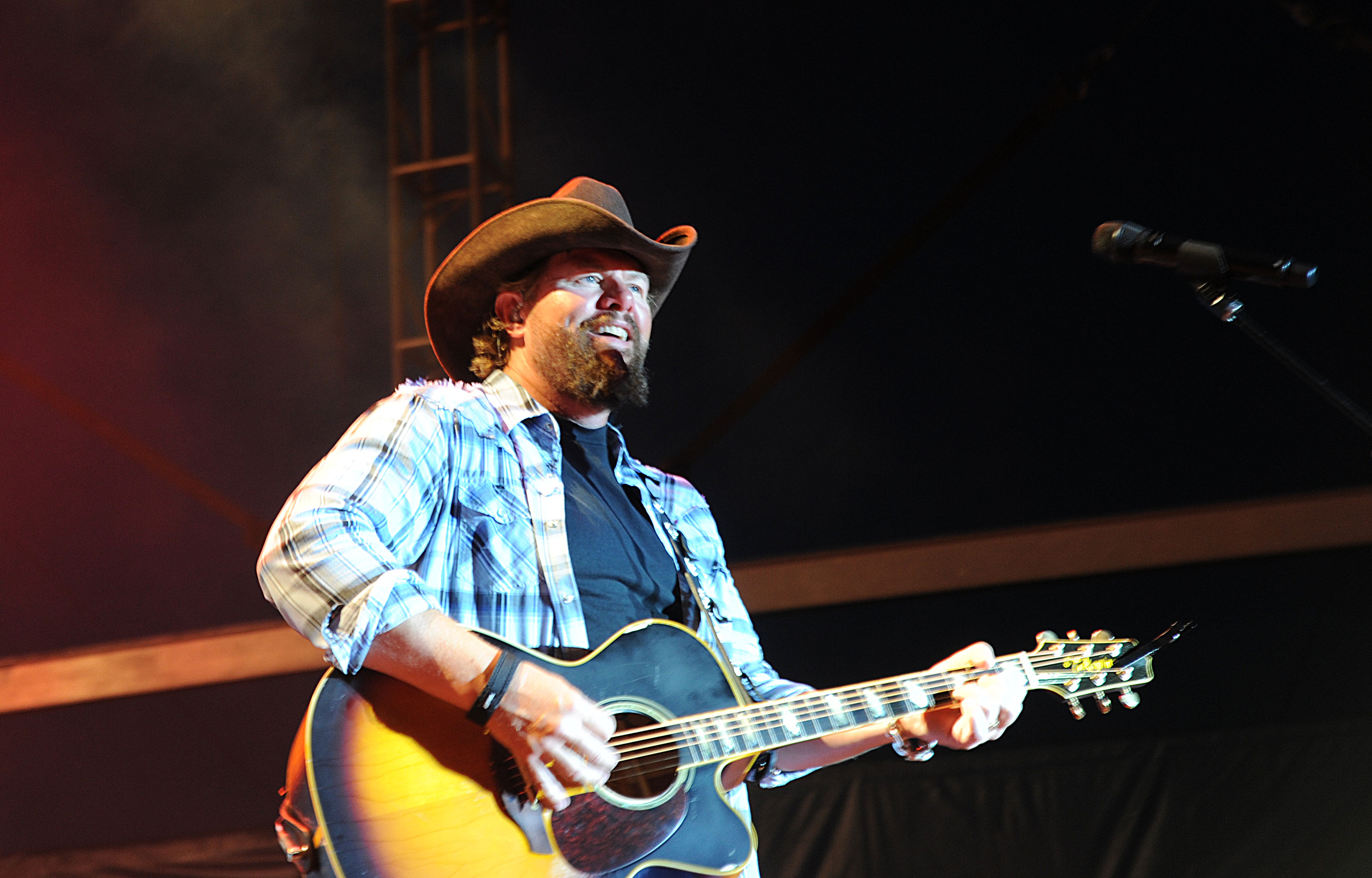
Toby Keith is a headliner at several Army Concert Tour stops during the 2010 season.

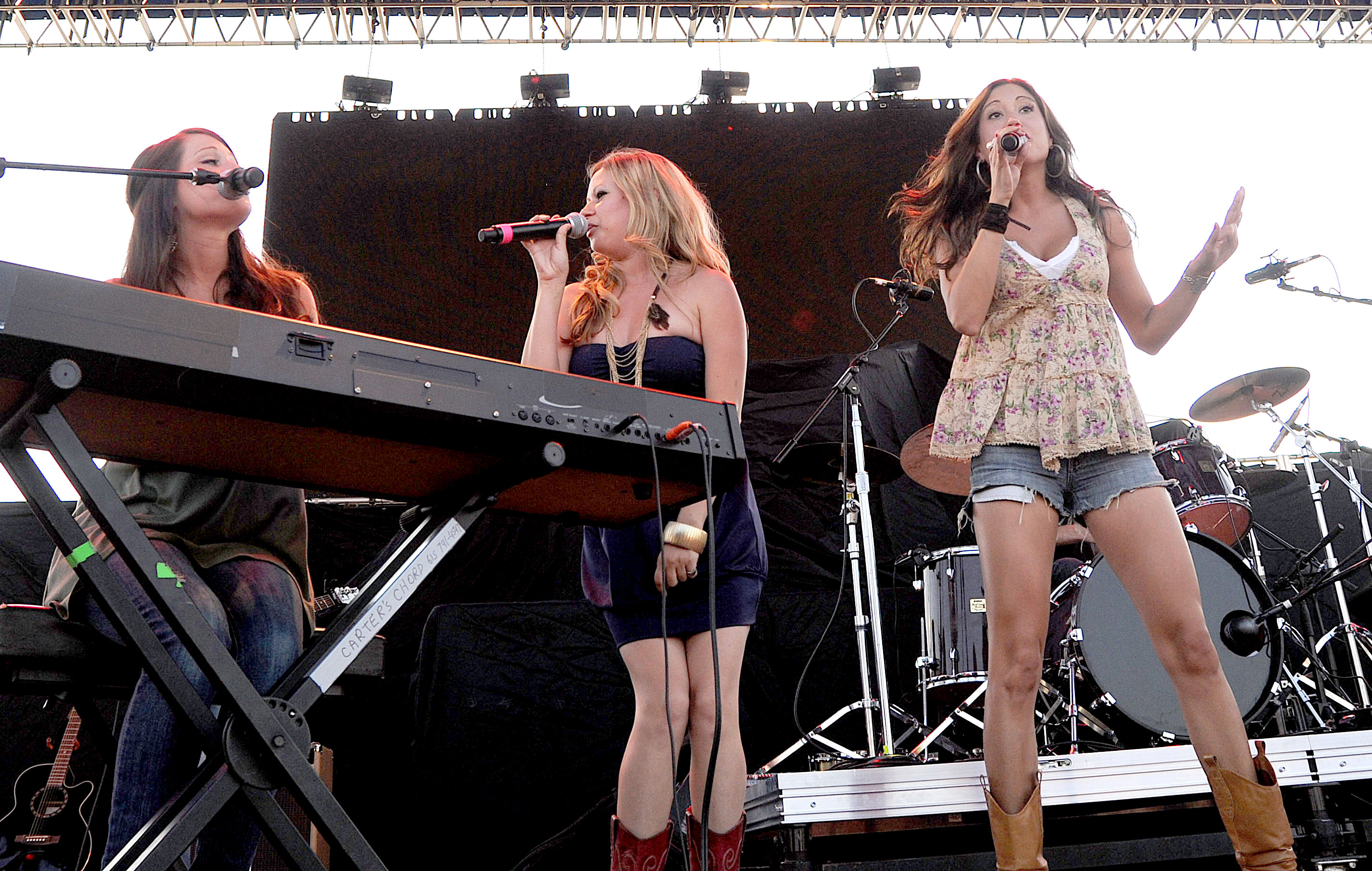
Carter's Chord performs at Fort Knox as part of the Army Concert Tour.

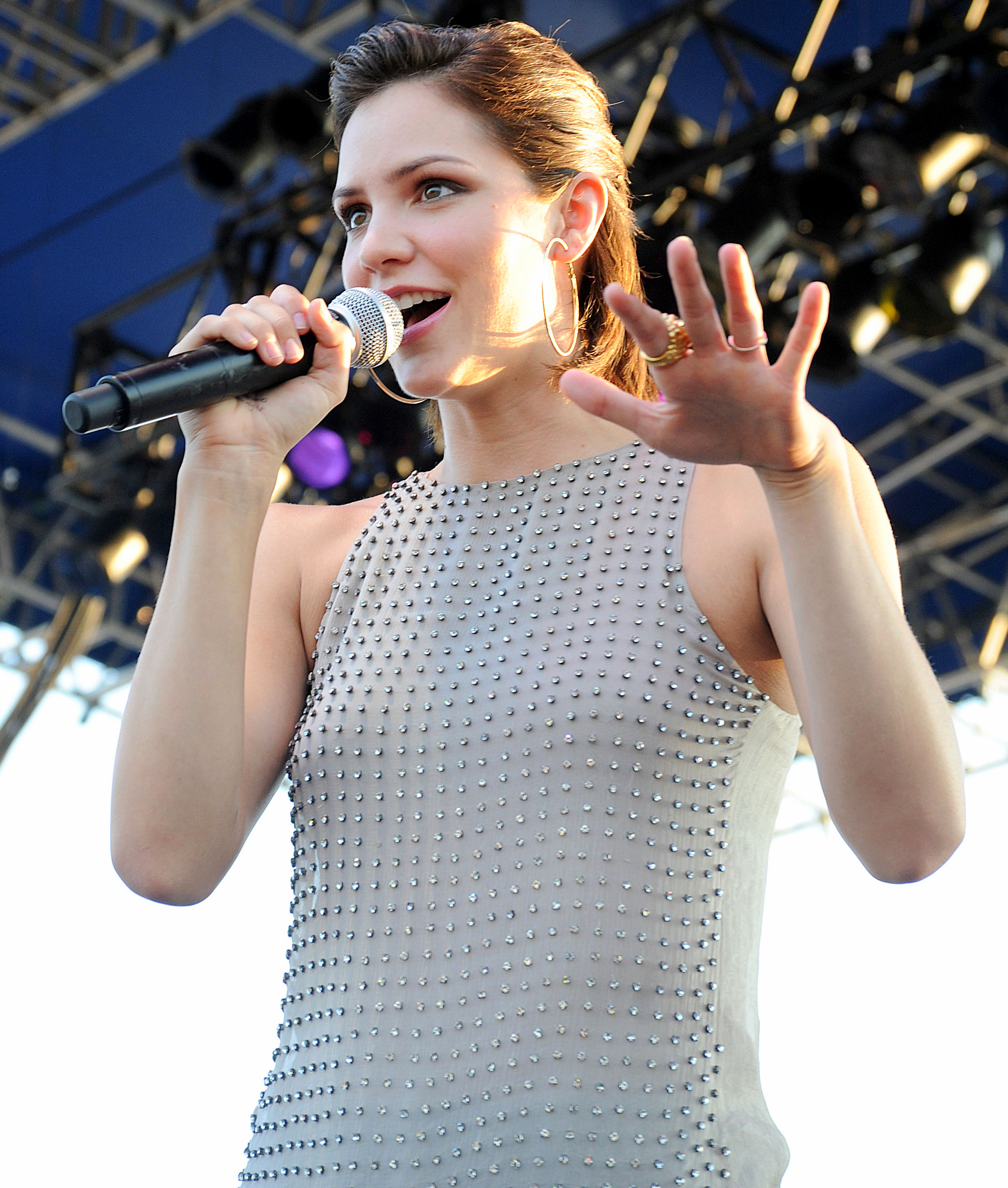
As part of the Army Concert Tour, Katharine McPhee sings for the crowd at Fort Knox.

=== Warrior Adventure Quest ===
Warrior Adventure Quest provides recreational opportunities for soldiers during the transition period immediately following deployment. Past activities have included white-water rafting, paintball and mountain biking. Army officials hope that by utilizing the program, there will be a reduction in high-risk off-duty activities.

WAQ is managed by the Outdoor Recreation Program of Family and MWR. According to Army officials, the average cost per person to participate in WAQ is $86.

=== World Class Athlete Program ===
The U.S. Army World Class Athlete Program (WCAP) provides soldier-athletes the opportunity to compete toward qualifying for the United States Olympic team. Qualified soldiers must be nationally ranked in their chosen sport and be certified by the United States Olympic Committee at a world class level. Athletes join the program at least three years before the Olympic Trials. To be eligible for the U.S. Army World Class Athlete Program, soldiers must currently be a member of the Active Army, Army Reserve, or Army National Guard. Soldiers must also be eligible to represent the US in international competitions and demonstrate the potential to qualify for the U.S. Olympic Team or U.S. Paralympic Team.

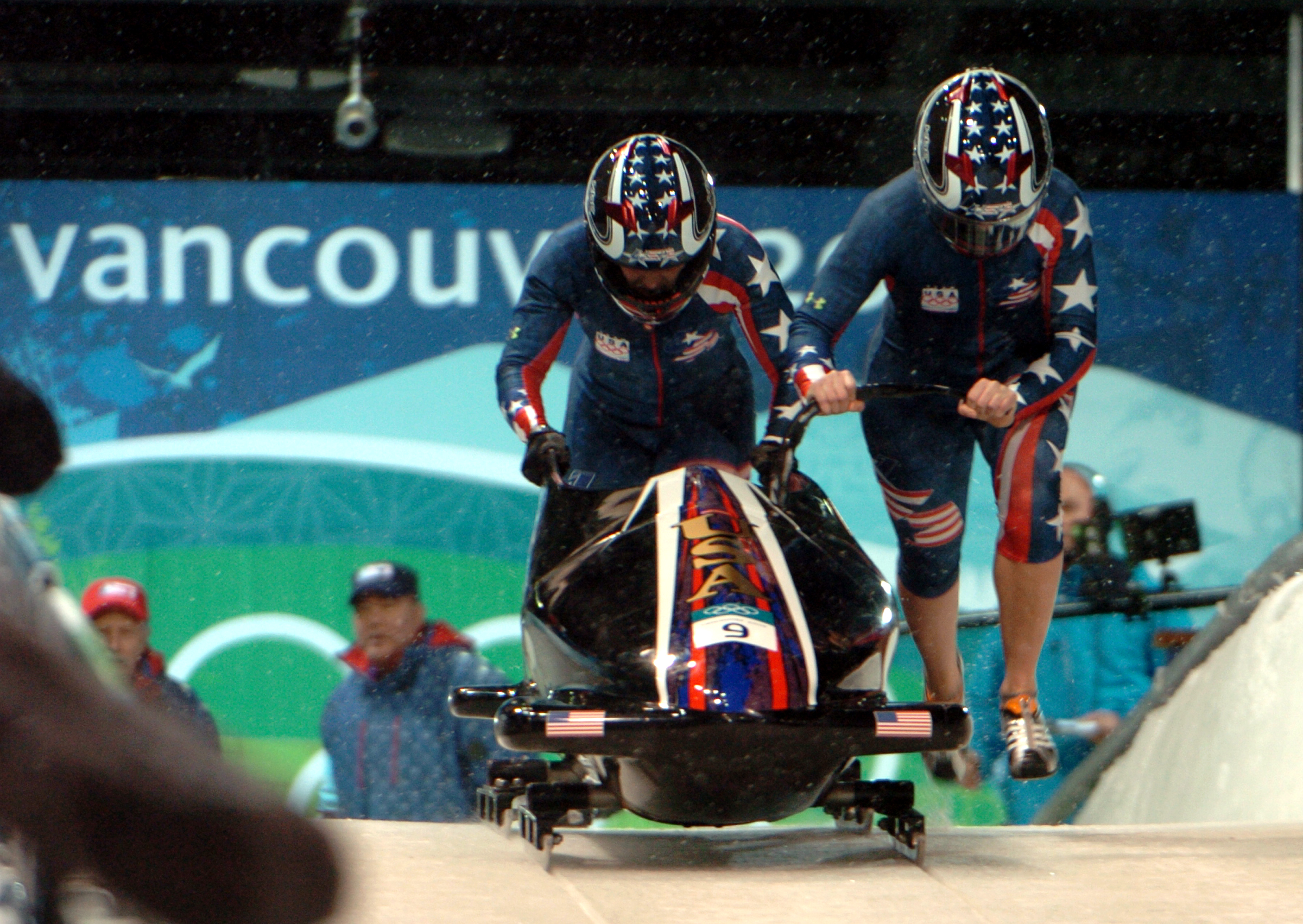
Army National Guard Outstanding Athlete Program, 2010 Winter Olympics.

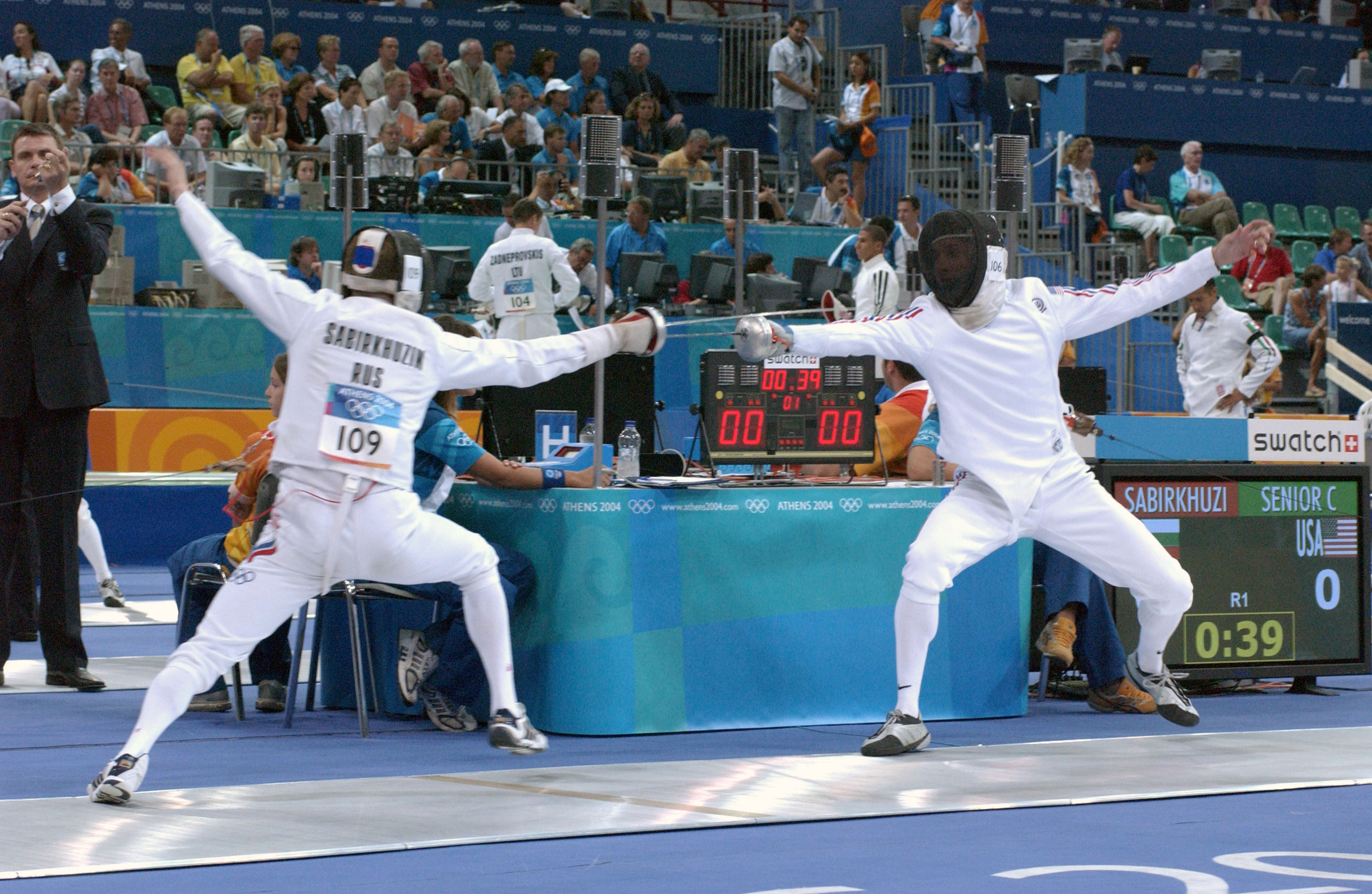
U.S. Army's World Class Athlete Program, 2004 Summer Olympics.

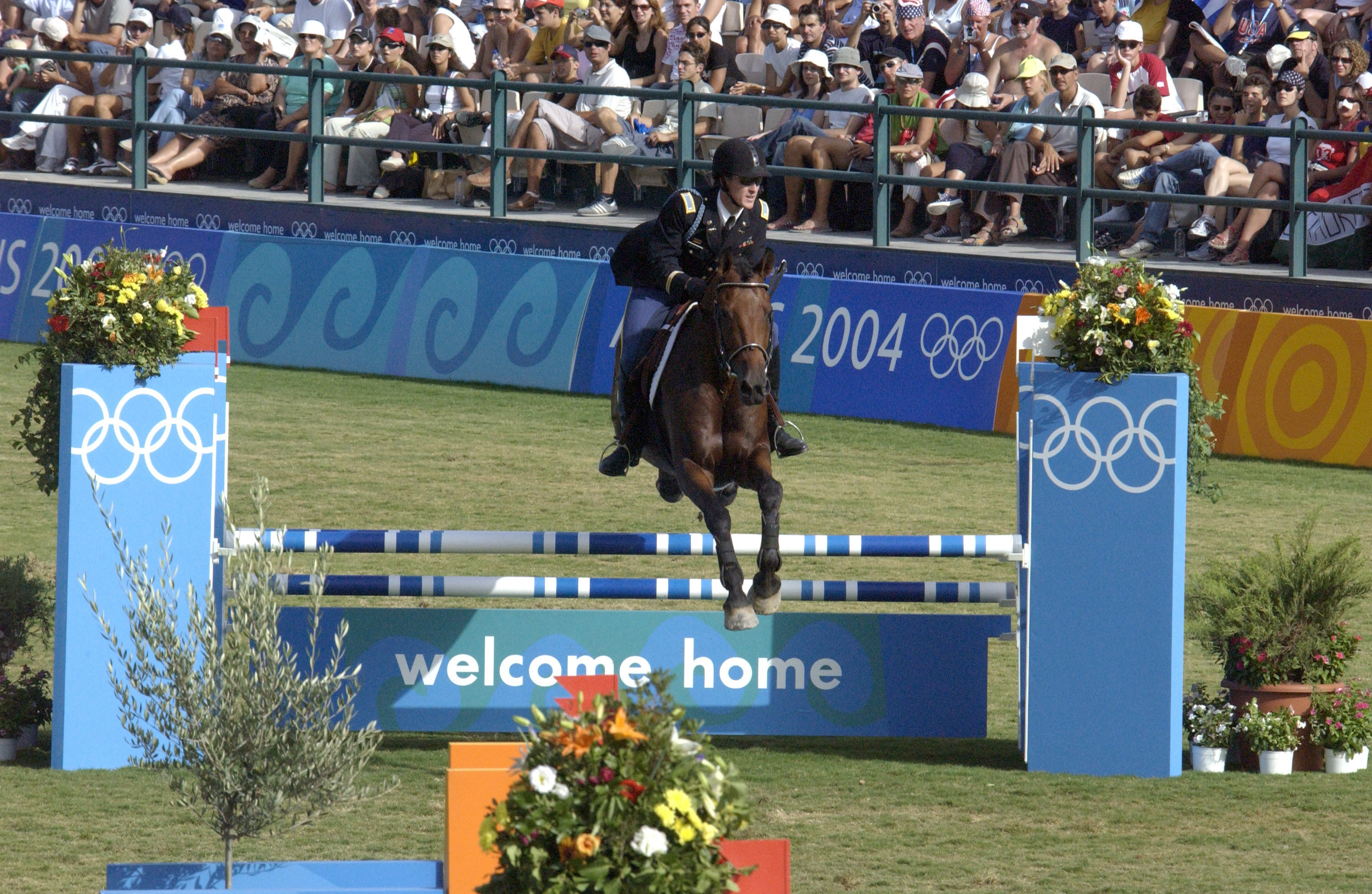
U.S. Army's World Class Athlete Program, 2004 Summer Olympics.

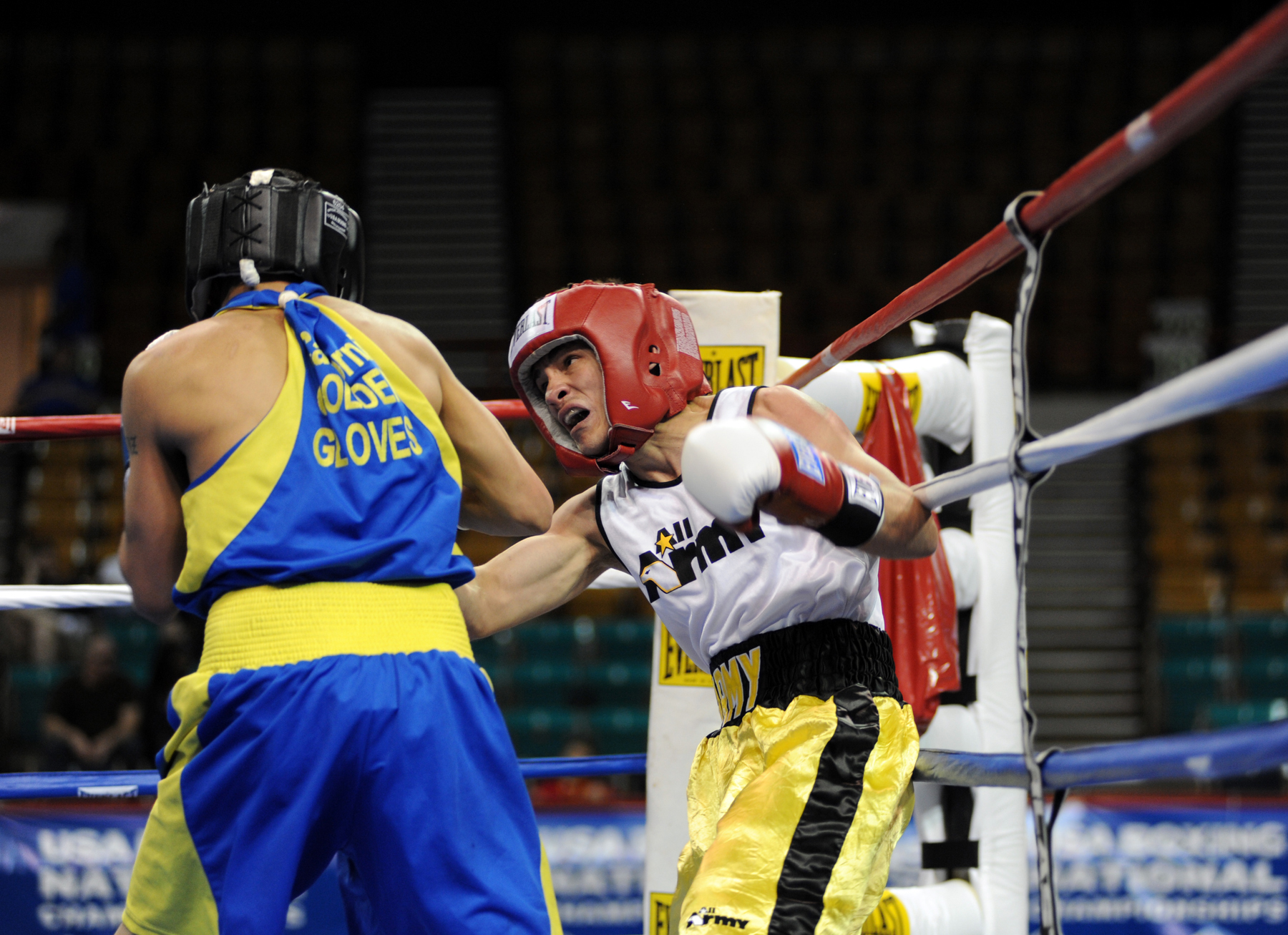
2009 U.S. National Boxing Championships.

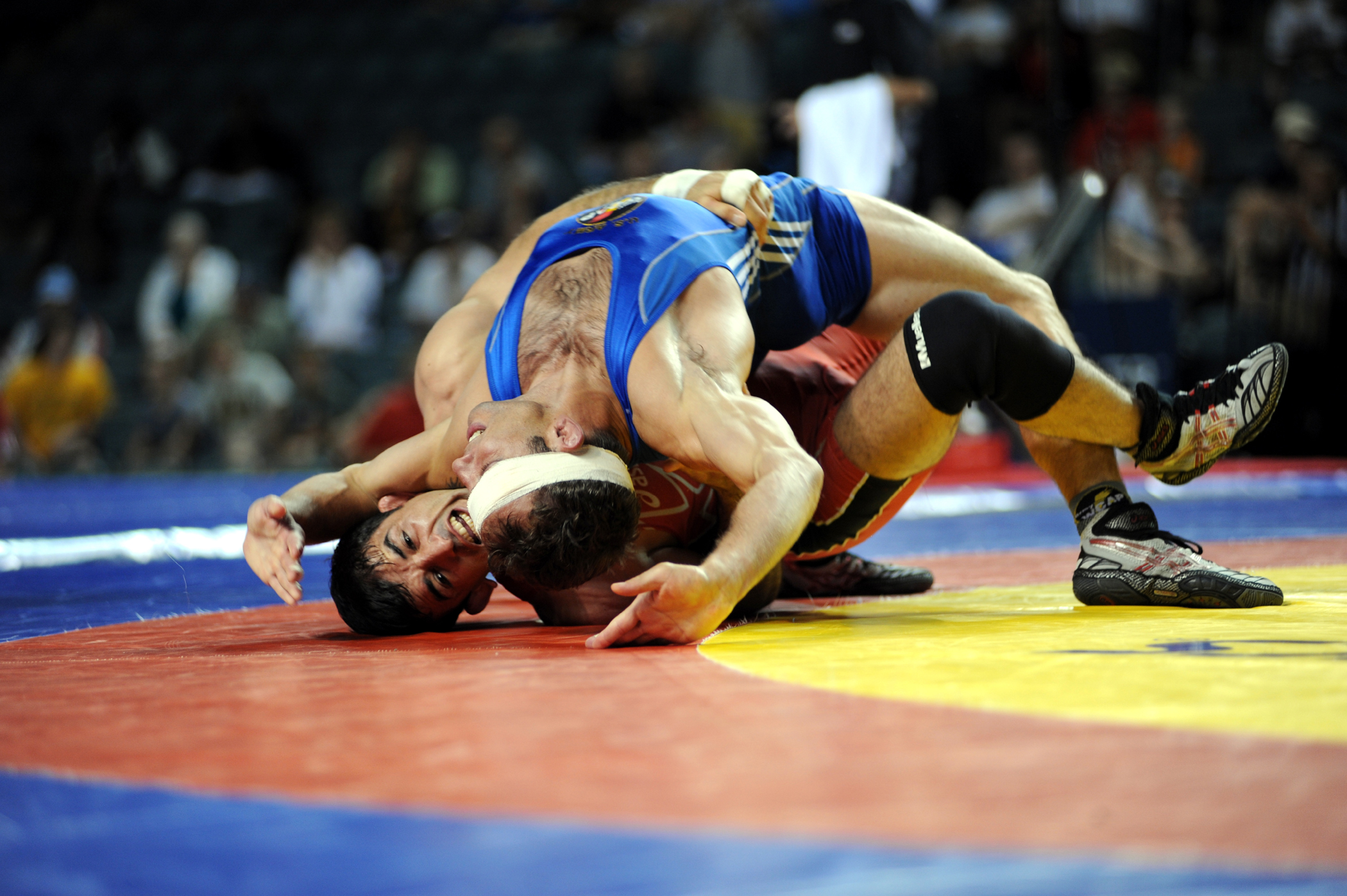
Army World Class Athlete Program, 2010 World Team Trials for USA Wrestling.

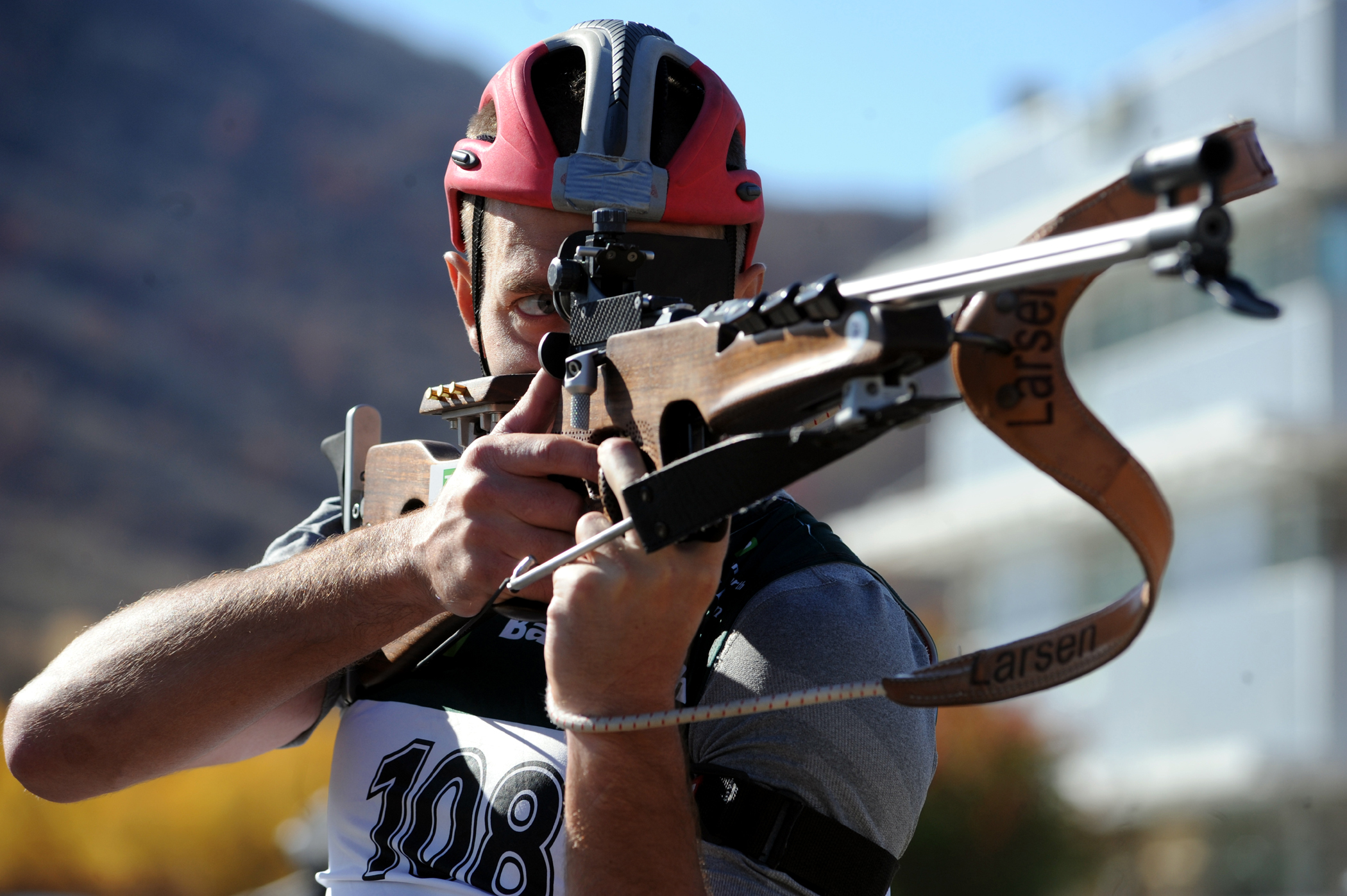
Army World Class Athlete Program Olympic biathlete Jeremy Teela practicing.

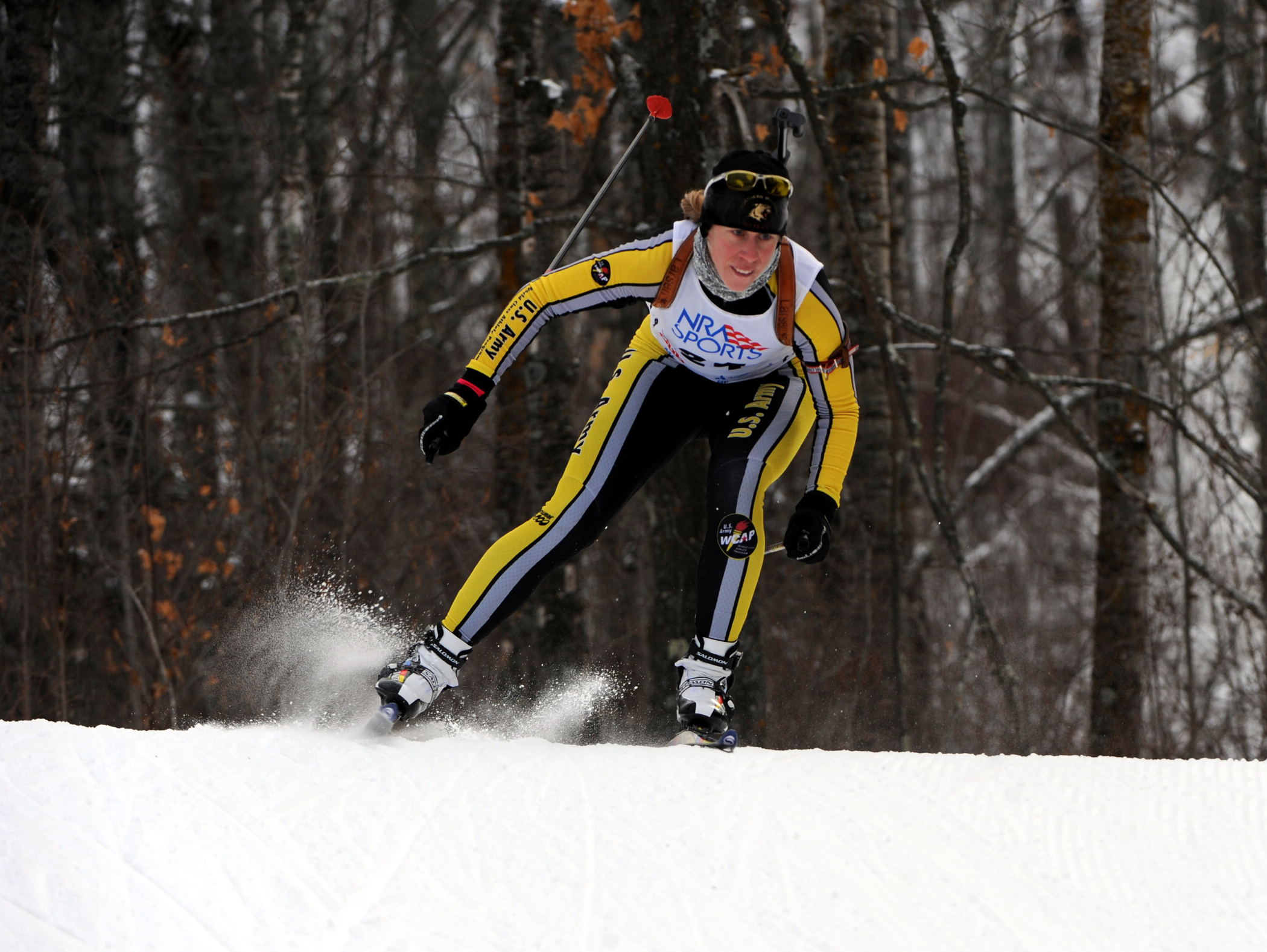
U.S. Biathlon World Team Trials in Coleraine, Minn..

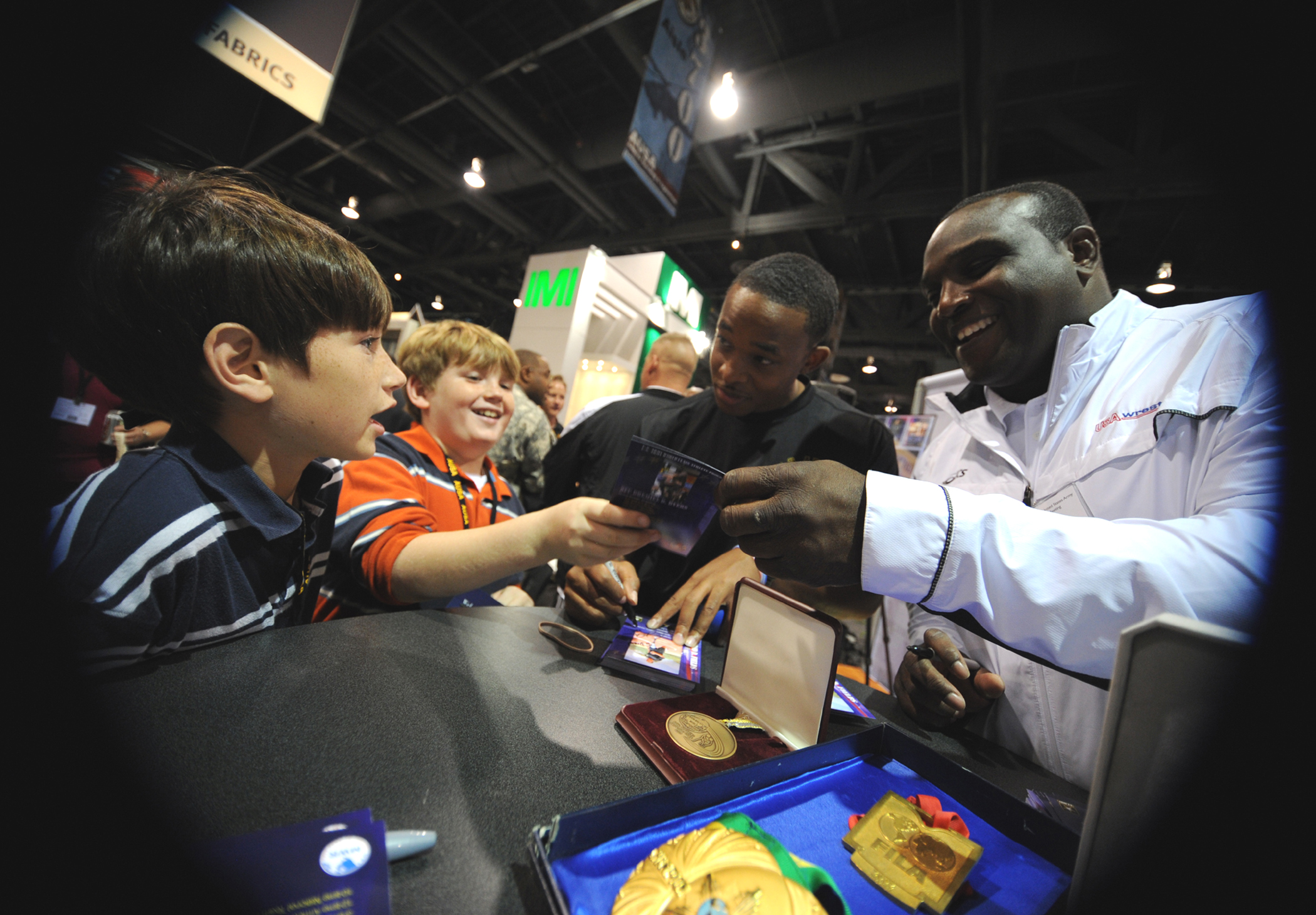
WCAP athletes sign autographs for fans, 2009 AUSA Conference.

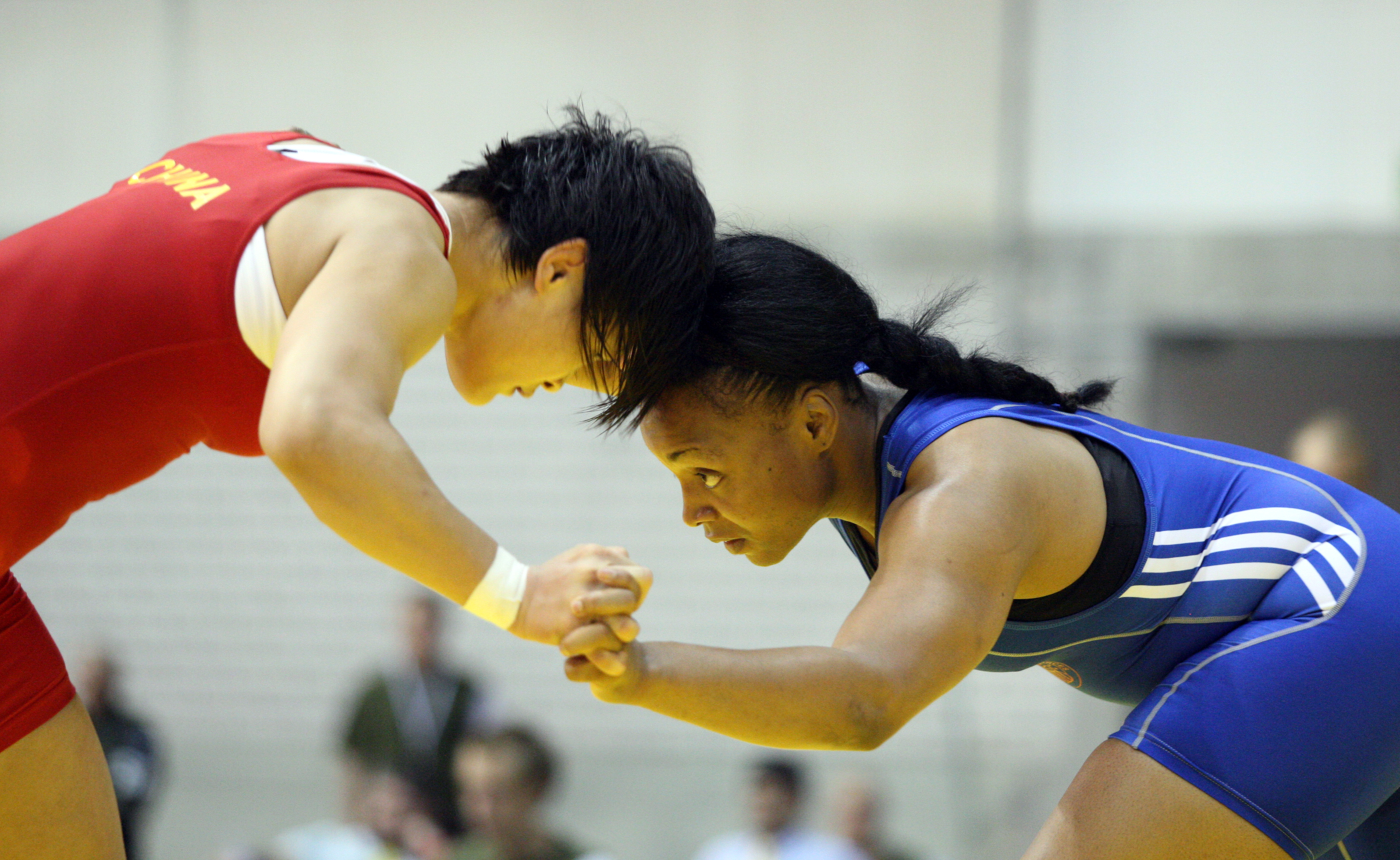
U.S. Army World Class Athlete Program wrestler Sgt. Iris Smith (right) defeats China's Lijun Yang 1-1, 0–1, 3-0 en route to winning the gold medal in the women's 72-kilogram/158.5-pound freestyle division 14 Aug. at the 27th World Military Wrestling Championships in Lahti, Finland.

== MG Robert M. Joyce FMWR School ==
The Installation Management Academy is a full-fledged brick and mortar institution of professional learning and career development, featuring the Maj. Gen. Robert M. Joyce Family and MWR School. The school includes numerous subject matter experts in various areas of U.S. Army Family and Morale, Welfare and Recreation Activities. Nearly 100 courses are offered through online or classroom formats. Recently, 39 courses have received college credit recommendations from the American Council on Education (ACE) and graduates are increasingly transferring them to colleges and universities to receive college credits. Since its inception, employees have completed over 28,400 courses in various Family and MWR program areas.

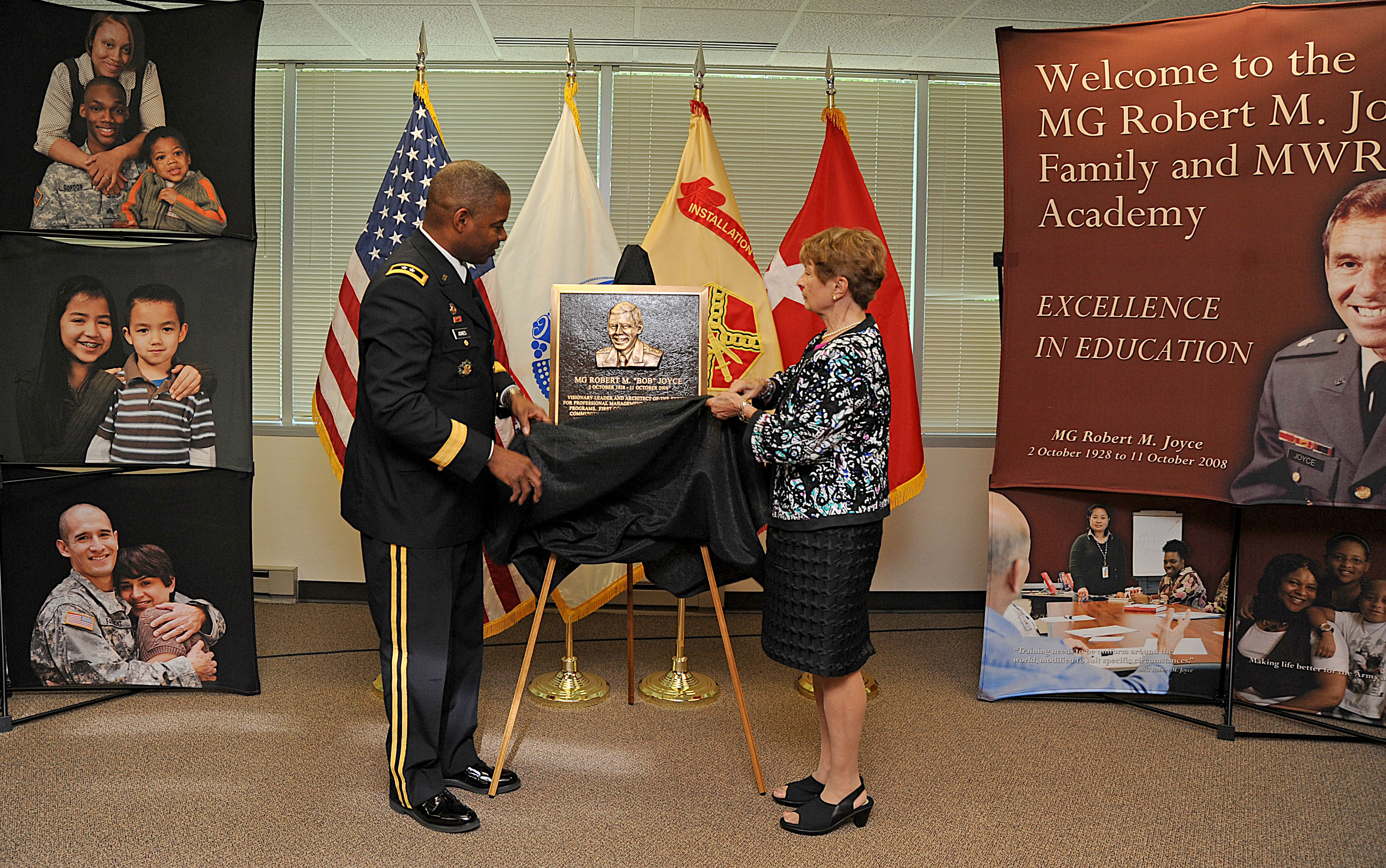
Maj. Gen. Reuben Jones and Virginia "Ginny" Joyce unveil the plaque commemorating the newly named Maj. Gen. Robert M. Joyce Family and MWR Academy at a ceremony 27 May 2010.

In May 2010 the Family and MWR Academy was renamed the MG Robert M. Joyce Family and MWR Academy in honor of the first Commander of the Community and Family Support Center. MG Joyce was instrumental in the founding of the academy and the inspired vision of a professional and developed workforce. Following the transition from a headquarters in Alexandria, Va., to San Antonio, Texas, The academy became the Maj. Gen. Robert M. Joyce Family and MWR School within the Installation Management Academy.

On 7 April 1986 the Commanding General of Community and Family Support Center (CFSC) tasked Colonel Perkins, as Chief of Field Operations, to review training within MWR and its programs throughout the Army. The focus of the review was to identify the system's currently available training, specify its shortfalls, determine the optimum training program, and project the estimated resources necessary to fund an improved program. The ultimate qualifier to apply to the review was "What is best for the Army."

Upon completion of Colonel Perkins' task, a Master Training Concept was developed and approved, and the MWR Academy was launched. A graphical representation of the Master Training Concept was defined in terms of a pyramid. The Master Training Concept was designed to integrate all levels of training and all programs for training, and ensure availability of training to the workforce.

The Master Training Concept is still applicable today. This plan, in conjunction with the Army Civilian Training, Education and Development System (ACTEDS) Plan for Career Field 51 (MWR) forms the basis of the Family and MWR Academy's curriculum. Together, these guidelines provide a structured, progressive, and sequential approach to Family and MWR employee development and training for entry-level through executive-management positions.

The Family and MWR School is also an Authorized Provider (AP) of Continuing Education Units (CEUs) from the American National Standards Institute (ANSI)/ International Association for Continuing Education and Training (IACET). All Family and MWR-sponsored courses are reviewed for their compliance with ANSI/IACET standards and receive CEUs.

Since the academy's inception, over 28,400 family and MWR employees have been trained in various Family and MWR program areas and at various levels.

== Funding categories ==
=== Category A: Mission-sustaining programs ===
Considered essential to sustaining readiness, these programs generally enhance and promote the physical and mental well-being of soldiers. Programs in this category have little or no capacity for generating Non-appropriated Fund (NAF) income and are supported almost entirely with funds appropriated by the U.S. Congress (APF).

=== Category B: Community support programs ===
These programs are closely related, in terms of supporting the military mission, to those grouped in category A. They satisfy the basic physiological and psychological needs of Soldiers and their Families and provide, to the extent possible, the community support systems that make military garrisons temporary hometowns for a mobile military population. These support programs will receive substantial amounts of APF support, but differ from those programs in category A, in part because of their ability to generate NAF revenues. That ability to generate revenues is limited, however, and in no case may they be sustained without substantial APF support.

=== Category C: Revenue-generating programs ===
These programs have less impact on readiness. They offer desirable social and recreational opportunities. Programs in this category have the capability of generating enough income to cover most of their operating expenses, but they lack the ability to sustain themselves based purely on their business activity; consequently, they receive limited APF support. Chapter 5 addresses funding for category C MWR programs located at remote and isolated sites, funding for base closures, and funding as a result of special security conditions.

== Nonappropriated Fund Instrumentalities (NAFI) ==
Every NAFI is legally constituted as an "instrumentality of the United States." The term "NAFI" includes entities at the garrison level, also referred to as garrison MWR operating entities or simply entities (previously the installation MWR fund). Funds in NAFI/entity accounts are Government funds, and NAF property, including buildings, is Government property. However, NAFs are separate from APFs of the U.S. Treasury. They are not commingled with APFs and are managed separately, even when supporting a common program.

Each NAFI/entity operates under the authority of the U.S. Government in accordance with applicable Federal laws and departmental regulations. Because NAFIs/entities operate under the authority of the Federal Government, they are entitled to the same sovereign privileges and immunities as the Federal Government accorded by Federal law.

Applicable DOD directives and implementing Army regulations are binding on NAFIs. NAFI/entity programs and facilities are operated, maintained, and funded as part of the U.S. Army's personnel and readiness program.
