= Ball Park Franks =

American brand of hot dogs

- Current owner: Tyson Foods
- Country: United States
- Introduced: 1958
- Related brands: Jimmy Dean, Hillshire Farm, Kahn's, Bryan
- Previous owners: Hygrade Food Products
- Website: www.ballparkbrand.com

Ball Park Franks is an American brand of hot dog and hamburger buns and patties made by Tyson Foods and popularized in 1958 by the Detroit Tigers of Major League Baseball. Ball Park Frank is the most consumed hot dog in America with 91.04 million consumers in 2020. In 2024, Ball Park Franks were the leading selling refrigerated frankfurter with US$222.37 million in sales, second behind was Oscar Mayer with US$136.88 million in sales.

== History ==
In 1957, Hygrade Food Products, a Detroit-based meatpacking company owned by the Slotkin family, under the direction of Hugo Slotkin, acquired the exclusive contract to supply hot dogs at Detroit's Tiger Stadium (then known as Briggs Stadium). In response, a Hygrade sausage maker, Gus Hauff, developed a specific formulation, incorporating veal and a finer emulsion, creating a larger, one-eighth-pound hot dog, in contrast to the park's previous one-tenth-pound offerings. The product's popularity at the stadium facilitated its subsequent commercial distribution in 1959 as "Ball Park Franks". The name's origin is subject to differing accounts, with attribution given to either saleswoman Mary Ann Kurk or salesman Bill Willtsie. In 1965, the company's tagline, "They plump when you cook them", was developed by the W.B. Doner agency, and the product was launched nationally.

In 1985, Cincinnati schoolteacher Bob Wood visited every major league park, rating each on its hot dogs. In his 1989 book, Dodger Dogs to Fenway Franks: and All the Wieners in Between, Wood ranked the Ball Park Frank at #1, citing that "A ballpark frank with a little mustard on the stick is a dream fulfilled. And proof that worthy experiences never die in the tradition of a fine baseball park."

Sara Lee acquired Hygrade from Hanson Industries in 1989. In 2014, Tyson Foods acquired Hillshire Brands, the corporation formerly known as the Sara Lee Corporation, and with it, the Ball Park Franks brand.

== Varieties ==
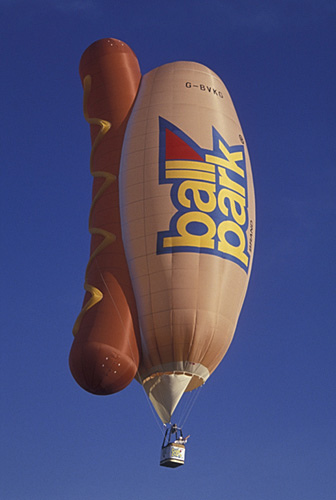
Advertisement for Ball Park Franks on a hot air balloon.

Ball Park franks currently come in the following varieties:

- Prime Beef Franks
- Angus Beef Franks
- Beef Franks
- Classic Franks
- Turkey Franks
