= John Tyson =

John Tyson may refer to:

- John J. Tyson (born 1947), professor in biological sciences at Virginia Tech
- John Baird Tyson (1928–2014), educator and explorer in the Himalayas
- John W. Tyson (died 1967), American businessman, founder of Tyson Foods
- John H. Tyson (born 1953), chairman and heir to Tyson Foods
- John M. Tyson (born 1953), North Carolina Court of Appeals Judge
- John R. Tyson (1856–1923), United States Representative from Alabama
- John R. Tyson (born 1990), director at Tyson Foods
- John Tyson Wigan (1872–1952), British politician and army officer
- John C. Tyson (librarian) (1951–1995), African-American State Librarian of Virginia
- John C. Tyson (judge) (1926–2012), American jurist
- John A. Tyson (1873–1971), judge of the United States Tax Court
- John A. Tyson (born 1982), professor of art history at the University of Massachusetts
