= John R. Tyson (businessman) =

American businessman (born 1990)

- Born: John Randal Tyson; March 9, 1990 (age 36)
- Education: Harvard University (BA); Stanford Graduate School of Business (MBA)
- Employer: Tyson Foods
- Title: Director, Tyson Foods
- Criminal charges: DWI; Criminal trespassing Public intoxication
- Father: John H. Tyson
- Relatives: Donald J. Tyson (grandfather); John W. Tyson (great-grandfather)

John Randal Tyson (born March 9, 1990) is an American businessman who was appointed to the Tyson Foods (NYSE:TSN) board of directors in May 2025. He previously served as the executive vice president and chief financial officer (CFO) at Tyson Foods from 2022 to 2024 and as its chief sustainability officer from 2019 to 2022.

== Early life ==
John R. Tyson was born on March 9, 1990. He is the son of businessman and Tyson Foods chairman John H. Tyson and great-grandson of John W. Tyson, the founder of Tyson Foods. He has one sister, Olivia.

He received a bachelor's degree in economics and psychology at Harvard University and a Master of business administration from the Stanford Graduate School of Business in 2018.

== Work ==
John Randal Tyson began his career in investment banking for JPMorgan Chase and then worked as a private equity and venture capital investor before joining Tyson Foods. He was also a lecturer at the Sam M. Walton College of Business at the University of Arkansas.

Tyson has been involved in the family business from a young age, and always planned to return to the business.

In 2019, Tyson became the chief sustainability officer (CSO) of Tyson Foods, succeeding Justin Whitmore.

Tyson was promoted to executive vice president and chief financial officer of Tyson Foods in September 2022, succeeding Stewart Glendinning, effective October 2022.

After being arrested in 2022, he addressed the incident during a November earnings call. It was reported that CEO Donnie King assured reporters and board members an internal governance review would be undertaken in response to the incident. He was removed from his position as chief financial officer in 2024 following a second alcohol related incident. Curt Calaway succeeded Tyson as interim CFO.

After his removal, Tyson was transitioned to a senior vice president position, and served in this role until May 2025, when he was appointed as a director of the board, overseeing the strategy and acquisitions and technology committees.

In fiscal year 2023, he received $2.9 million in total pay, including a base salary of $650,000 in addition to about $2 million in stock options, according to securities filings. In 2024, it was reported he received an annual base salary of $200,000.

In November 2025, Tyson joined the Arkansas Cinema Society's board of directors.

He is the fourth-generation in the Tyson Foods family dynasty to serve in a leadership capacity at the company.

== Criminal prosecution ==
On November 6, 2022, Tyson was found asleep in the bed in a stranger's home in Fayetteville, Arkansas. Tyson was arrested and charged with criminal trespassing and public intoxication. He made several public apologies and sought treatment in November, 2022. Tyson pleaded guilty to the charges in January 2023.

On June 13, 2024, Tyson was suspended from his position as CFO of Tyson Foods after he was arrested by University of Arkansas police in Fayetteville, for drunk driving. He accepted a plea deal and was required to complete community service and pay a fee.

== See also ==
- List of Harvard University people
- List of people from Arkansas
- List of Stanford University alumni
- List of University of Arkansas people
