= Jack Stephens Center =

Arena in Little Rock, Arkansas

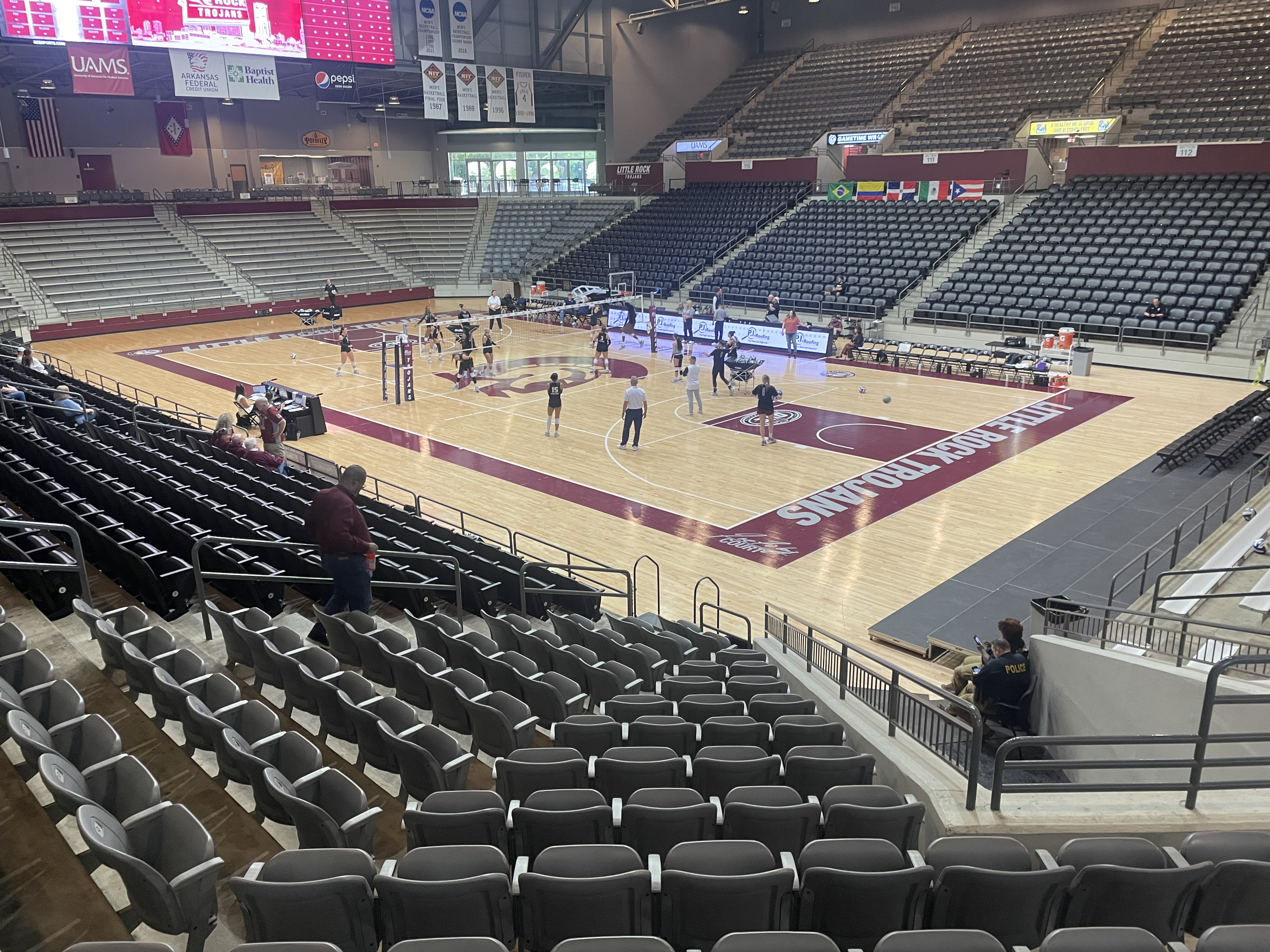
- Interactive map of Jack Stephens Center
- Location: 2801 South University; Little Rock, AR 72204
- Coordinates: 34°43′40″N 92°20′23″W
- Owner: University of Arkansas at Little Rock
- Operator: University of Arkansas at Little Rock
- Capacity: 5,600
- Surface: Hardwood

Construction
- Groundbreaking: February 9, 2004
- Opened: November 1, 2005
- Cost: $25 million ($41.2 million in 2025 dollars)
- Architects: HKS, Inc. Witsell, Evans, Rasco
- General contractors: CDI Contractors, LLC

Tenants
- Little Rock Trojans basketball and volleyball Little Rock Lightning (TBL) (2022–present)

Jack Stephens Center is a 5,600-seat multi-purpose arena on the campus of the University of Arkansas at Little Rock in Little Rock, Arkansas, United States and was built in 2005. It is home to the school's men's basketball, women's basketball, men's wrestling, and women's volleyball teams, known as the Little Rock Trojans, and named in honor of billionaire philanthropist Jackson T. Stephens, who donated $22.4 million for the construction of the facility. The facility is located on the north end of the University of Arkansas at Little Rock campus, adjacent to the University of Arkansas System Division of Agriculture Cooperative Extension Service State Office.

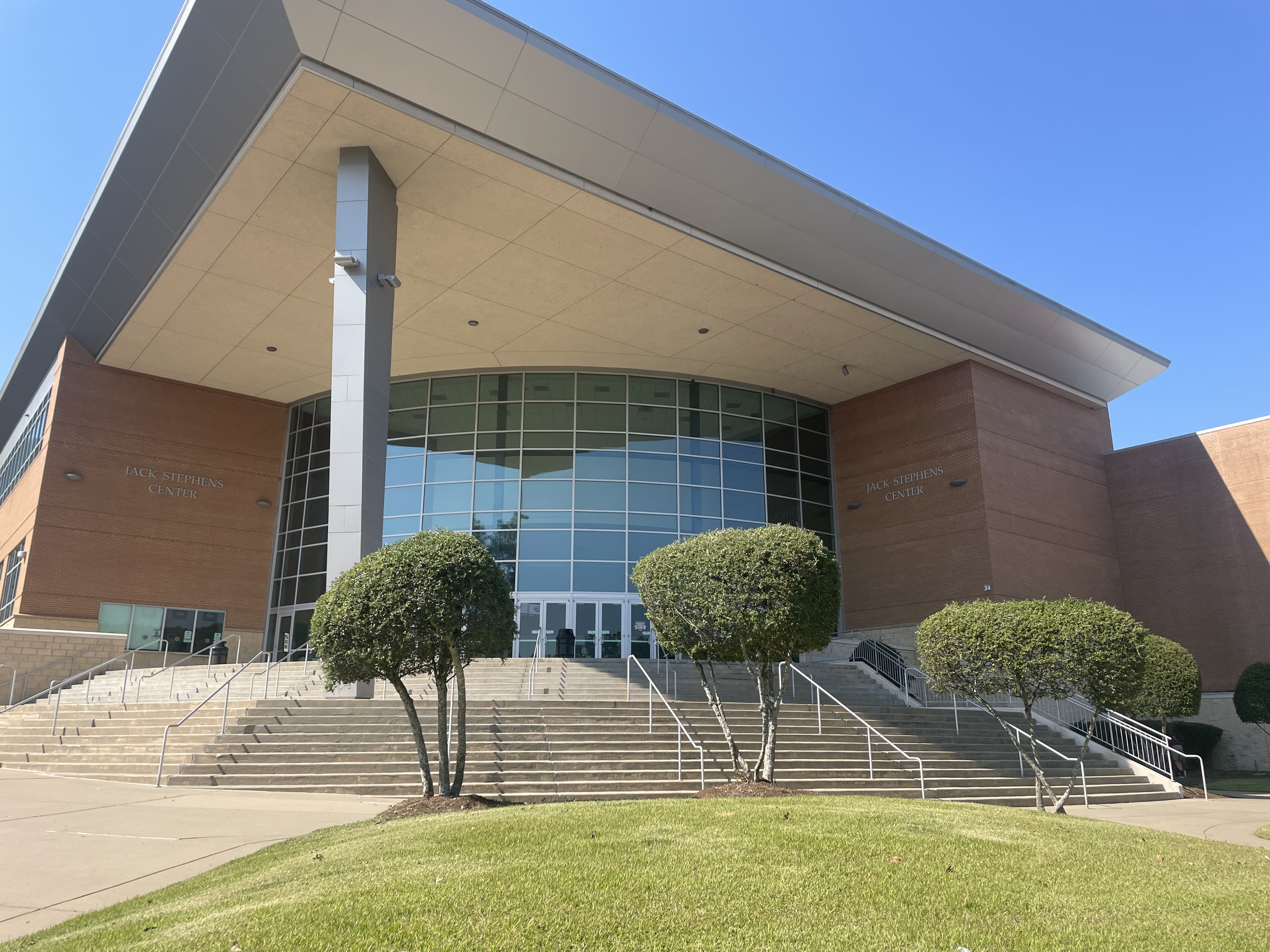
Exterior

It features a full court practice gymnasium, named in honor of former Trojans basketball star Derek Fisher, academic support spaces, a weight room, and training rooms.

The Trojans had previously played in Barton Coliseum, Verizon Arena and the Statehouse Convention Center.

During the COVID-19 pandemic in 2020, the area hosted meetings of the State of Arkansas House of Representatives

== See also ==
- Barton Coliseum
- War Memorial Stadium
- List of NCAA Division I basketball arenas
