= Richard L. Bond =

American businessman

Richard L. Bond is an American businessman. He is the former president and CEO of Tyson Foods.

== Early life ==
Bond graduated from Elizabethtown College, where he received a Bachelor of Science in Business Administration.

== Career ==
He became President of IBP, Inc., a Midwestern hog and cattle slaughtering giant, which was in 2001 acquired by Tyson Foods. He was appointed Co-Chief Operating Officer and Group President of the company's fresh meats and retail divisions, an appointment the Wall Street Journal described as intended to reassure investors, and then became President and Chief Operating Officer in 2003. Bond worked under Don Tyson's son, John H. Tyson, until 2006, when Bond then became CEO. He left Tyson Foods on January 5, 2009, reportedly amidst tensions with Don Tyson. He had reported in November 2008 that Tyson's finances were worsening. Industry observers said that Bond, who has a reputation as a cost cutter, debated with Tyson, who is said to more aggressively seek market share, over whether to cut chicken production to improve prices.

In 2014, Bond joined the Board of Directors of Nutrinsic Corporation.
