= Hillshire Brands =

American food company

- Type: Subsidiary
- Industry: Consumer goods
- Predecessor: Sara Lee Corporation
- Founded: June 29, 2012
- Defunct: July 3, 2014
- Fate: Acquired by Tyson Foods
- Headquarters: Chicago, Illinois, U.S.
- Key people: Sean Connolly (President and CEO)
- Divisions: Jimmy Dean, Ball Park, Hillshire Farm, State Fair, Aidells, Gallo Salame, Sara Lee Frozen Bakery and Chef Pierre Pies, Golden Island Premium Jerky

The Hillshire Brands Company was an American food company based in Chicago, Illinois. Prior to its acquisition by Tyson Foods, the company employed over 9,000 people and generated nearly $4 billion in annual sales.

== History ==
=== Founding and early years ===
Hillshire Brands made its debut on June 29, 2012, after the former Sara Lee Corporation spun off its international coffee and tea division and renamed the remaining units of the company Hillshire Brands. It began trading on the NYSE that same day under the ticker HSH.

Under the terms of the deal, Sara Lee's stock underwent a one-for-five reverse split. As of June 27, 2012, all Sara Lee shareholders saw their holdings transform into Hillshire Brands shares and shrink by a factor of five. In addition, each former Sara Lee shareholder received shares in D.E. Master Blenders 1753 on a one-to-one basis. The company paid out a concurrent $3 special cash dividend on all D.E Master Blenders 1753 shares.

In May 2013 the split was recognized among the six most successful Fortune 500 companies’ spinoffs by Fortune.

During the fiscal year 2013 roughly three quarters of Hillshire's revenues (74%) were generated through retail channels while the foodservice business accounted for 26% of the company's sales.

=== Abandoned merger with Pinnacle Foods ===
In May 2014, Hillshire Brands announced it was buying Pinnacle Foods for US$4.23 billion in a cash and stock deal. Pinnacle Foods brands include Birds Eye, Duncan Hines, Hungry-Man and Swanson frozen TV dinners, among many others. Days later, Pilgrim's Pride threatened the deal with its own bid for Hillshire Brands for $6.4 billion. To complicate matters further, on May 29, 2014, Tyson Foods announced a $6.13 billion cash bid for Hillshire Brands. On June 9, 2014, Hillshire announced it had received a revised bid from Tysons valuing the company at $8.55 billion. Pilgrim's Pride simultaneously announced it had withdrawn its bid.

=== Acquisition by Tyson Foods ===
On June 30, 2014, it was announced that Pinnacle Foods had scrapped its sale to Hillshire Brands, which would allow Hillshire to be acquired by Tyson Foods. Pinnacle would receive a $163 million payment as part of the breakup from Hillshire, and Pinnacle would also receive an expected $25 million in one-time costs connected to the nixed sale.

== Portfolio ==
Hillshire Brands was a manufacturer and marketer of packaged meat and frozen bakery products for the retail and foodservice markets, and a wholly owned subsidiary of Tyson Foods. The company's portfolio of brands included Jimmy Dean, Ball Park, Hillshire Farm, Kahns, State Fair, Sara Lee, Chef Pierre Pies, Aidells, Gallo Salame and Golden Island Premium Jerky.

== See also ==
- List of food companies
