= University of Arkansas System =

Public university system in Arkansas

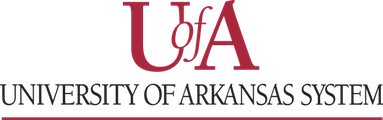
- Type: State university system
- Chairman: John Goodson
- President: Jay B. Silveria
- Administrative staff: 17,000
- Students: 60,000
- Location: 2404 North University Avenue, Little Rock, Arkansas, United States
- Website: uasys.edu

University of Arkansas System Locations.

The University of Arkansas System is a state university system in the U.S. state of Arkansas. It comprises six campuses; a medical school; two law schools; a graduate school focused on public service; a historically black college; statewide research, service, and educational units for agriculture, criminal justice, archeology; several community colleges; and a high school. Over 50,000 students are enrolled in over 188 undergraduate, graduate, and professional programs.

Legally, the entire system carries the name Board of Trustees of the University of Arkansas. Nonetheless, to avoid confusion with its flagship campus in Fayetteville, the system usually refers to itself as the University of Arkansas System and the Fayetteville campus usually refers to itself as the University of Arkansas.

== History ==
The original and flagship campus was established in Fayetteville as Arkansas Industrial University in 1871 under the 1862 Morrill Land-Grant Colleges Act. The system now includes both of the state's land-grant colleges, as University of Arkansas at Pine Bluff (UAPB) was later designated as such under the 1890 Morrill Act; it left the system in 1927, but returned in 1972. The Division of Agriculture and UAM's forestry programs also contribute to the system's land-grant mission. The Division of Agriculture includes the statewide Arkansas Agricultural Experiment Station (AAES) and the Cooperative Extension Service (CES). AAES and CES were managed by the dean of the College of Agriculture and Home Economics on the Fayetteville campus until 1959, when the Board of Trustees established the statewide Division of Agriculture as a unit of the U of A System.

The University of Arkansas System as an organized educational alliance (system) could be said to date from the founding of UAPB (1873) or perhaps UAMS joining the system (1911). The Division of Agriculture was established in 1959 as a statewide system unit with its own line-item appropriation from the state Legislature. University of Arkansas President David Wiley Mullins, along with the Board of Trustees, brokered a series of mergers in the late 1960s. The Little Rock and Monticello campuses joined the system in 1969 (UALR) and 1971 (UAM), and UAPB returned to the system in 1972. In 1975, a University of Arkansas Board of Trustees policy officially adopted the name "University of Arkansas System" as an alternative identification for the system, along with the present names of the campuses, in order to allow the Fayetteville campus to continue its identification as the "University of Arkansas". The policy has been amended over the years as other campuses were added.

In March 2014, the University of Arkansas Board of Trustees created eVersity, a 100% online university aimed to serve students who were unable to access traditional higher education campuses. The University of Arkansas System eVersity was the first and only public, online university in the state of Arkansas. In November 2021, the University of Arkansas System acquired Grantham University, a for-profit online college based in Lenexa, Kansas, for $1 It was renamed the University of Arkansas Grantham, into which eVersity was merged to become one institution. University of Arkansas Grantham now serves as the only 100% online institution for the entire system.

The administrative offices for the University of Arkansas System are located in Little Rock.

=== University presidents ===
Up until 1982, the president was the chief administrative officer of the Fayetteville campus and the University of Arkansas System. In 1982, the position of chancellor was created to be the top administrator at the Fayetteville campus, and the title of president referred only to the University of Arkansas System.

President	Tenure
Noah P. Gates	1871–1873
Albert W. Bishop	1873–1875
Noah P. Gates	1875–1877
Daniel Harvey Hill	1877–1884
George M. Edgar	1884–1887
Edward H. Murfee	1887–1894
John L. Buchanan	1894–1902
Henry S. Hartzog	1902–1905
John N. Tillman	1905–1912
John Hugh Reynolds (acting)	1912–1913
John C. Futrall	1913–1939
J. William Fulbright	1939–1941
Arthur M. Harding	1941–1947
Lewis Webster Jones	1947–1951
John T. Caldwell	1952–1959
Storm Whaley (acting)	1959–1960
David Wiley Mullins	1960–1974
Charles E. Bishop	1974–1980
James E. Martin	1980–1984
Ray Thornton	1984–1990
B. Alan Sugg	1990–2011
Donald R. Bobbitt	2011–2025
Jay B. Silveria	2025–present

== University campuses ==
Campus	Official name	Founded	Enrollment	Endowment	Athletics (nickname)	Division (NCAA)	Primary conference
Grantham	University of Arkansas Grantham	1951	4,427				
Fayetteville	University of Arkansas	1871	30,936	$1.7 billion	Razorbacks	Division I (FBS)	Southeastern (SEC)
Little Rock	University of Arkansas at Little Rock	1927	8,103	$136 million	Trojans	Division I (non-football)	United (UAC)
Monticello	University of Arkansas at Monticello	1910	3,762	$22.8 million	Boll Weevils	Division II	Great American (GAC)
Pine Bluff	University of Arkansas at Pine Bluff	1873	3,332	$1.9 million	Golden Lions	Division I (FCS)	Southwestern (SWAC)
Fort Smith	University of Arkansas at Fort Smith	1928	7,329	$38.8 million	Lions	Division II	Mid-America (MIAA)

== Medical school ==
Location	Official name	Affiliated campuses	Founded	Enrollment	Endowment
Little Rock	University of Arkansas for Medical Sciences	Fayetteville	1879	2,907	$75.9 million

== Law schools ==
(Neither one is officially independent of its parent campus, though the Bowen School of Law is on a separate campus from UALR proper)

Location	Campus	Official name	Founded	Enrollment	Endowment
Fayetteville	University of Arkansas, Fayetteville	University of Arkansas School of Law	1924	445	$84.2 million
Little Rock	University of Arkansas at Little Rock	William H. Bowen School of Law	1975	450	$43.4 million

== Graduate school ==
Location	Campus	Official name	Founded	Enrollment	Endowment
Little Rock	Independent	University of Arkansas Clinton School of Public Service	2004	96	$0.00 million

== Community colleges ==
Location	Campus	Preferred name	Founded	Enrollment	Athletics
De Queen	Cossatot Community College of the University of Arkansas	UA Cossatot (CCCUA)	1975	1,486	Bi-State Conference (NJCAA)
Batesville	University of Arkansas Community College at Batesville	UACC Batesville	1997	1,745	N/A
Hope	University of Arkansas Hope-Texarkana	UAHT	1965	1,358	N/A
Morrilton	University of Arkansas Community College at Morrilton	UACC Morilton	1961	N/A	
Helena-West Helena	Phillips Community College of the University of Arkansas	Phillips	1965	2,350	Bi-State Conference (NJCAA)
North Little Rock	University of Arkansas – Pulaski Technical College	Pulaski Tech	1945	6,576	N/A
Mena	University of Arkansas Rich Mountain	UA Rich Mountain	1973	824	Bi-State Conference (NJCAA)
Forrest City	East Arkansas Community College	UA EACC	1974	1,255	N/A
Harrison	North Arkansas College	UA Northark	1974	1,977	Bi-State Conference (NJCAA)

== Residential high school ==
Location	Campus	Preferred name	Founded	Enrollment
Hot Springs	Arkansas School for Mathematics, Sciences, and the Arts	ASMSA	1991	250

== Other system units ==
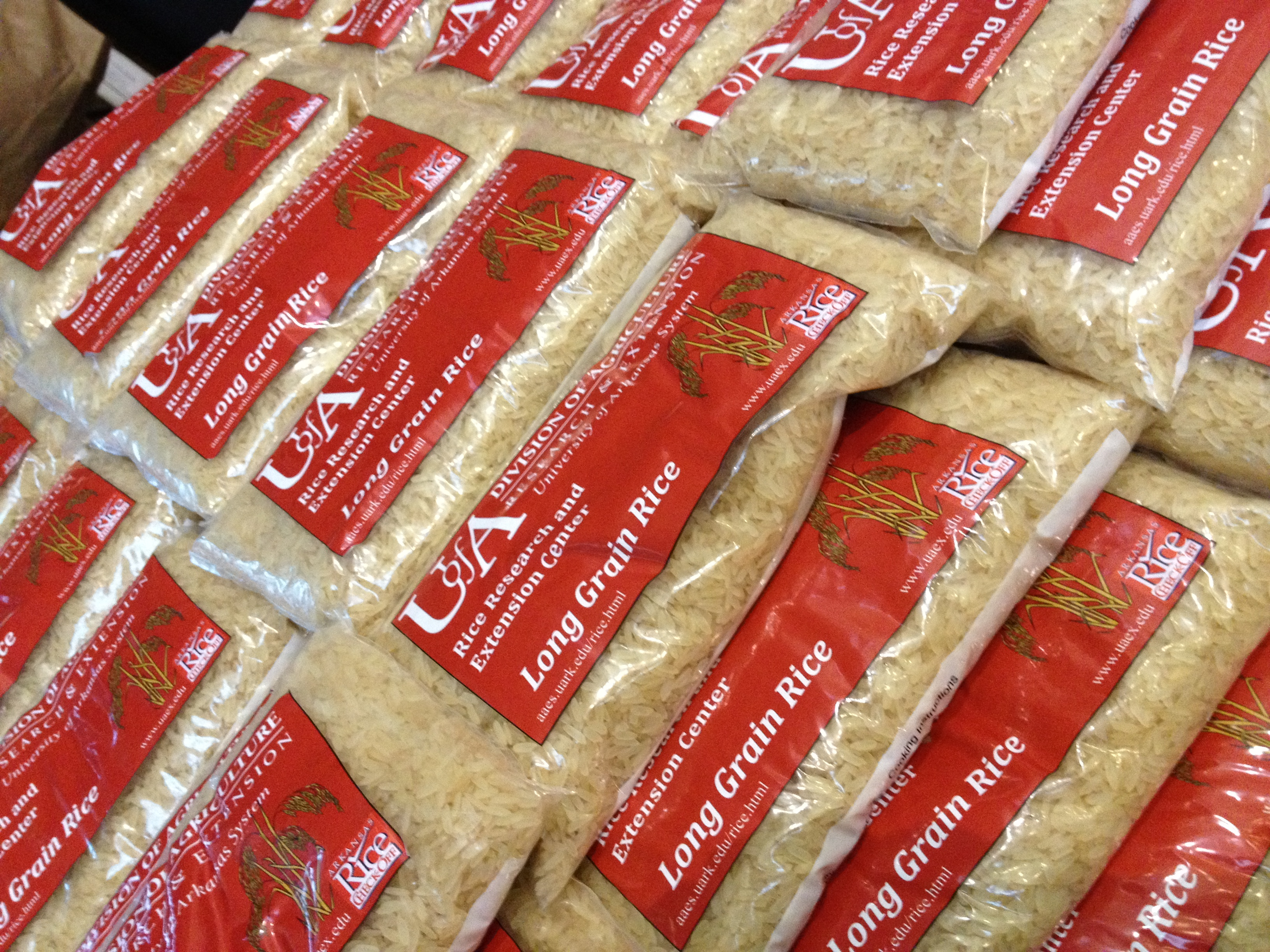
Bags of long grain rice from the UA Division of Agriculture Research and Extension - Rice Research and Extension Center

- Cammack Campus, site of the system headquarters in Little Rock
- University of Arkansas System Division of Agriculture
  - Arkansas Agricultural Experiment Station
  - Cooperative Extension Service
- Arkansas Archeological Survey
- Criminal Justice Institute, University of Arkansas System
- Winthrop Rockefeller Institute
