= Sara Lee Corporation =

Defunct American consumer good company

- Type: Private
- Traded as: NYSE: SLE
- Industry: Consumer goods
- Founded: 1939; 87 years ago
- Defunct: 2012
- Fate: Split
- Successors: Hillshire Brands; D.E Master Blenders 1753; Grupo Bimbo
- Headquarters: Chicago, Illinois, U.S.
- Key people: Jan Bennink (chairman); Marcel Smits (CEO)
- Products: Food, beverage, and household and body care products

The Sara Lee Corporation was an American consumer-goods company based in Downers Grove, Illinois. The Sara Lee name was used on a number of frozen and packaged foods, often known for the long-running slogan "Everybody doesn't like something, but nobody doesn't like Sara Lee".

In 2005, Sara Lee Corporation had operations in more than 40 countries; sold food, beverage, and household products in over 180 countries; and had some 137,000 employees worldwide. In 2005, Sara Lee Corporation was split into two companies: one for North American operations renamed Hillshire Brands, which continued to use the Sara Lee name on bakery and certain deli products, and the other for international beverage and bakery businesses that was named D.E Master Blenders 1753. Hillshire Brands was acquired by Tyson Foods in 2014.

In 2018, Tyson Foods sold the Sara Lee brand and product line to private investment firm Kohlberg & Company.

== History ==
In 1935, Charles Lubin and his brother-in-law, Arthur Gordon, bought a small chain of Chicago neighborhood bakeries called Community Bake Shops. Working together, the businessmen expanded their original three stores into a chain of seven bakeries. Lubin wanted to expand the business. He named a cream cheesecake after his eight-year-old daughter, Sara Lee Lubin, and changed the name of the business to Kitchens of Sara Lee.

In 1956, the Consolidated Foods Corporation bought Kitchens of Sara Lee, and it became one of the company's best-known brand names. In 1985, the name Sara Lee Corporation was adopted for the corporation as a whole. While the company traced its lineage to 1939, when Nathan Cummings acquired C. D. Kenny Company, a wholesale distributor of sugar, coffee, and tea in Baltimore, Consolidated Foods Corporation was actually the descendant of a Chicago grocery store called Sprague, Warner & Company. This enterprise, which started on State Street in Chicago, was founded during the Civil War by Albert A. Sprague and Ezra J. Warner. By 1909, Sprague, Warner & Company was one of the leading wholesale grocery companies in the United States, famous for house brands such as Richelieu, Ferndell, and Batavia. In 1942, this company was acquired by the Canadian-born Cummings. The new Chicago-based company, at first called Sprague Warner–Kenny Corp., ranked as the largest grocery wholesaler in the United States. Annual sales grew from about $20 million in 1942 to $120 million by 1946. After changing its name in 1945 to Consolidated Grocers, Cummings's company became the Consolidated Foods Corporation in 1953.

In 1965, Consolidated Foods acquired Chicken Delight, a fast-food franchise chain then operating approximately 650 locations across the United States and Canada, for approximately $10 million in stock. The company's franchise model, which required franchisees to purchase supplies exclusively from the franchisor in lieu of paying franchise fees, became the subject of a landmark antitrust class action. In Siegel v. Chicken Delight, 448 F.2d 43 (9th Cir. 1971), the United States Court of Appeals for the Ninth Circuit ruled the arrangement an unlawful tying arrangement under the Sherman Act — a decision widely cited in subsequent franchise antitrust law. Consolidated wrote off its investment in fiscal 1971, settled with 927 franchisees for $2.5 million, and sold the trademark in 1972.

In 1986, Sara Lee bought the manufacturing and mail order operations of Wolferman's, a maker of English muffins, that dated back to 1888.

In February 1988, Sara Lee agreed to the purchase of the 84-year-old Adams-Millis Corporation of High Point, North Carolina, the largest private label sock and stocking manufacturer in the United States, with 3000 employees and 1987 sales of nearly $200 million.

On June 25, 2001, Sara Lee Corp pleaded guilty to a misdemeanor and agreed to pay $4.4 million for selling tainted meat that was blamed for at least 15 deaths and six miscarriages in 1998; the agreement stressed that Sara Lee's Bil Mar Foods division did not knowingly distribute the tainted meat. On August 7, 2001, Sara Lee Corp cleared the last remaining regulatory hurdle in its purchase of Earthgrains Co, receiving approval from the European Commission (S).

Brenda C. Barnes joined Sara Lee Corporation in July 2004 as the president and chief operating officer. Then in February 2005, Barnes was named president and chief executive officer, and the corporation announced it would move its headquarters from Cincinnati, Ohio, to Downers Grove, Illinois, which housed the company's North American operating businesses and the majority of Sara Lee's corporate staff.

Also in February 2005, the company began executing a multi-year plan to transform Sara Lee into a company focused on its food, beverage, and household and body care businesses around the world. To support that focus, Sara Lee announced plans to dispose of approximately 40 percent of the company's revenues, including its apparel, European packaged meats, US retail coffee and direct selling businesses. On December 22, 2005, Sara Lee Corporation was to delist from Euronext Amsterdam and Euronext Paris stock exchanges, as well as the Swiss Exchange. The company said it was taking the voluntary step due to low trading volumes on those exchanges.

2005 also saw the debut of Sara Lee Soft & Smooth made with whole grain white bread. In October, Barnes succeeded C. Steven McMillan as chairman. The year ended with the sale of the direct selling business to Tupperware.

In 2006, Sara Lee announced a new company wide campaign: "the joy of eating". The campaign was part of a restructuring at Sara Lee.

2006 featured the divestiture of Sara Lee's European meats and European branded apparel businesses. In addition, the corporation spun off to its shareholders the branded apparel, Americas/Asia, business, into a separate, publicly traded company called Hanesbrands Inc.

Including the spin-off, Sara Lee raised more than $3.7 billion in proceeds as part of the company's transformation plan. In addition to the monetary benefits, the company became tightly focused on its core businesses: food, beverage, and household and body care. In 2008, Sara Lee sold off its Direct Store Delivery foodservice coffee business to Farmer Brothers for a reported $45 million.

By 2009, Sara Lee was pursuing the sale of its household and body care business in their continuing effort to focus on core business. In April, Sara Lee launched a state-of-the-art research and development center named The Kitchens of Sara Lee, a 120,000-square-foot (11,000 m^{2}) campus at the company's headquarters in Downers Grove.

On September 25, 2009, Sara Lee announced it accepted a binding offer by Unilever for €1.275 billion to sell its global body care and European detergents business. The transaction was approved by EU regulators in November of the following year.

On November 9, 2010, Sara Lee said that by selling its North American Fresh Bakery unit to Grupo Bimbo, it could grow in other areas. The $959 million deal gave Sara Lee the right to continue using the Sara Lee name on frozen desserts and meat products. Grupo Bimbo was to use the Sara Lee name for fresh-baked products around the world except for Western Europe, Australia and New Zealand. The deal also gave Grupo Bimbo 41 baking plants, and the regional brands Grandma Sycamore's, Heiner's and Rainbo.

On January 28, 2011, Sara Lee announced the company would be split into two units. The company said its North American operations (including Jimmy Dean, Ball Park and Hillshire Farm) would take the Hillshire Brands corporate name, while the international beverage and bakery businesses (including Douwe Egberts, Senseo, Pickwick, Maison du Café, L'OR, Café Pilão, and Marcilla) would constitute a separate unit named D.E Master Blenders 1753. Some analysts said splitting the business into two units would make a takeover more likely. Stockholders would have equal shares in both companies. In the same month, Sara Lee received noted media attention regarding their strategy to "refocus on the core" to revamp the company. In a Forbes magazine column, Adam Hartung stated Sara Lee could not "cost-cut, refocus or re-align a business to success with no new products and no growth plan". Also, Marcel Smits, interim CEO since Barnes suffered a stroke, became the new CEO, and Jan Bennink director and chairman. The split was completed on July 4, 2012.

The successor company, Hillshire Brands, re-located its headquarters from Downers Grove to Chicago in 2012. In 2014, Hillshire, along with the Sara Lee operations, was acquired by Tyson Foods.

In 2015, the United States Equal Employment Opportunity Commission ruled after an investigation that African-American workers at the Sara Lee Corporation plant in Paris, Texas (which had closed in 2011) had been deliberately exposed disproportionately to asbestos, black mold, and other toxins, and also had been targets of racial slurs and racist graffiti.

On June 1, 2018, Tyson announced that it would sell the Sara Lee, Van's, Chef Pierre and Bistro Collection brands to Kohlberg & Company. The sale was completed on August 1, forming Sara Lee Frozen Bakery, based in Oakbrook Terrace, Illinois.

== Brands ==
Food

- Ball Park Franks: hot dogs
- Bryan: meats
- Bryan Foods: meats
- CroustiPâte: bakery, European market
- Deli d'Italia: meats
- Deli Perfect: meats
- Emeril: meats
- Galileo: salame, meats (east coast)
- Gallo Salame: meats (San Francisco, west coast)
- Green Hill: sausage
- Hillshire Farm: meats
- Jimmy Dean: pork sausages and meat products
- Kahn's: meats
- King Cotton: meats
- Mr. Turkey
- Ortiz: bakery
- R.B. Rice: meats
- Rainbo: bakery
- Rudy's Farm: pork sausage and breakfast sandwiches
- Sara Lee: bakery, condiments, deli cheese, deli meats and frozen sweets
- State Fair: corn dogs
- West Virginia Brand: meats

Beverages

- Butter-Nut Cappuccino
- Bravo
- Caboclo
- Café Continental
- Café Damasco
- Café do Ponto
- Café Pilão
- Cafitesse
- Chat Noir
- Cain's Coffee
- Douwe Egberts: coffee, tea
- Harris
- Hornimans
- Jacqmotte
- Java Coast
- Kanis & Gunnink
- Kayo
- Laurentis
- Maison du Café
- Marcilla
- Maryland Club
- Merrild
- Moccona
- Natreen
- Natrena
- Paradise
- Piazza d'Oro
- Pickwick: tea
- Prima
- Seleto
- Senseo: coffee machine and coffee pods
- Soley
- Steamers
- Suntipt
- Van Nelle

=== Divested ===
Sara Lee Corporation announced in 2006 that it had completed the sale of its branded apparel business in Europe to an affiliate of Sun Capital Partners. Such brands included Dim, Playtex, Wonderbra, Lovable, Abanderado, Nur Die, Unno and Bellinda.

Sara Lee Corporation announced on Sept 28, 2009, that it had received a binding offer for its Global Body Care and European Detergents to Unilever for €1.275 billion (equivalent to €1.71 billion in 2023). On June 1, 2010, Sara Lee announced it had completed the sale of its 51 percent stake in its Godrej Sara Lee joint venture to Godrej Consumer Products Ltd. for a total consideration of €185 million (equivalent to €249 million in 2023). On June 15, 2010, the company announced that it had received a binding offer of $153.5 million (equivalent to $221 million in 2025) for its remaining insecticides business. The offer is dependent on European Union antitrust approval; the decision is due May 2, 2011. On July 5, 2010, Sara Lee completed the sale of its Ambi Pur air care business to Procter & Gamble for €320 million (equivalent to €412 million in 2023). On April 4, 2011, Sara Lee completed the sale of its Kiwi shoe care business to SC Johnson for €245 million (equivalent to €315 million in 2023). In 2010, Sara Lee completed the sale of White King and Janola brands to Symex for €38 million (equivalent to €50.3 million in 2023). In addition, Sara Lee announced the pending sale of its non-Indian insecticides business to SC Johnson for €153.5 million.

In 2010, Sara Lee divested its North American fresh bakery business to Grupo Bimbo.

In 2012, Hillshire Brands sold its Australian bakery operations to McCain Foods.

=== Discontinued ===
On November 19, 2008, Sara Lee Corporation, which had acquired "the No. 2 kosher hot dog brand" in 1993, announced that it would close its kosher hot dog and meat processing facility in Chicago, on or before January 30, 2009. Sara Lee decided to exit the kosher meat business and discontinue processing and distributing products made under all of its kosher meat brands, including: Best's Kosher, Sinai Kosher, Shofar and Wilno.

As of early 2019, certain Sara Lee bread and other baked goods products, which had dropped some kosher certifications in 2017, restored them.

== Political issues ==
Throughout 2012, Sara Lee contributed $343,600 (equivalent to $475,561 in 2025) to a $46 million political campaign (equivalent to $63.7 million in 2025) known as "The Coalition Against The Costly Food Labeling Proposition, sponsored by Farmers and Food Producers". This organization was set up to oppose a California citizen's initiative, known as Proposition 37, demanding mandatory labeling of foods containing genetically modified ingredients.

== The Sara Lee Foundation ==
The Sara Lee Foundation was founded in 1981 to formalize Sara Lee's dedication to community services.

== See also ==
- List of Illinois companies
- HanesBrands, a former subsidiary of Sara Lee
