= AAES =

AAES may refer to:

- American Association of Endocrine Surgeons, a professional organization
- American Association of Engineering Societies, an umbrella organization of engineering societies
- Ansett Aviation Engineering Services; see Ansett Australia § John Holland Aviation Services
- Arkansas Agricultural Experiment Station, the research component of the University of Arkansas System's Division of Agriculture
- Australian Army Education Service; see Royal Australian Army Educational Corps
- Anti-Aircraft Experimental Section, part of the British Ministry of Munitions
- Erik Aaes (1899–1966), Danish set designer and art director
