= Tollett =

Tollett is a surname. It may refer to the following notable people:

- Dave Tollett (born 1966), American college baseball coach
- Leland Tollett, American businessman
- Paul Tollett, (born 1965), American music promoter
- Richard Tollett, 16th-century English clergyman
- Tulsen Tollett (born 1973), British rugby player and TV presenter
