= University of Arkansas–Fort Smith =

Public university in Fort Smith, Arkansas, US

Coordinates: 35°23′01″N 94°22′29″W

- Former names: Fort Smith Junior College (1928–1966); Westark Junior College (1966–1972); Westark Community College (1972–1998); Westark College (1998–2001)
- Type: Public university
- Established: 1928; 98 years ago
- Parent institution: University of Arkansas System
- Academic affiliations: Space-grant
- Endowment: $83.7 million (2019)
- Chancellor: Terisa C. Riley
- Faculty: 220
- Students: 5,887 (fall 2022)
- Location: Fort Smith, Arkansas, United States
- Campus: suburban, 168 acres (0.68 km^{2})
- Colors: Navy blue and white
- Nickname: Lions
- Sporting affiliations: NCAA Division II – The MIAA
- Website: uafs.edu
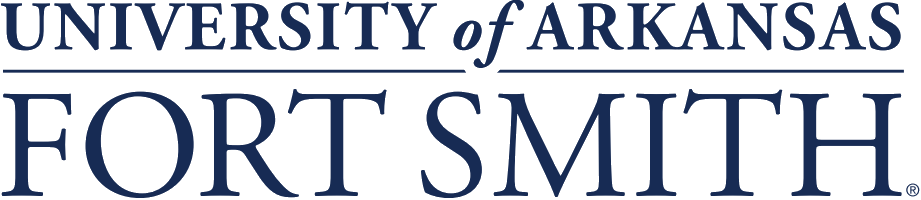

The University of Arkansas–Fort Smith (UAFS) is a public university in Fort Smith, Arkansas, United States. Part of the University of Arkansas System, UAFS is the sixth-largest university in Arkansas with a fall 2020 enrollment of approximately 6,500 students.

The university campus occupies 168 acres (0.68 km^{2}) of an arboretum that has 1,182 GPS-inventoried trees representing 81 species. It offers 62 graduate, bachelor, and associate degree programs and 50 technical and proficiency certificates.

UAFS's athletic teams, the Lady Lions and Lions, compete in NCAA Division II as members of the Mid-America Intercollegiate Athletics Association with five women's teams and five men's teams across ten sports.

== History ==
The University of Arkansas–Fort Smith was established in 1928 as an extension of the public school system in Fort Smith, Arkansas, with the superintendent, James William Ramsey, acting as the college president and the high school principal as dean. Known originally as Fort Smith Junior College, the institution operated within the Fort Smith public school system until 1950, when the school was incorporated as a private, nonprofit institution with its own governing board. In September 1952, the college moved from borrowed facilities in the high school to its current site, initially occupying 15 acres (61,000 m^{2}).

A vocational-technical division was added in 1960. During this period, the college began developing the programs and character of a comprehensive community college—a new concept in Arkansas and across the nation.

In the fall of 1965, the Sebastian County electorate approved the creation of the Sebastian County Community Junior College District, along with a tax levy on the real and personal property of the county. The governor appointed a Board of Trustees, and the school again became a public institution.

In 1966, the institution's name was changed from Fort Smith Junior College to Westark Junior College, and in 1972, to Westark Community College, indicating the larger area to be served and reflecting the more comprehensive mission.

Throughout the 1980s and early 1990s, the college developed and made changes within the context of its mission as a two-year institution. A significant development in 1989 was the establishment of a University Center. Five state universities partnered with the institution to offer six bachelor's and seven master's degree programs on campus. Between 1989 and 2002, 1,788 students graduated with bachelor's degrees through the University Center.

In 1997, the Arkansas Legislature passed an act granting Westark the authority to offer in its own right up to nine applied bachelor's degrees, developed in response to identified needs of the industries in the area served.

The name of the college was changed yet again in February 1998 to Westark College. On December 15, 2000, the Board of Trustees of Westark College entered into an agreement with the Board of Trustees of the University of Arkansas to merge with the University of Arkansas System as a four-year institution. In 2001, the Sebastian County electorate voted to support the merger. A formal request to change affiliation status to that of a bachelor's degree-granting institution under the name of the University of Arkansas–Fort Smith was submitted to the Higher Learning Commission in August 2001 and approved by the Institutional Actions Council on November 19, 2001.

The merger, which became official on January 1, 2002, endorsed the concept of UAFS as a unique university, one that offers applied and traditional baccalaureate degree programs, one- and two-year associate and technical programs, and non-credit business and industry training programs.

== Colleges ==
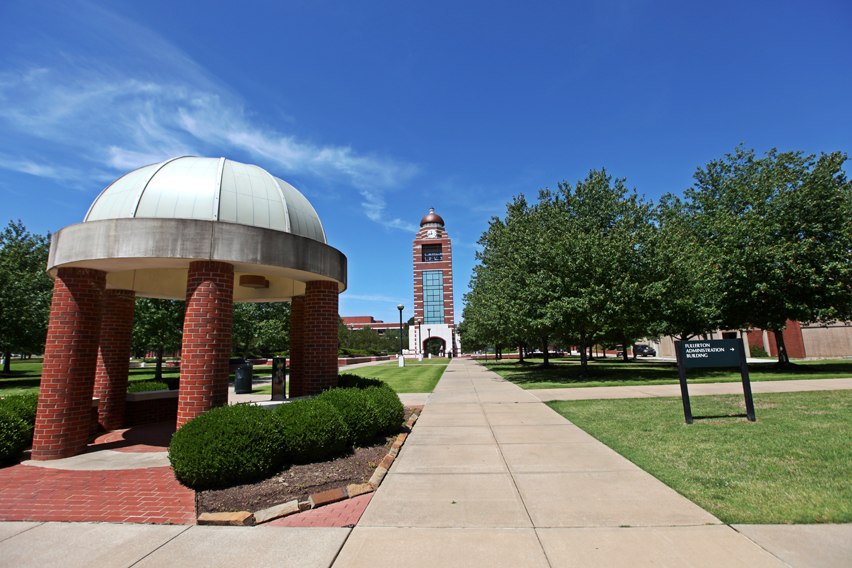
Bell Tower and Greens

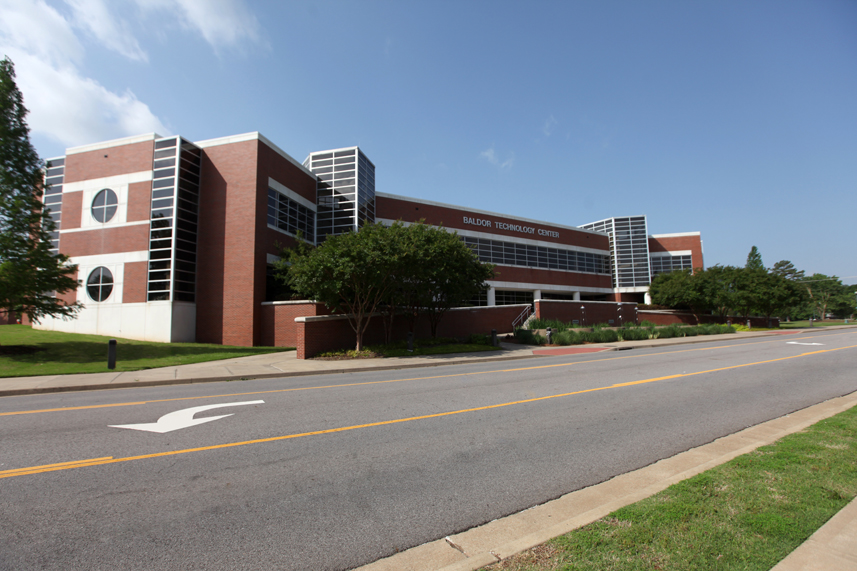
Baldor Technology Center

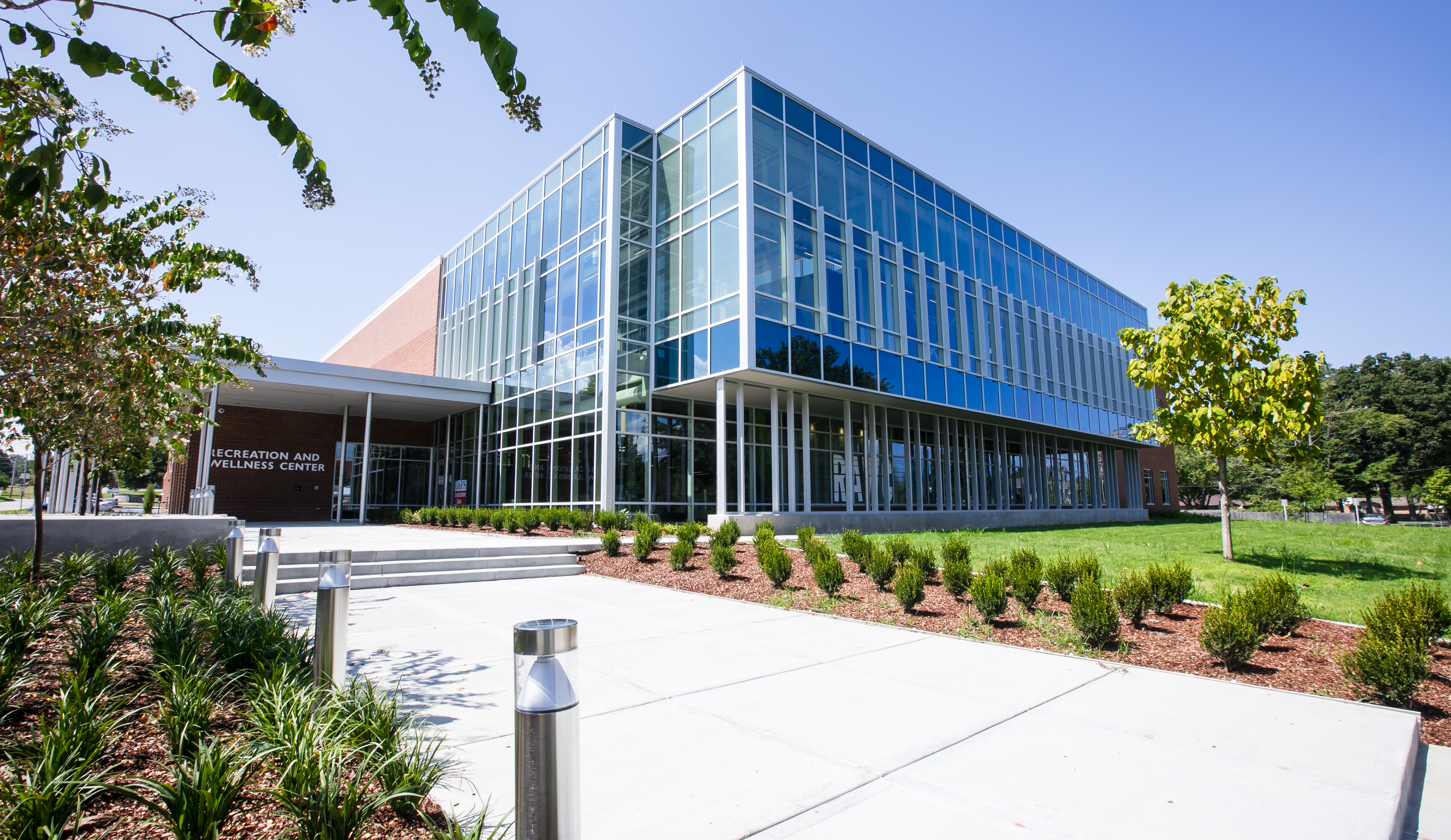
Recreation and Wellness Center

In April 2021, UAFS Chancellor Terisa Riley announced a reorganization of the university's structure which consolidated its colleges from five to three. The three colleges are:

- The College of Arts and Sciences
- The College of Business and Industry
- The College of Health, Education, and Human Sciences (Includes Carolyn McKelvey School of Nursing and School of Education)

== Rankings ==
For 2024, U.S. News & World Report ranked UAFS #34 out of 132 Regional Universities South and #7 in Top Public Schools.

== Campus ==
=== Windgate Art & Design ===
Windgate Art & Design is a visual arts facility located on the UAFS campus that opened in fall 2015. The 58,000-square-foot (5,400 m^{2}) building was constructed following a $15.5 million gift to the university from the Windgate Charitable Foundation. The building includes a letterpress and printmaking studio, a film theater, a videography and photography studio, and numerous classrooms and artistic spaces.

=== Recreation and Wellness Center ===
The Recreation and Wellness Center, more commonly known as the RAWC, is a 47,000-square-foot (4,400 m^{2}) facility that offers multiple facilities, including basketball and volleyball courts, an expanded fitness area with new equipment, a three-lane running track, and a rock-climbing wall. The building was opened in fall 2016.

=== Art galleries ===
The university houses three art galleries that are free and open to the public. The Mary Tinnin Jaye Gallery and the Sally Boreham Gallery are permanent displays that include works rendered in traditional media as well as digital prints and photographs. The Smith-Pendergraft Campus Center's Traveling Art Gallery features rotating exhibits.

=== Arboretum ===
The university has made the entire campus an arboretum, with more than 69 species of trees mapped out by GPS technology.

The campus grounds have won numerous awards for landscaping and horticulture.

==== Awards ====
- The Ball Horticultural Company Floral Displays Champion–America in Bloom 2005 (AIB)
- Green Star Grand Award for the Best Maintained Landscape in the Nation–School or University Category–Professional Grounds Management Society 2003 (PGMS)
- Distinguished Service Award–Keep Arkansas Beautiful 2002 (KAB)

=== Reynolds Bell Tower ===
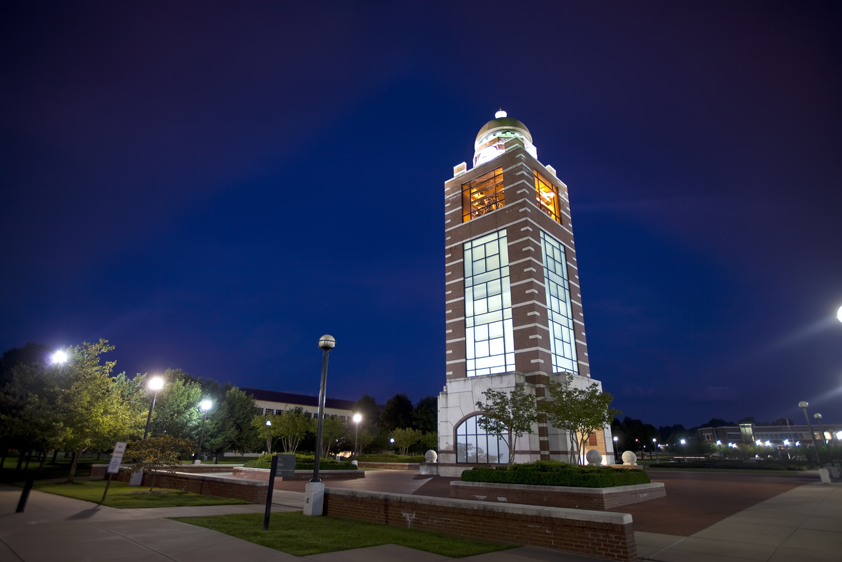
Reynolds Bell Tower

The Donald W. Reynolds Bell Tower was commissioned on May 21, 1993, and dedicated on September 22, 1995. The tower itself stands 108 feet 10 inches (33.2 m) tall and is a full seven stories. It is the largest free-standing belfry in the South Central United States.

=== Numa ===
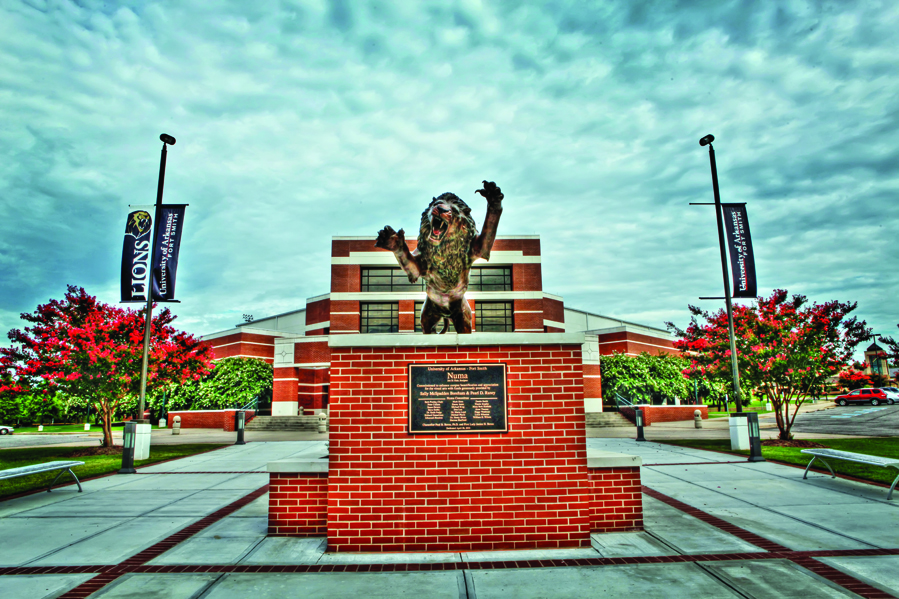
NUMA Statue

In front of the Stubblefield Center, home of the Lions basketball and volleyball teams, is the newly erected Numa statue. The statue is a 15-foot-long (4.6 m), bronze rendition of the university's mascot. The sculpture was unveiled on April 28, 2010, and is the largest statue of a leaping lion in the world.

=== Boreham Library ===
Boreham Library gives students access to computers, printed and electronic books, online databases, and periodicals. The 70,000-square-foot (6,500 m^{2}) facility also includes a 24-hour study zone, fully equipped meeting and classrooms, and the Babb Center for Student Professional Development.

=== Pendergraft Health Sciences Center ===
Opened in November 2004, the Pendergraft Health Sciences Center includes classrooms and facilities for theoretical and practical learning for students in the dental hygiene, nursing, and imaging sciences programs, as well as the student health, dental, and counseling clinics.

=== Baldor Technology Center ===
The Baldor Technology Center includes various labs and workshops for courses such as automotive technology, animation technology, electronics, robotics, and unmanned aerial systems.

=== Smith-Pendergraft Campus Center ===
The Smith-Pendergraft Campus Center is named for donors Fred W. Smith and Ross Pendergraft. The second floor houses some of the most important student services, including Admissions, Advisement, Financial Aid, the Registrar's Office, and the Cashier's Office. The first floor houses the campus bookstore, Box Office, Student Activities Office, and a food court. The Campus Center also has several student lounge areas, professional meeting rooms, a ballroom, and an art gallery.

== Athletics ==
UAFS athletic teams are known as the Lions. The university competes in a variety of collegiate athletics as a member of the National Collegiate Athletic Association (NCAA) at the Division II level. The university is a member of the Mid-America Intercollegiate Athletics Association and sponsors men's sports, including: baseball, basketball, cross country, golf and tennis; women's sports, including: basketball, cross country, golf, tennis, and volleyball.

== Student life ==
Undergraduate demographics as of Fall 2023
Race and ethnicity	Total
White	59%
Hispanic	19%
Two or more races	11%
Asian	5%
Black	4%
American Indian/Alaska Native	2%
International student	1%
Economic diversity
Low-income (Note: The percentage of students who received an income-based federal Pell grant intended for low-income students.)	51%
Affluent (Note: The percentage of students who are a part of the American middle class at the bare minimum.)	49%

=== Student housing ===
The Sebastian Commons Apartments provide upperclassmen with an on-campus housing community. The Commons has a 480-bed occupancy. A traditional dorm-style residence hall with on-site dining, the Lion's Den, opened in August 2010. In the fall of 2011, the university set aside two buildings in the Sebastian Commons for Greek housing.

=== Greek life ===
The university has seven Greek Organizations including four IFC Fraternities and three National Panhellenic Sororities.

== Notable alumni ==
- Zachary Gramlich, American politician
- Jeff McKnight, major league baseball player
- Sonny Weems, former member of the Phoenix Suns
