= University of Arkansas – Pulaski Technical College =

Public college in North Little Rock, Arkansas, US

- Former names: Little Rock Vocational School (1945–1969) Pulaski Vocational Technical School (1969–1991) Pulaski Technical College (1991–2017)
- Type: public technical college
- Established: 1945
- Parent institution: University of Arkansas System
- Budget: $43.9 million (FY 2017)
- Chancellor: Dr. Summer DeProw
- President: Donald R. Bobbitt
- Provost: Dr. Ana Hunt
- Academic staff: 473
- Students: 6,576
- Location: North Little Rock, Arkansas, United States; 34°46′58″N 92°18′00″W
- Campus: Urban 40 acres (0.16 km^{2})
- Colors: Red & Blue
- Website: uaptc.edu

University of Arkansas – Pulaski Technical College (or UA–PTC) is a public technical college in North Little Rock, Arkansas. It is part of the University of Arkansas System and mainly serves the Central Arkansas region, along with Little Rock to the south. The college maintains satellite campuses throughout Pulaski and Saline Counties.

Its main campus is located along a bluff overlooking the Arkansas River in the western part of North Little Rock, northwest of the Eugene J. Towbin Healthcare Center VA facility. The school also maintains a secondary campus on the southwest side of Little Rock along Interstate 30, which includes a separate school focused on the culinary arts and hospitality fields.

It is accredited by the Higher Learning Commission. The college merged with the University of Arkansas System on February 1, 2017. Dr. Summer DeProw began serving as Chancellor at the University of Arkansas Pulaski Technical College on Jan. 2, 2023.

== Center for Humanities and Arts ==
The Center for Humanities and Arts (CHARTS) is a 90,000-square-foot theater that houses a 452-seat proscenium for concerts, theater performances, recitals and other events. The venue is located on campus.

Some notable past performers include Lea Salonga, Renée Goldsberry, and Larkin Poe.
