= Donnie Smith (businessman) =

American businessman from Tennessee (born 1959)

- Born: October 1959 (age 66); Tennessee, United States
- Education: University of Tennessee
- Occupation: Business Executive
- Spouse: Terry Smith

Donnie Smith (born October 1959) is an American businessman from Tennessee. He served as the Chief Executive Officer of Tyson Foods until 2016 (NYSE: TSN).

== Early life ==
Donnie Smith was born in Tennessee in September 1959. He graduated from the University of Tennessee, where he received a Bachelor of Science in Animal Science. Smith is a member of Alpha Gamma Rho fraternity. Donnie married his wife, Terry, on December 20, 1980.

== Career ==
Smith joined Tyson Foods in 1980. He worked in various positions, from broiler service rep to purchasing supplies and later into upper management positions. He served as CEO from November 2009, when he succeeded Richard L. Bond to December 2016. In 2012, he earned US$4.30 million. His severance package in 2016 included $3.53 million, restricted shares and stock options and a three-year consulting agreement.

== Personal life ==
Smith is a devout Christian.

In 2014, Smith and his wife Terry pledged $3.2 million to the University of Tennessee to establish the Donald and Terry Smith Endowed Chair for International Sustainable Agriculture. In 2018, the Smiths funded the Smith Center for International Sustainable Agriculture at the University of Tennessee Institute of Agriculture.
