= Wright Brand Foods =

Former meat-packing company

Wright Brand Foods, Inc.
- Corporate logo, depicting family member and company lawyer Kelly Wright

Wright Brand Foods, Inc. was a meat-packing company located in Vernon, Texas, that was eventually bought by the Tyson Foods corporation in 2001. Begun in 1922 by Egbert Eggleston, what eventually became a multimillion-dollar business started out in the back of a local grocery store.

== History ==
=== The Eggleston years ===
Wright Brand Foods, Inc. was a meat-packing company located in Vernon, Texas, that was eventually bought by the Tyson Foods corporation in 2001 after seeing rapid market growth beginning in the late 1980s.

In 1922, Egbert Eggleston, his son Fay, and son-in-law Roy Wright, founded the Vernon Meat Company in the back of a local grocery store. The initial pork bellies used for making bacon were delivered by railroad cars, covered in salt for preservation, and eventually painted with liquid smoke by Roy Wright.

Four years later, Vernon Meat Company constructed a dedicated housing and shipping plant. The company continued reselling products from other companies, including cheese, tea, beans, vinegar, preserves, and syrup. Initial success led to a burgeoning contribution from other family members eager to help now-manager Roy Wright run Vernon Meat.

In light of continued growth, a slaughterhouse was built that allowed Vernon Meat to control their belly production from the carcass up. Near disaster struck, however, in 1938, when a massive fire consumed most of the plant, including the slaughterhouse. The Eggleston family decided to erect another plant, this time having it federally inspected (Establishment #577). The new facility also received a new company name—the Vernon Packing Company.

=== The beginning of the Wright years ===
The World War II years had the company change ownership, from Eggleston to Roy Wright, whereupon the Wrights constructed an entirely new plant and renamed the company the Wright Packing Company after their family name. Roy's two sons, Bill and Bob, joined their father in the business. As the years passed, Wright Packing steadily grew, and by the 1960s, had 225 employees.

=== The Wright Brothers and the move to specialization ===
Roy Wright retired in 1978, bequeathing the family business he had helped build the last 56 years to his two sons. Realizing that being a generalized, jack-of-all-trades company that handled both the slaughter and processing aspects was limiting their ability to grow, Bob and Bill and the Wright Packing family (led by Bill's son, Dan Wright) decided to focus on processing, thus allowing Wright Packing to specialize its production of ham and bacon, meaning that they offer a wider selection of both, and leave the hassle of slaughtering to other companies. Contemporary favorites such as peppered bacon and hickory-smoked ham sprang from the decision to be dedicated to processing.

As a result of the specialization in processing, Wright Packing became Wright Brand Foods, Inc., and had unprecedented growth in sales, causing a need for newer, larger facilities to accommodate the increased volume of fresh ham and pork bellies, which were made into ham and bacon. Beginning in 1982, with a new derind room, and ending in 2001 with the most recent addition to the plant including infrastructural enhancements to allow for further upgrades, Wright Brand Foods completely overhauled its processing facility and capability. By consulting with ProModel, a corporate manufacturing analysis firm, Wright Brand Foods was able to overhaul critical areas of their plant, thus enabling the company to "double production capacity and save more than $10 million."

=== The final years ===
Bob and Bill retired in 1994. The company was then run by fourth-generation descendants Dan Wright, Kelly Wright, and Kirk Eggleston. Brad Bolton, a fifth-generation member, was the company engineer.

By the end of 1998 – 20 years after changing from a full-line meat packer and processor to a bacon and ham specialist — Wright Brand Foods grew to 650 employees and production in tonnage had increased in those years by several-fold.

== Tyson Foods takeover ==
After negotiations with various meat-production companies in the late 1990s, the Wright family agreed to a buy-out offer by Tyson Foods, Inc. This marked the first time since its creation in 1922 that a member of the Eggleston or Wright families was not in total control of the company.

Wright Brand Foods, now part of the Tyson Foods family, is the largest bacon and ham producer in the Southwest, with 746 employees, distribution to 30 states, and sales between $100M - $250M.
