= University of Arkansas Community College at Batesville =

Public college in Batesville, Arkansas, US

University of Arkansas Community College at Batesville (UACCB)
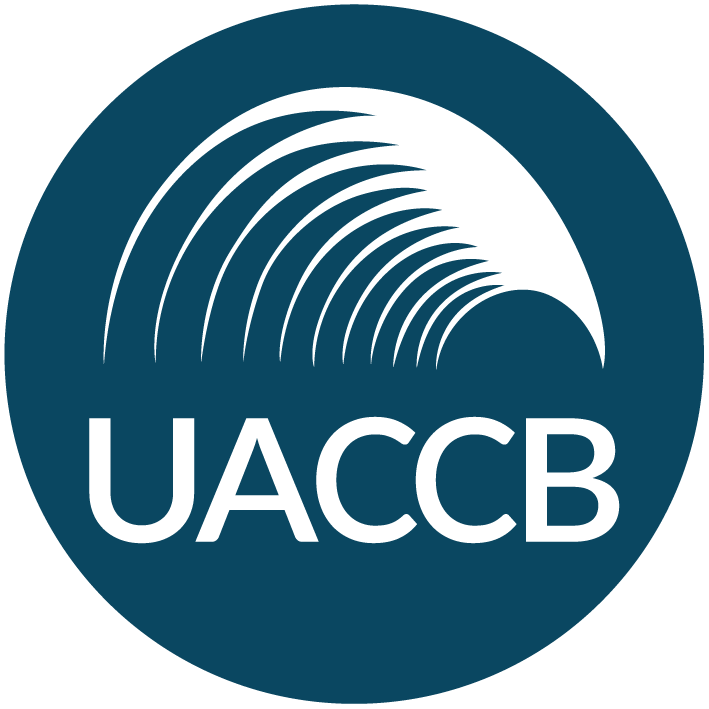
- Former names: Gateway Vocational Technical School; Gateway Technical College
- Type: Public community college
- Established: 1975 (as Gateway Vocational Technical School); 1991 (as Gateway Technical College); 1998 (as UACCB)
- Parent institution: University of Arkansas System
- Chancellor: Brian Shonk
- Academic staff: 122 (As of 2013)
- Administrative staff: Approximately 180 (As of 2013)
- Undergraduates: 1353 (As of 2013)
- Location: Batesville, Arkansas, United States; 35°47′35″N 91°36′54″W
- Website: www.uaccb.edu

The University of Arkansas Community College at Batesville (UACCB) is a public community college in Batesville, Arkansas.

== History ==
The University of Arkansas Community College at Batesville (UACCB) was originally opened in September 1975 as Gateway Vocational Technical School, designed to provide vocational training to the area. In 1991, the facility was organized as Gateway Technical College, offering courses in electrician and mechanical fields. In 1997, Gateway merged with the University of Arkansas system, and a few months later renamed it as the University of Arkansas Community College at Batesville with the passage of a county sales tax in March 1998. UACCB offered both vocational courses as well as courses towards associate degrees and college courses toward "core" requirements at four-year schools.

In the years since its reorganization, UACCB has undergone several campus renovations. The first major renovation, completed in 1999, added an 11,000-square-foot (1,000 m^{2}) Arts and Sciences building, as well as various landscaping and parking additions. The next phase of construction, completed in 2001, added a 37,000-square-foot (3,400 m^{2}) auditorium and conference facility named Independence Hall (after Independence County, of which Batesville is the county seat). In 2002, the college acquired adjacent 24 acres (97,000 m^{2}) of unimproved land and constructed a 14,000-square-foot (1,300 m^{2}) Physical Plant.
