= Kahn's =

American meat processing and distribution company

Kahn's Corporation
- Company type: Meat packing and distribution
- Founded: 1883
- Headquarters: Cincinnati, Ohio, United States
- Parent: Tyson Foods
- Website: www.kahns.com

Kahn's is an American meat processing and distribution company established in Cincinnati, Ohio.

== History ==
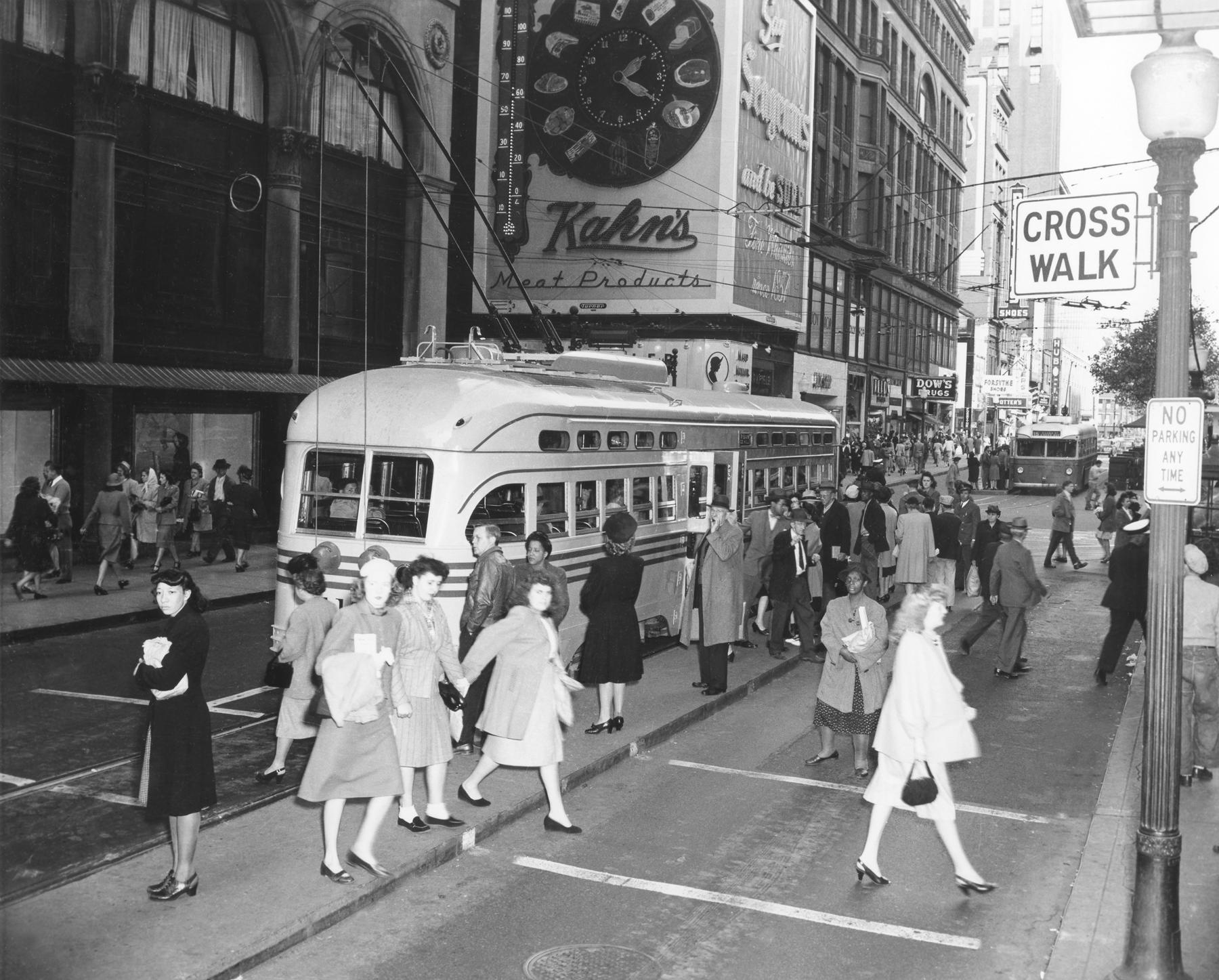
The Kahn's "meat clock" at 5th & Vine in downtown Cincinnati, seen here in the 1940s, was a local landmark.

Originally from Albersweiler in Germany's Rhenish Palatinate, 45-year-old Elias Kahn immigrated to Cincinnati, Ohio, United States, in 1882 with his wife and nine children. Cincinnati had previously peaked as a leader in pork-packing. Once a dominant industry from the pre–Civil War era, the half-million hogs that were corralled through the city's streets had faded by the mid-19th century. Nevertheless, pork was still a big industry in Cincinnati when the E. Kahn's Sons Company was started in 1883. The original location for the meat market was on the city's Central Avenue.

When Elias Kahn died in 1895, his four sons (Albert, Eugene, Louis, Nathan) and daughter (Matilda) took over the family business where it continued to expand. Kahn's quality and mildly seasoned meats resulted in regional demand, as the business continued to thrive for over 80 years. When the last of the Kahn brothers died in 1948, Matilda's son, Milton Schloss, became the company's president. In 1966, the company was sold to Consolidated Foods Corporation. 10 years later, the Sara Lee division of Consolidated Foods expanded after purchasing Hillshire Farm and Rudy's Farm.

== Sponsorships ==
Kahn's franks were the official hot dogs of New York Mets during the 1980s and into the 2000s, being served at Shea Stadium. It is now the official hot dog of the Cincinnati Reds.

== See also ==
- List of Sara Lee brands
