= Arkansas Agricultural Experiment Station =

Agricultural sciences research center based in Arkansas

The Arkansas Agricultural Experiment Station (AAES) is the statewide research component of the University of Arkansas System's Division of Agriculture. The Division also includes the Cooperative Extension Service. The AAES and CES work together to develop and test new agricultural technology and extend it to the public. Research faculty and staff are based on five university campuses, at five Research and Extension Centers; six research stations and seven specialized units.

== Overview ==
The faculty includes some 200 scientists with doctoral degrees, many of whom also have appointments as teaching faculty on their respective campuses. AAES scientists conduct basic and applied research to assist producers, processors and consumers of food, fiber and bio-energy; other agribusinesses; families and communities. Major research areas focus on production and processing of important Arkansas plant and animal commodities; environmental issues; food safety and security; human, family and community development; and human nutrition and health.

AAES scientists often work with colleagues in the U.S. Department of Agriculture, other state experiment stations and other agencies in the U.S. and abroad, as well as with local producers and colleagues in industry organizations or companies.

The AAES Director reports to the U of A System's Vice President for Agriculture. AAES Department Heads report to the AAES Director. Departments are also responsible for academic programs of the Dale Bumpers College of Agricultural, Food and Life Sciences on the Fayetteville campus and the School of Forest Resources at UA-Monticello, and related programs of the Cooperative Extension Service.

== Locations ==
AAES faculty and facilities are located on University campuses at Fayetteville, Monticello, Jonesboro, and Pine Bluff and at the following locations:

Research and Extension Centers have resident faculty and facilities for laboratory and field research.
• Arkansas Agricultural REC, Fayetteville
• Northeast REC, Keiser
• Rice REC, Stuttgart
• Southeast REC, Monticello
• Southwest REC, Hope

Research Stations and Extension Centers have resident staff to assist faculty from other Division of Agriculture locations with field research and extension projects.
• Fruit Research Station, Clarksville
• Livestock and Forestry Research Station, Batesville
• Lon Mann Cotton Research Station, Marianna
• Lonoke Research Center
• Newport Research Center
• Pine Tree Research Station, Colt
• Rohwer Research Station, Desha County
• Vegetable Research Station, Alma

Associated Research and Extension Units
• Judd Hill Plantation
• National Agricultural Law Center
• Soil Testing Laboratory and Research Laboratory
• Leland E. Tollett Veterinary Diagnostic Laboratory
• C.A. Vines Arkansas 4-H Center

Centers of Excellence
• Arkansas Forest Resources Center
• Center of Excellence for Poultry Science

== History ==
The University of Arkansas was established in 1871 under the provisions of the Morrill Land-Grant Colleges Act of 1862, which provided for federal government support of "colleges for the common man" in each state. Land-Grant colleges were mandated to provide higher education, research and public service in agriculture, engineering and military science as well as the usual classical studies. Agricultural research commenced right away, but students showed little interest in agricultural courses. The Arkansas legislature in 1888 established the Agricultural Experiment Station with matching federal funding from the Hatch Act of 1887. The first AES Director, Albert Menke, used increased funding for faculty and staff to expand the research program and course offerings by the same faculty members. Student interest increased, and the College of Agriculture was finally established in 1905. The same faculty for many years conducted all three land-grant college missions of teaching, research and educational services for farmers and rural families. In 1914, the Smith-Lever Act created a national Agricultural Extension Service, and in 1915 the Arkansas Legislature appropriated matching funds to secure the Smith-Lever federal funds to create the Arkansas Cooperative Extension Service. Until 1959, the AAES and CES were units of the College of Agriculture and Home Economics at UA, Fayetteville. That changed in 1959 when the U of A Board of Trustees created the Division of Agriculture as a separate statewide unit of the University of Arkansas System. The Division now administers the AAES and CES; although many research and extension faculty members also have teaching appointments on the campuses where they are housed.

== Departments ==
Department Heads are in Fayetteville, except for Forest Resources at UA-Monticello.
• Agricultural Education, Communications and Technology
• Agricultural Economics and Agribusiness
• Animal Science
• Biological and Agricultural Engineering
• Crop, Soil, and Environmental Sciences
• Entomology
• Food Science
• Forest Resources
• Horticulture
• Human Environmental Sciences
• Plant Pathology
• Poultry Science
