= University of Arkansas Grantham =

University in Little Rock, Arkansas

Coordinates: 36°40′37″N 94°35′46″W

- Motto: Praestantia et Eruditio (Excellence and Knowledge)
- Type: Public online university
- Established: 1951
- Parent institution: University of Arkansas System
- Students: 5,436
- Location: Little Rock, Arkansas, United States
- Colors: Red, Black, and White
- Mascot: Talon
- Website: www.uagrantham.edu

University of Arkansas Grantham (UA Grantham) is a public online university based in Little Rock, Arkansas. Founded in 1951 as Grantham Radio License School, it would eventually be renamed Grantham University. The then-for-profit school offered distance-education programs from 1951 until 2021, at which point it was entirely online. Grantham was purchased by the University of Arkansas System for one dollar in 2021, merging with the latter’s eVersity online program. It is composed of four colleges: the College of Business; the College of Humanities and Social Sciences; the College of Science, Engineering, and Technology; and the College of Health Professions. It is accredited by the Distance Education Accrediting Commission.

== History ==
=== Grantham ===
The university started as Grantham Radio License School, a private school founded in 1951, in Los Angeles. Its founder, Donald Grantham, was an engineer and World War II veteran who offered Federal Communications Commission License certification courses to other World War II veterans after returning from the war. Through the 1950s and 1960s additional campuses were opened in Washington, D.C.; Hollywood, California; Seattle, Washington; and Kansas City, Missouri. In 1961, the university received formal recognition by the U.S. Department of Education., when the Grantham School of Electronics (GSE) became accredited by the Distance Education Accrediting Commission. In 1968, the GSE was renamed the Grantham College of Engineering (GCE). A second Los Angeles campus was established in 1974. In subsequent years, GCE moved all of its operations to the Los Angeles location and offered distance learning programs exclusively. In 1990, GCE obtained approval to operate in Louisiana and relocated to Slidell. It was licensed by the Louisiana Board of Regents in 1993.

In 2005, Hurricane Katrina hit Grantham's main campus in Slidell, Louisiana, destroying approximately eighty percent of their facilities. Days later, more than 140 employees had the university up and running again in temporary offices in Kansas City, Missouri. The school decided to relocate to Kansas City and secured a certificate to operate from the Missouri Department of Higher Education. In June 2006, Grantham signed articulation agreements with Bellevue University and Central Wyoming College. In January 2007, Grantham signed a memorandum of understanding with the Defense Acquisition University (DAU) to accept educational credit earned through successful completion of DAU courses and programs as transfer or elective credit at Grantham.

In November 2021, Grantham joined the University of Arkansas System to officially become University of Arkansas Grantham. By summer 2022, the system's original online college initiative, eVersity, merged with UA Grantham to form one institution.

=== eVersity ===
eVersity is University of Arkansas's original online university, launched in 2014. Unlike the main university, eVersity was entirely online, with no physical classes. At some point during the summer of 2022, eVersity was merged with Grantham, Arkansas having bought them out November 2021 to officially become University of Arkansas Grantham. The online college aspect of eVersity was retained following the merger.

== Academics ==
Undergraduate demographics as of Fall 2023
Race and ethnicity	Total
White	44%
Black	32%
Unknown	9%
Hispanic	8%
Two or more races	3%
American Indian/Alaska Native	1%
Asian	1%
International student	1%
Economic diversity
Low-income (Note: The percentage of students who received an income-based federal Pell grant intended for low-income students.)	59%
Affluent (Note: The percentage of students who are a part of the American middle class at the bare minimum.)	41%

=== College of Business ===
In December 2015, the school received specialized accreditation for its business programs through the International Assembly for Collegiate Business Education (IACBE). At its initiative, the University has decided to voluntarily withdraw from IACBE accreditation on December 31, 2022.

=== College of Science, Engineering, and Technology ===
The College of Science, Engineering, and Technology oversees a number of different programs and courses, including associate degrees, bachelor's degrees and course offerings from project management, digital systems, physics, calculus, differential equations, and programming. In September 2016, the school received accreditation for its Bachelor of Science in electronics engineering technology program through the Accreditation Board for Engineering and Technology (ABET).

=== College of Humanities and Social Sciences ===
The College of Humanities and Social Sciences offers courses that are aimed at strengthening basic skills in writing, speaking, critical thinking and quantitative reasoning. The arts courses include writing and communication, while the sciences include knowledge of the natural world and human civilization.

=== College of Health Professions ===
The College of Health Professions is the newest college. In 2010, the school offered its first online RN-to-BSN program. In 2016, it was awarded program "candidate" status by the Accrediting Commission for Education in Nursing (ACEN). Initial ACEN accreditation for the Baccalaureate and Master's programs in nursing was granted in March 2019. At its initiative, the University has decided to voluntarily withdraw the baccalaureate and master’s nursing programs from accreditation by the Accreditation Commission for Education in Nursing (ACEN) accreditation effective July 1, 2022. On October 21, 2019, the Baccalaureate and Master's nursing programs received initial accreditation from the Commission of Collegiate Nursing Education (CCNE). In 2022 the university discontinued its Nursing program.

=== Accreditation ===
University of Arkansas Grantham has been accredited by the Distance Education Accreditation Commission (DEAC), formerly the Distance Education and Training Council, since 1961. Additionally, as a member of the University of Arkansas System, UA Grantham credits may be transferred to other system universities. The other members of the UA System are accredited by the Higher Learning Commission.

== Faculty ==
University of Arkansas Grantham employs 11 full-time instructors and 232 adjunct instructors.
