= John H. Tyson =

American businessman

- Born: John H. Tyson; September 5, 1953 (age 72); Springdale, Arkansas, U.S.
- Education: Springdale High School; Southern Methodist University
- Occupation: Businessman
- Title: Chairman, Tyson Foods
- Children: 2, including John R.
- Parent(s): Donald J. Tyson; Jean Tyson
- Relatives: John W. Tyson (Grandfather)

John Tyson (born September 5, 1953) is an American billionaire heir and businessman. He was chief executive officer (CEO) of the family business, Tyson Foods, from 2000 to 2006 and has been chairman of the board since 1998.

== Biography ==
=== Early life ===
Tyson was born on September 5, 1953, in Springdale, Arkansas. His grandfather was John W. Tyson, the founder of Tyson Foods. His father, Don Tyson, was CEO of the family business. His mother was Jean Tyson. He graduated from Springdale High School in 1971. He attended the University of Arkansas in Fayetteville, where he was initiated into the Phi Delta Theta fraternity in 1972. He then transferred to the University of Southern California in Los Angeles. Finally, he transferred to Southern Methodist University (SMU) in Dallas, Texas, where he received a bachelor of business administration degree. He attended the University of Arkansas School of Law for a year but dropped out, deciding that becoming a lawyer was not for him.

=== Career ===
He worked at the family business, Tyson Foods, since the age of 13. In 1984, he joined the board of directors. In 1990, he served as vice chairman and in 1993, as president of the beef and pork division. He was CEO from 2000 to 2006. Since 1998, he has been chairman. Under his leadership as chairman and CEO, Tyson Foods acquired IBP, Inc. in 2001, becoming the world's largest protein-processing company. In June 2014, under his leadership as chairman, Tyson acquired Hillshire Brands for $63 per share, making the merger the largest deal within the meat industry.

John and other senior managers helped develop Tyson Foods’ “Core Values.” He also created the company's first Executive Diversity Business Council.

He is a member of the board of directors of Crystal Bridges Museum of American Art. In 2012, the museum received a $5 million donation from the Tyson family and Tyson Foods, Inc., to establish the Tyson Scholars of American Art program and the Don Tyson Prize. In 2016, the museum received a $200,000 Don Tyson Prize.

He is the founder of the Blessings Golf Club in Fayetteville, Arkansas, which opened in 2004. Tyson gave “much of the input on the course design” according to Robert Trent Jones Jr., a golf course architect for Blessings.

Tyson is a member of the University of Arkansas System's Board of Trustees. He is also Committee Chairman of the University of Arkansas Capital Campaign for the 21st Century.

He is also on the board of directors of the Walden Woods Project.

=== Personal life ===
Tyson is an Episcopalian. Like his late father, he collects art and owns paintings by Willem de Kooning, Roy Lichtenstein and Andy Warhol. He married in 1987 then divorced in 1998. He lives in Johnson, Arkansas. He has two children: John Randal and Olivia Laine. Effective May 2025, both of his children were named as directors of Tyson Foods’ board.

In 2006, Tyson received the Woodrow Wilson Award for Corporate Citizenship. In 2011, he was included on Arkansas Business’ “Power List.”

Tyson is also a long-time fan of the Arkansas Razorbacks. In 2024, Tyson played “a key role” in bringing the new Arkansas men's basketball head coach, hall-of-famer John Calipari, to the school. In March 2025, Tyson donated $5 million to create a NIL budget for Calipari to help recruit players.
