= Jimmy Dean (brand) =

US brand of breakfast foods

Jimmy Dean Foods logo

Jimmy Dean Foods is an American brand of meat products marketed and owned by Tyson Foods. The company was founded in 1969 by country singer and actor Jimmy Dean. It was purchased by Sara Lee, which then divested as part of a unit known as Hillshire Brands, which was later purchased by Tyson Foods.

Jimmy Dean's main products are chicken and pork sausage-based breakfast items. The brand is known to have quick and simple meals that are easily cooked and microwavable. Jimmy Dean products may be sold raw, frozen, precooked, assembled, or individually wrapped.

== History ==
Dean founded the Jimmy Dean Sausage brand of breakfast sausage, which was originally called "Pure Pork Sausage." The Jimmy Dean Sausage company did well, in part due to Dean's own extemporized, good-humored commercials. In 1980, the first Jimmy Dean Restaurant opened in northwest Columbus, Ohio, followed by another in west Columbus the following year. Jimmy Dean opened three more restaurants in the Columbus Square shopping center, Oklahoma City, and Indianapolis in 1983.

Dean sold the company to the Sara Lee Corporation in 1984 for $80 million. He remained involved as the company spokesman after the takeover, though Sara Lee, under the leadership of John Bryan, immediately began phasing him out of management duties. In 1985, the Jimmy Dean Restaurants closed, and Bob Evans Restaurants purchased four locations in Columbus and Indianapolis. By 2002, Jimmy Dean was no longer acting as spokesman. In 2018, after Bryan's death, the company resumed an advertising campaign featuring Dean, who had died in 2010.

== Non-meat items ==
In January 2021 Jimmy Dean Sausage Brand added a meatless product to its brand. The plant based Patty Egg White and Cheese Croissant used plant based meat as an animal derived meat substitute.

In the summer of 2021 the company added another meat alternative product. The Jimmy Dean Delights Plant-Based Patty & Frittata Sandwich uses grain and bean substitutes such as quinoa, black bean and soy to replicate the patty. The sandwich still has the same original sausage seasoning to taste like the brand's traditional flavor.

== Food recalls ==
On December 12, 2018, Jimmy Dean announced a recall for over 28,000 pounds of sausage that were possibly contaminated with metal. The recall followed allegations of five consumers who complained of metal pieces in the sausages. The USDA did not report any oral injuries. CTI Foods labeled ready to eat sausage links to be rejected from 21 states and avoided if already stored in home.

== See also ==
- Tyson Foods
