= Leland Tollett =

American businessman

Leland Tollett is an American businessman. He was chief executive officer of Tyson Foods (NYSE: TSN) from 1991 to 1998, and as interim CEO in 1999.

== Biography ==
=== Early life ===
He graduated from the University of Arkansas in 1958 and received an MSA from the same university in 1959.

=== Career ===
He started his career at Tyson Foods in 1959. He became Chief Operating Officer in 1981. He joined its board of directors in 1984. He was president and CEO from 1991 to 1995, and chairman and CEO from 1995 to 1998. He also was interim CEO in 2009, until he was replaced by Donnie Smith. He is under contract to be a consultant to the corporation until he dies.

He has sat on the board of directors of J. B. Hunt, a trucking company listed on the NASDAQ, and Worthen Banking Corp., a financial institution (later acquired by Boatmen's Bancshares, followed by NationsBank and finally Bank of America). He was inducted into the Arkansas Business Hall of Fame in 2011 and the Arkansas Agriculture Hall of Fame in 2012.
