= John W. Tyson =

American businessman (1905–1967)

- Born: July 26, 1905; Mound City, Missouri, U.S.
- Died: January 15, 1967 (aged 61); Springdale, Arkansas, U.S.
- Occupations: Founder and CEO of Tyson Foods
- Children: Donald J. Tyson Randal Tyson
- Parents: Isaac Tyson Jr.; Anna Elizabeth Annie Tyson
- Relatives: John H. Tyson (Grandson)

John W. Tyson (July 26, 1905 – January 15, 1967) was an American businessman, the founder of American multinational corporation Tyson Foods and, from 1935 until his death in 1967, its chief executive officer.

== Biography ==
Tyson was born in Mound City, Missouri, the son of Isaac F. Tyson and his wife Anna, née Skelly. In 1931, John moved to Springdale, Arkansas, with his wife and infant son Don, hauling hay, fruit, and chickens for local growers. Tyson's career in the poultry market began when he heard that chickens were bringing in higher prices in the northern parts of the United States than in his home of Arkansas. Investing his savings and borrowing more, he began hauling chickens to Kansas City and St. Louis markets. In 1936, Tyson drove 500 chickens from his state to Chicago, Illinois, earning enough profit from the trip to fund another. He generated a $235 profit from his initial capital of $1,000 loan and $800 of his own money. His trips then included Cincinnati, Detroit, Cleveland, Memphis, and Houston. As his business expanded, he began increasing his independence, raising his own chicks and milling his own chicken feed.

In the 1940s, Tyson purchased a broiler farm in Springdale and began cross-breeding the high-meat yield New Hampshire Red Christy chickens with other birds, a practice that was not then standard in the industry but which proved successful for Tyson. In 1947, he incorporated Tyson Feed and Hatchery, which was active in three phases of chicken farming: supplying chicks to farmers, selling feed to farmers, and transporting chickens to market. By 1952, the year Tyson's son Don Tyson dropped out of college to join the company as general manager, Tyson Feed and Hatchery was well established, but the field was competitive and the market was troubled.

Tyson and his son considered accepting a buy-out offer from Swanson, but decided to persist instead, and by the end of the decade had built the company's first processing plant in Springdale at a cost of $90,000, $15,000 above estimates. Through 1961, Tyson and his son set about increasing revenues, entering the commercial egg business in 1961 and going public, under the new name Tyson's Foods, in 1963.

John and Helen died in a train accident near Springdale in 1967; Don Tyson succeeded his father as CEO of the company.
