= Hillshire Farm =

Meat products brand

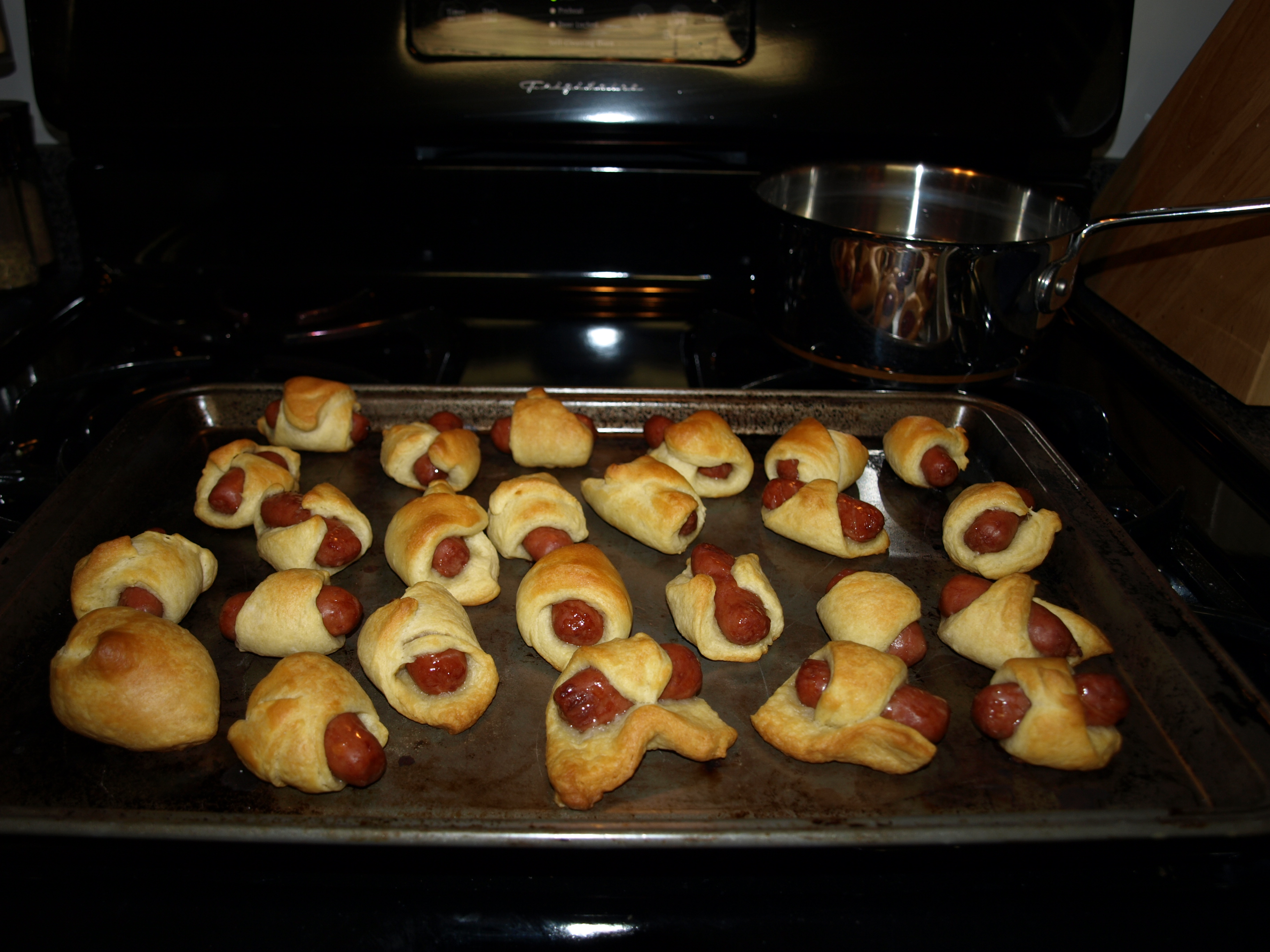
- Type: Meat products
- Manufacturer: Hillshire Brands (Tyson Foods)
- Origin: United States
- Introduced: 1934; 92 years ago
- Website: www.hillshirefarm.com

Hillshire Farm is an American brand of meat products marketed and owned by Tyson Foods The company was founded in 1934, and was purchased by Sara Lee Corporation in 1971. Friedrich (Fritz) Bernegger, (February 2, 1904 – April 30, 1988) born in Austria, started the business at the facility in New London, Wisconsin.

Hillshire Farm's primary products are smoked sausage and Polska kielbasa. The brand introduced smoked sausages to much of the general population of the U.S. as a supermarket food and a nationally advertised food. Hillshire Farm sausages are about two feet long and in the same shape as a ring bologna.

Due to the popularity of the Hillshire Farm brand of meat products, the Sara Lee Corporation spun off into two companies, the "Hillshire Brands" company and "Sara Lee", in 2012. In 2014, Tyson Foods bought the "Hillshire Brands Company" and remains the current owner of the brand.

== Other products ==
- "Lit'l Smokies", a line of bite-sized smoked sausages
- Packaged deli-sliced meats for sandwiches
- Summer sausage, marketed mostly during the Christmas holiday
- Traditional bone-in hams which are either unsliced or spiral sliced

== See also ==
- List of smoked foods
