= Donald J. Tyson =

American businessman (1930–2011)

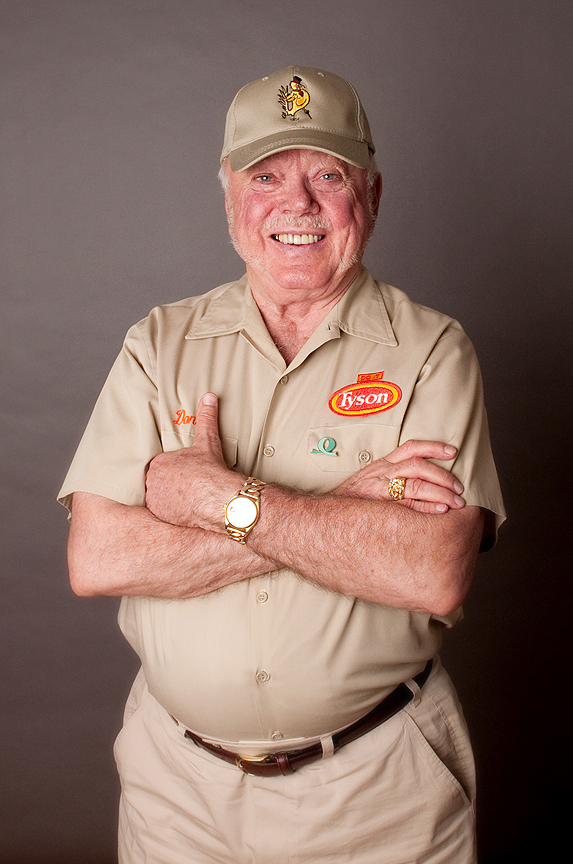
- Born: Donald John Tyson; April 23, 1930; Olathe, Kansas, U.S.
- Died: January 6, 2011 (aged 80); Fayetteville, Arkansas, U.S.
- Occupations: President and CEO of Tyson Foods
- Years active: 1952-2001 (retirement)
- Children: 4, including John H. Tyson
- Father: John W. Tyson

Donald John Tyson (April 21, 1930 – January 6, 2011) was an American businessman who was the president and CEO of Tyson Foods from 1967-1991.

== Early life ==
Tyson was born in Olathe, Kansas. He attended the public schools in Springdale, Arkansas, and completed his education at Kemper Military School in Boonville, Missouri, and at the University of Arkansas in Fayetteville, Arkansas, where he became a member of Sigma Nu fraternity. He left the University of Arkansas before earning his degree.

In 1944, at age 14, Tyson was first introduced into the poultry industry as a chicken catcher and truck driver at Tyson's Feed and Hatchery, the family's poultry feed and live production business started by his father, John W. Tyson. In 1952, he left the University of Arkansas to join his father in expanding the business. The company opened its first poultry processing plant in 1958 on Randall Road in Springdale, with Donald Tyson as the first plant manager.

== President and CEO ==
Tyson was named president of Tyson Foods, Inc. in 1966. He was the company's CEO and chairman from 1967 to 1991, its chairman from 1991 to 1995, and its senior chairman from 1995 until his retirement in 2001. During his tenure, the company's revenue increased from $51 million to more than $10 billion, and Tyson Foods grew to become one of the largest manufacturing companies in the world. According to associates, Tyson enjoyed his job. In his retirement, Tyson continued as a consultant to the company and as a member of its board of directors. His son, John H. Tyson was the CEO of Tyson Foods from 1999 to 2006 and is currently chairman.

== Wealth ==
According to Forbes magazine, Tyson was one of the world's 1,000 richest people with a net worth over a billion dollars in March 2007.

An avid fisherman, Tyson was on the board of directors of the International Game Fish Association. He founded the Billfish Foundation in 1985 and was a member of its board of directors.

== Death ==
Tyson died on January 6, 2011, from cancer. He was 80 years old.
