= Tyson Foods =

American food company

Coordinates: 36°09′13.70″N 94°09′15.49″W

Tyson Foods, Inc.
- Type: Public
- Traded as: NYSE: TSN (Class A); S&P 500 component
- Industry: Food processing
- Founded: 1935; 91 years ago
- Founder: John W. Tyson
- Headquarters: Springdale, Arkansas, U.S.
- Area served: Worldwide
- Key people: John H. Tyson (chairman); Jeff Schomburger (CEO)
- Products: Beef, pork, chicken, and prepared foods
- Revenue: ▲US$54.4 billion (2025)
- Operating income: ▼US$1.10 billion (2025)
- Net income: ▼US$474 million (2025)
- Total assets: ▼US$36.7 billion (2025)
- Total equity: ▼US$18.1 billion (2025)
- Number of employees: 133,000 (2025)
- Website: tysonfoods.com
- Footnotes; Financials as of September 27, 2025.

Tyson Foods, Inc. is an American multinational corporation based in Springdale, Arkansas that operates in the food industry. The company is the world's second-largest processor and marketer of chicken, beef, and pork after JBS S.A. It is the largest meat company in America. It annually exports the largest percentage of beef out of the United States. Together with its subsidiaries, it operates major food brands, including Tyson, Jimmy Dean, Hillshire Farm, Ball Park, Wright Brand, Aidells, and State Fair.

Tyson Foods was ranked 85th in the 2025 Fortune 500 list of the largest United States corporations by total revenue. The company previously ranked No. 79 in the 2020 Fortune 500 list.

Tyson Foods has been the focus of a number of controversies related to the environment, animal welfare, employee satisfaction, and price fixing.

== History ==
The company was established by John W. Tyson in 1935. It expanded during World War II, when chicken was not included in foods that were rationed by the federal government. As of 2025, the company employed 133,000 people. Tyson's locations are concentrated in the Midwest and South.

Tyson produces about one-fifth of the beef, chicken, and pork sold in the United States. It supplies meat to a majority of retail grocers across the U.S. It also supplies Yum! Brands chains that use chicken, including KFC and Taco Bell, as well as McDonald's, Burger King, Wendy's, Walmart, Kroger, IGA, Beef O'Brady's, American restaurants, delis, and schools.

The company makes a wide variety of animal-based, prepared foods. In 2019, Tyson Foods slaughtered approximately 155,000 cattle, 461,000 pigs, and 45,000,000 chickens every week at its 200 facilities worldwide.

In 2021, Tyson Foods launched two vegetarian patty breakfast sandwiches under its Jimmy Dean brand, along with hamburger patties and grounds, bratwurst, and Italian sausages. In 2025, the company was named one of Fortune’s World’s Most Admired Companies, taking the top spot in the Food Production category.

=== Acquisitions and investments ===
The Tyson logo, used as a corporate logo from 1978 to 2017. It has been used, with minor changes, since 1972. It continues to be used as a logo on Tyson brand products. An adapted logo (with Foods wordmark) is currently used as corporate logo since 2024.

The Tyson Foods corporate logo, used from 2017 to 2024

In 2001, Tyson Foods acquired IBP, Inc., the largest beef packer and number two pork processor in the United States, for US$3.2 billion in cash and stock. Along with its purchase of IBP, it acquired the naming rights to an event center in Sioux City, Iowa. Tyson has also acquired such companies as Hudson Foods Company, Garrett poultry, Washington Creamery, Franz Foods, Prospect Farms, Krispy Kitchens, Ocoma Foods, Cassady Broiler, Vantress Pedigree, Wilson Foods, Honeybear Foods, Mexican Original, Valmac Industries, Heritage Valley, Lane Poultry, Cobb-Vantress, Holly Farms, Wright Brand Foods, Inc. and Don Julio Foods.

In June 2014, Tyson won a bidding war against Pilgrim's Pride, agreeing to pay $8.5 billion for the purchase of Hillshire Brands, the maker of Jimmy Dean sausage and Ball Park hot dogs. On July 28, 2014, the company said it would sell its Mexican and Brazilian poultry businesses to JBS S.A. for $575 million and use the proceeds to pay down debt from its pending $7.7 billion purchase of Hillshire Brands Co.

In April 2017, Tyson announced plans to acquire AdvancePierre Foods Holdings, a supplier of packaged sandwiches, for approximately $3.2 billion. The acquisition was completed on June 7, 2017. In November 2017, Tyson Foods bought Philadelphia-based cheesesteak company Original Philly Holdings.

In May 2018, Tyson announced the acquisition of American Proteins, Inc. and AMPRO Products, Inc. for approximately $850 million. On June 1, 2018, Tyson announced plans to sell the Sara Lee Frozen Bakery, Van's, Chef Pierre and Bistro Collection brands to Kohlberg & Company. The sale was completed on August 1. In mid-2018, Tyson Foods agreed to acquire the organic chicken and chicken-sausage brand Smart Chicken and parent company Tecumseh Poultry. On August 9, 2018, Tyson announced that it would sell its pizza crust business, including TNT Crust, to Austin-based Peak Rock Capital, who completed the acquisition on September 4. On August 20, 2018, Tyson announced plans to acquire food supplier Keystone Foods from Marfrig. Tyson announced it had completed the acquisition on November 30, 2018.

On February 7, 2019, Tyson Foods reached an agreement to acquire the European and Thai businesses of Brazilian food company BRF. The acquisition was completed on June 3, 2019. On January 10, 2020, Tyson Foods announced that it sold its Golden Island jerky business to Jack Link's. On May 15, 2021, Tyson Foods announced that it was selling its pet treats business, including True Chews, Nudges and Top Chews, to General Mills for $1.2 billion. The sale was completed on July 7, 2021.

In May 2023, Tyson Foods Inc. announced its acquisition of Tennessee-based Williams Sausage Co., a processor of fully cooked sausage, bacon, sandwiches and other items for retail and foodservice customers. In March 2024, it was announced Tyson Foods had sold its broiler processing plant, hatchery and feed mill in Dexter, Missouri, to the American fresh egg producer, Cal-Maine Foods for an undisclosed amount. In 2023 and 2024, in response to market demands and a decline in earnings, Tyson Foods closed some of its United States plants in an effort to optimize operations. On January 20, 2026, two locations were closed: Lexington, Nebraska, where approximately 3,200 jobs were lost; and Amarillo, Texas, where 1,761 employees were affected.

==== Meat alternatives and clean meat ====
In 2016, Tyson Foods bought a 5% stake in the meat alternative company Beyond Meat, becoming the first major meat producer to invest in a meat alternative company. Tyson made an additional investment in Beyond Meat in 2017. In 2019, Tyson sold its stake in advance of Beyond Meat's initial public offering, with CEO Noel White saying Tyson intended to develop its own meat alternatives. The company also developed the "blended products" line called Raised and Rooted, which featured a combination of animal and plant based ingredients. This line initially included vegetarian nuggets as well as burgers with a blend of beef and pea protein, then expanded to include tenders. In 2020, Tyson discontinued the burger and removed egg whites from the nuggets, announcing that the Raised & Rooted brand would be free of animal products moving forward.

In early 2018, Tyson, through its venture capital arm Tyson Ventures, funded clean meat (cultured meat) research with an investment in California-based Memphis Meats. The same year, Tyson Ventures also invested $2.2 million in Israel-based clean meat company Future Meat.

Former CEO Tom Hayes said Tyson's investments in clean meat and meat alternatives "might seem counterintuitive", but they are part of an effort to meet future consumer demand in a sustainable way. The company also announced in July 2015 that it had reduced the use of human antibiotics in its chicken by more than 84% since 2011.

==== Insects ====
In 2023, Tyson announced an investment in Protix, a company which raises insects to feed to pets and to non-human animals intended for human consumption.

==== Sports collaborations ====
Since 2024, Tyson has partnered with sports teams, including the Green Bay Packers, the Philadelphia Eagles, the Kansas City Chiefs, the Dallas Cowboys, and the Arkansas Razorbacks to release chicken nugget products with team-specific branding. The Arkansas Razorbacks collaboration also included sponsored logos for Tyson and Walmart to appear on the team's football field.

=== Corporate charity ===
Since 2000, Tyson Foods has donated millions of dollars in cash to help non-profit organizations throughout the country. Forbes named Tyson Foods the second most proportionally generous company for its donations in 2007, totaling 1.6% ($8 million) of its annual operating income. Tyson initiated the KNOW Hunger campaign in early 2011 to raise awareness of hunger in the United States. After the Joplin, Missouri tornado of 2011, Tyson sent 77,000 pounds of food to the city. It also sent 100,000 pounds of food to the communities along the Gulf of Mexico after the April 20, 2010, oil spill. In 2012, Tyson donated 38,000 pounds of chicken to Ozarks Food Harvest in the name of the fifth annual McDonald's Cans for Coffee food drive. Tyson has supported "Little Free Pantries," and has partnered with the Chicago Urban League for educational programs on misconceptions about SNAP (food stamp) benefits. During fiscal year 2015, Tyson donated more than 9 million pounds of food. Tyson also "pledged to invest $50 million by 2020 in various efforts to fight food insecurity" in 2015. The company provided $60 million in bonuses to frontline workers and truck drivers in March 2020 for supporting operations to provide food during the COVID-19 pandemic.

Tyson has also partnered with Feeding America donating $2.5 million and 2.5 million pounds of protein each year in 2022 and 2023. In July 2024, following Hurricane Beryl, Tyson's Meals That Matter disaster relief program provided meals to communities in Houston, Texas. In October 2024, Meals That Matter provided meals to Florida and Georgia communities affected by Hurricane Helene. In April 2025, the program sent meals to help those impacted by flooding in Kentucky. In November 2025, Tyson partnered with McDonald's to donate 40,000 pounds of chicken meat to Ozarks Food Harvest. Tyson Foods has made political donations to both major parties.

=== Research and development ===
In 2007, Tyson created the Tyson Discovery Center, a 100,000-square-foot (9,300 m^{2}) R&D center at their headquarters in Springdale, Arkansas, to work on new products and better packaging. They later opened a second Discovery Center in Downers Grove, Illinois.

== Corporate governance ==
The Tyson dynasty holds 70% of voting shares.

=== CEOs ===
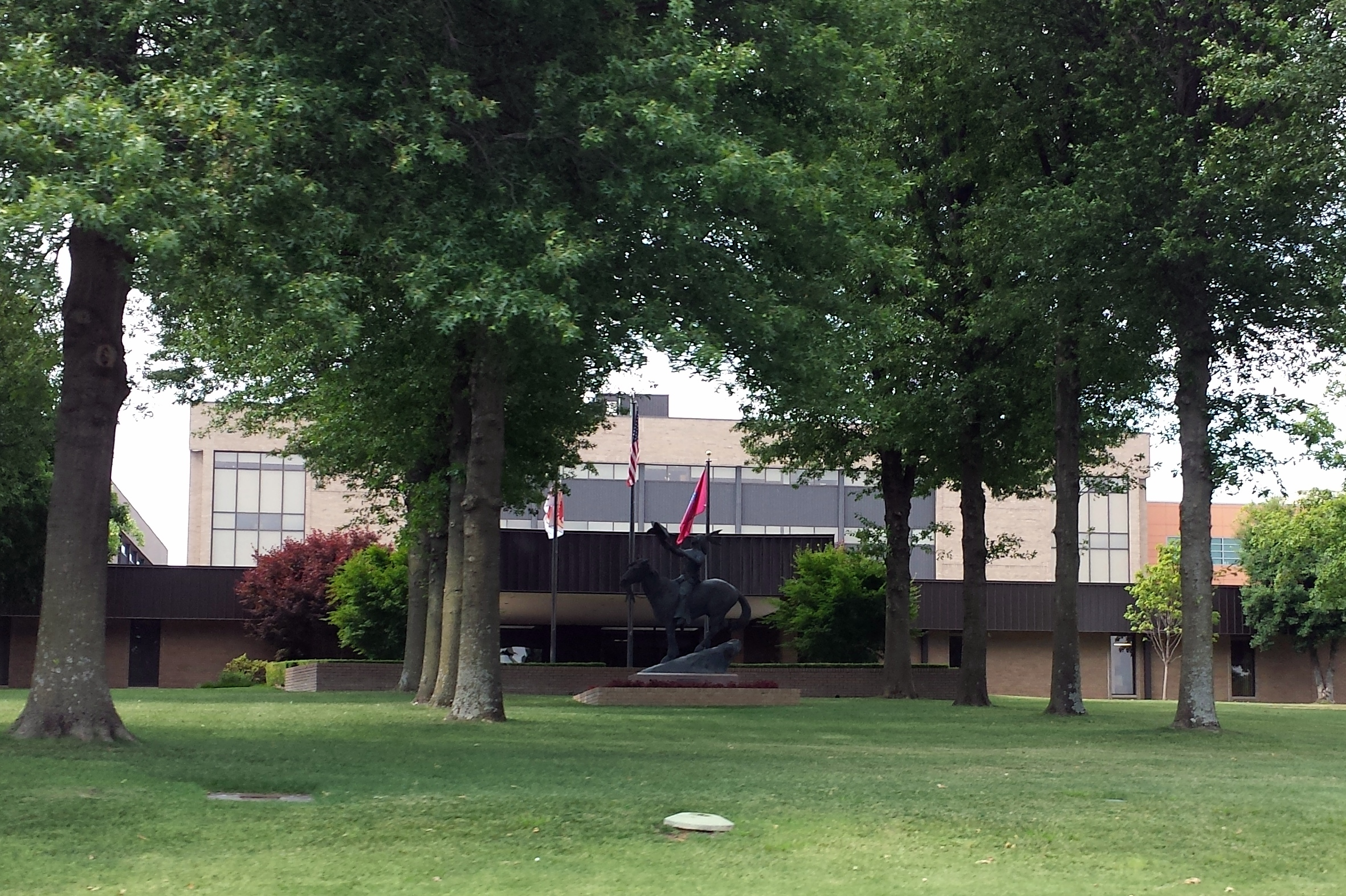
World headquarters of Tyson Foods at 2200 Don Tyson Pkwy, Springdale, Arkansas

- John W. Tyson, the founder, was CEO from 1935 until his death in 1967.
- Don Tyson, CEO and chairman (1967 to 1991).
- Leland Tollett (1991 to 1998).
- John H. Tyson (1999 to 2006).
- Richard L. Bond (2006 until January 2009). Leland Tollett temporarily filled his position.
- Donnie Smith (November 2009 to December 2016). In November 2016, the company announced Smith would be succeeded at the turn of the year by company president Tom Hayes.
- Tom Hayes (January 2017-September 2018).
- Noel White (October 2018-October 2020, beginning of the 2021 fiscal year). White had worked at Tyson since 2001.
- Dean Banks, former Alphabet executive (October 2020-June 2021). On June 2, 2021, President and CEO Dean Banks resigned citing family reasons.
- Donnie King, the former Chief Operating Officer (COO), began serving as president and CEO in June 2021 and is still in office. An alumnus of the University of Arkansas at Little Rock, he had worked at Tyson for 36 years, beginning in 1982. King's compensation for fiscal year 2024 was $22.8 million.
- Jeff Schomburger, a former member of the Tyson Foods Board of Directors, will begin serving as President and CEO effective October 5, 2026.

== Environmental record ==
Tyson Foods has been responsible for numerous instances of environmental damage. Tyson was one of five top emitters in the global food industry, alongside JBS, Marfrig, Minerva, and Cargill, emitting an estimated 496 million tons of greenhouse gasses in 2023. According to the Institute for Agriculture and Trade Policy, Tyson is among the lowest performing companies on their Meat and Dairy Climate Reporting Scorecard.

Tyson has been involved in several lawsuits related to air and water pollution. In June 2003, the company admitted to illegally dumping untreated wastewater from its poultry processing plant near Sedalia, Missouri, from 1998 to 2001. The company pleaded guilty to 20 felony violations of the federal Clean Water Act. According to a Department of Justice attorney, the dumping had continued even after the United States Environmental Protection Agency (EPA) and the Federal Bureau of Investigation searched the plant in 1999. As part of the plea agreement, the company agreed to pay $7.5 million in fines. The company also agreed to hire an outside consultant to perform an environmental audit, and institute an "enhanced environmental management system" at the Sedalia plant.

In 2002, three residents of Western Kentucky, together with the Sierra Club, filed a lawsuit concerning the discharge of dangerous quantities of ammonia from Tyson's Western Kentucky factories. Tyson settled the suit in January 2005, agreeing to spend $500,000 to mitigate and monitor the ammonia levels. In 2004, Tyson was one of six poultry companies that paid a $7.3 million settlement fee to the city of Tulsa, Oklahoma, to settle charges that the use of chicken waste as fertilizer had created phosphorus pollution in Tulsa's main drinking water sources. In 2005, Tyson settled a $500,000 lawsuit related to air pollution in Kentucky.

Tyson's processing plants generate a vast supply of animal fats. In late 2006, the company created a business unit called Tyson Renewable Energy to examine ways of commercializing the use of this leftover material by converting it into biofuels. The unit also examined the potential use of poultry litter to generate energy and other products.

As of 2010, six of Tyson Foods' wastewater treatment facilities capture biogas via enclosed anaerobic lagoons. Four of the systems use the biogas as an alternative fuel to natural gas; from 2008 to 2009, the four facilities used 1.8 billion cubic feet of biogas, replacing 1.3 billion cubic feet of natural gas and saving the company approximately $9.1 million.

In 2013, Tyson paid nearly $4 million in fines due to eight separate incidents between 2006 and 2010 where it accidentally released anhydrous ammonia, an extremely hazardous substance which causes chemical-type burns. These releases killed at least one worker and injured nearly a dozen others.

In Newsweek's 2017 "green ranking", an environmental performance assessment of the largest public companies, Tyson Foods ranked number 223 in the U.S. and number 312 in the world.

According to Tyson's 2019 Sustainability Report, the company was on track to meet most of its sustainability goals and had decreased water use by 6.8% since 2015. Tyson Foods joined the United Nations Global Compact in 2019, and the report also states that the company has goals similar to the United Nations' Sustainable Development Goals.

Environmental groups have blamed Tyson for polluting the Illinois River with poultry litter. A company spokesperson said the litter belongs to independent contract farmers and not to Tyson. To address the problem of poultry litter in watersheds, Tyson and four other poultry companies formed the non-profit organization BMPs in 2004. Tyson says that the organization has helped to move more than 1 million tons of poultry litter out of the Illinois River watershed, redistributing the litter to less nutrient-dense areas.

In 2019, the Environmental Integrity Project stated that Tyson was a major discharger of pollution to waterways in East Texas. The high volumes of blood, urine, feces, and feathers discharged into East Texas rivers and lakes contribute to declining oxygen levels in the water, which endanger local animals, fish and habitat. The Environmental Integrity Project found that the Tyson plant in East Texas violated its Clean Water Act permit a dozen times over 2016–2017. In 2019, wastewater from a Tyson plant in Alabama polluted rivers and killed approximately 175,000 fish. The state of Alabama sued Tyson over the incident the following year.

Also in 2019, Tyson Foods partnered with the Environmental Defense Fund to help farmers reduce nitrogen and erosion across 2 million acres of corn fields in the Midwestern United States and Pennsylvania. The same year, a Tyson building in Springdale, Arkansas, won a LEED silver certification for environmentally friendly design.

As of January 2020, Tyson Foods' land stewardship and sustainable farming program had enrolled approximately 400,000 acres of corn and planned to support improved environmental practices on 2 million acres of corn by the end of 2020.

In 2020, Tyson Foods partnered with the nonprofit organization Proforest to complete a deforestation risk assessment, which concluded that approximately 94% of the company's land footprint is at low risk of being associated with deforestation. To address the remainder found to be at risk, in November the company announced a Forest Protection Standard focused on reducing deforestation risk in supply chains of cattle and beef, soy, palm oil, pulp, paper and packaging.

In 2020, Tyson Foods received a SmartWay Excellence Award from the EPA, recognizing "top shipping (retailers and manufacturers) and logistics company partners for superior environmental performance".

In 2020, Tyson Foods reportedly used 4.89 million acres of land for soybeans and 5.2 million acres of corn for providing feed for their 6 million cows, 22 million hogs, and 2 billion chickens. A study by the Union of Concerned Scientists in 2018 found that only 5% (408,000 acres) of their land has been enrolled in sustainable practices.

In 2024, a study by the Union of Concerned Scientists found that between 2018 and 2022 Tyson released 371 million pounds of pollutants, including nitrogen, phosphorus, chloride, oil, and cyanide, from just 41 slaughterhouses and processing plants into local waterways across the United States. In 2025, the Environmental Working Group (EWG) reached a settlement with Tyson Foods, where Tyson agreed to stop making "net-zero" and "climate-smart beef" claims.

== Labor relations ==
=== Workers' rights ===
According to Celeste Monforton, professor of occupational health at George Washington University, 34 employees were injured at 10 Tyson meatpacking plants from January to September 2015, resulting in one amputation per month on average. Reporting on Monforton's findings in 2016, BuzzFeed News said Tyson Foods "recently launched new programs to improve workplace safety communication, awareness and education."

An Oxfam report issued in 2016 cited anonymous employees who stated they were routinely denied bathroom breaks; they wore adult diapers to work to get through the day. In 2017, Tyson Foods announced plans to provide regularly scheduled bathroom breaks.

The plans stem from compliance audits started in 2012 and an occupational safety and health pilot program established in 2015. The announcement was made in conjunction with Oxfam America and United Food and Commercial Workers. By May 2018, hundreds of Tyson Foods workers at 27 plants had participated in the company's Upward Academy education program.

In December 2024, Tyson and its subsidiary Keystone paid $180 million to settle an antitrust lawsuit, which alleged the company had illegally conspired with other poultry processors to suppress workers' wages.

=== Employment of illegal immigrants ===
Tyson Foods was indicted in December 2001, along with six employees, on charges that it conspired to smuggle illegal immigrants across the Mexican border to work in its processing plants. The 36-count indictment accused Tyson of arranging to transport illegal immigrant workers across the border and helping them get counterfeit work papers for jobs at 15 Tyson plants. In March 2003, a federal jury acquitted Tyson and its managers.

In October 2006, a federal judge granted class-action status to a lawsuit brought by Tyson employees who alleged that Tyson's practice of hiring illegal immigrants depresses wages.

=== Coronavirus (COVID-19) pandemic ===
As the COVID-19 pandemic spread across the US, officials including the sheriff in Black Hawk County, Iowa, criticized Tyson Foods on April 17, 2020, for failing to close a Waterloo, Iowa plant where an outbreak of the disease began. Tyson closed the Waterloo plant on April 22. According to an Associated Press report, the company said the shutdown "would deny a vital market to hog farmers and further disrupt the nation's meat supply". On April 21, Tyson announced the closure of a Center, Texas, plant in Shelby County, a rural area with a rate of coronavirus infections about four times higher than the state average. A local physician reported that over half of the county's cases were associated with employees of the Tyson facility.

On April 22, Tyson announced the closure of a pork processing plant in Logansport, Indiana, due to rising cases. On April 23, Tyson announced that a beef processing plant in Wallula, Washington, was closing.

In June 2020, ProPublica reported that Tyson did not implement recommended safety measures to protect its workers, such as physical distancing, plexiglass barriers, and wearing of face masks, until outbreaks began to occur. On June 21, the government of China announced that it was suspending imports of chicken from a Tyson factory. The company confirmed that the affected facility was its Berry Street plant in Springdale, Arkansas.

In November 2020 a wrongful-death lawsuit previously filed by the family of a Tyson employee, alleging "willful and wanton disregard" for employees' health and safety with regard to COVID-19, was amended with new allegations that a plant manager had organized a pool for supervisor and managers to bet on how many employees would be affected with COVID-19.

In November 2020, Tyson suspended multiple top officials and retained the law firm Covington & Burling to conduct an investigation into these allegations. In December 2020, Tyson terminated seven of its top managers at the Waterloo, Iowa plant as a result of the investigation. The Waterloo plant is Tyson's largest pork plant and was the centre of a COVID-19 outbreak that infected more than 1000 Tyson employees, killing six. Tyson issued a statement saying that those terminated did not represent the company's core values.

In August 2021, Tyson announced that all employees were required to be "fully vaccinated" with COVID-19 vaccines by November. The company offered employees a $200 incentive to get vaccinated. The mandate was suspended in October, 2022.

In August 2025, the United States Court of Appeals for the Fifth Circuit revived a COVID-19-related negligence lawsuit against Tyson arising from the death of an employee at its meatpacking plant in Carthage, Texas. The employee's family alleged that Tyson failed to take adequate precautions to protect workers from COVID-19 after a coworker who had tested positive continued reporting to work. A federal district court had dismissed the claims against Tyson as preempted by the federal Poultry Products Inspection Act, but the Fifth Circuit reversed that portion of the ruling, holding that the Act did not preempt state-law workplace-safety claims unrelated to the regulation of poultry products. The court remanded the claims against Tyson for further proceedings.

== Production ==
=== Use of antibiotics ===
In 2007, Tyson began labeling and advertising its chicken products as "raised without antibiotics". Tyson competitors Perdue Farms and Sanderson Farms sued, saying Tyson's claim violated truth-in-advertising/labeling standards. Tyson acknowledged using ionophores in chicken feed. Ionophores are used to control coccidiosis, a parasite common in poultry, and the medication is not used in human medicine. A federal judge ordered Tyson to stop making the "raised without antibiotics" claim by May, 2008.

In June 2008, USDA inspectors discovered that Tyson had also been using gentamicin, an antibiotic, in unhatched eggs. USDA spokespeople stated Tyson had not disclosed the use of this antibiotic to the agency, and they issued a letter informing Tyson that the "raised without antibiotics" claim was not truthful. A Tyson spokesperson acknowledged that the company uses the antibiotic and stated that its use is standard industry practice.

The USDA had approved the "raised without antibiotics" label, but withdrew their approval after learning Tyson used ionophores. Tyson and the USDA compromised on rewording Tyson's slogan as "raised without antibiotics that impact antibiotic resistance in humans", but the USDA later said Tyson could not use that label either. In June 2008, Tyson agreed to voluntarily remove its "raised without antibiotics" label in future packaging and advertising.

In 2015, Tyson Foods announced plans to stop feeding chickens with antibiotics used in human medicine. In 2017, the company announced plans to stop using all antibiotics on chickens for Tyson-branded breasts, nuggets, and wings. In 2023, Tyson introduced ionophores into their chicken feed and dropped the "no antibiotics ever" label from their chicken products.

A USDA inspection announced in August 2024 found that 20% of tested beef samples on track to be labeled as antibiotic-free were positive for antibiotics. The advocacy group Farm Forward found, through a Freedom of Information Act request, that Tyson was one of several producers of beef that tested positive for antibiotics, alongside JBS and Cargill.

=== Animal welfare ===
Tyson Foods has faced criticism over allegations of animal abuse and welfare issues. After undercover investigations of animal abuse at Tyson Foods went public, Tyson argued that the undercover animal rights activists were at fault for the abuse by not actively preventing it.

In 2006, Tyson completed a study to determine whether controlled atmosphere killing, which uses gas to render chickens unconscious before slaughter, could be a more humane practice than conventional electrical stunning. According to Bill Lovette, Tyson's senior group vice president of poultry and prepared foods, the study found no difference between the humaneness of the two methods. The company planned to ask scientists at the University of Arkansas to initiate a similar study to test these initial results.

In 2012, Tyson introduced an auditing program known as FarmCheck to check how animals are treated by the company's suppliers. The program was introduced as a trial on certain hog farms, and was the first major program of its kind to apply penalties to producers for noncompliance. By 2020, FarmCheck had expanded to Tyson's poultry suppliers, and its poultry audits were certified by the Professional Animal Auditor Certification Organization.

In 2014, after an NBC News report on abuse of piglets at a Tyson pig farm in Oklahoma, Tyson announced new animal care guidelines, such as keeping sows in larger cages, installing video cameras in cages, using pain mitigation strategies in the castration of piglets, and avoiding killing piglets through blunt force. Animal rights activities called on Tyson to make the guidelines a "mandate" rather than a "recommendation."

In 2015, Tyson Foods severed ties with a supplier after Mercy For Animals published videos showing that employees at a Tyson supplier were stabbing, clubbing and stomping on chickens. A 2016 undercover investigation by the animal rights organization Compassion Over Killing showed workers at four separate Tyson processing plants throwing, punching and kicking chickens, as well as sticking plastic rods through their beaks. They also wrung birds' necks, ran over them with forklifts, and left injured birds in heaping piles to die.

A 2017 investigation showed more abuse and cruelty toward chickens. Tyson responded by saying it would introduce a remote video auditing system to monitor treatment of chickens in its supply chain and hire off-site auditors. The company also started a pilot program for controlled atmosphere stunning, considered to be a more humane method of slaughter. Animal rights activists said the measure did not go far enough. In 2017, Matthew Prescott of the Humane Society of the United States criticized Tyson for failing to implement many of the animal welfare standards that other food suppliers were adopting.

In 2020, Tyson worked with the University of Arkansas System Division of Agriculture to investigate the effects of lighting on broiler chicken welfare. Their research project received a $110,000 grant from the U.S. Poultry and Egg Association. Following a 2020 complaint, the Federal Trade Commission is investigating Tyson for making false and misleading advertising claims regarding the treatment of its chickens.

=== Food recalls ===
On January 30, 2019, Tyson Foods announced a recall for over 36,000 pounds of chicken nuggets that were at risk of being contaminated with small pieces of rubber. The recall followed allegations by consumers who submitted complaints to the U.S. Agriculture Department. On March 21, 2019, the company issued a recall for 69,000 pounds of chicken strips potentially contaminated with pieces of metal, following six complaints submitted to the Food Safety and Inspection Service. An expanded recall for nearly 12 million pounds of chicken strips was issued on May 4, 2019.

On June 7, 2019, Tyson Foods announced a recall for over 190,000 pounds of chicken fritters, which potentially contained hard plastic following reports from three consumers. The products were not sold in retail stores but supplied to various food service locations, including schools.

On July 3, 2021, Tyson Foods announced a recall for approximately 8,955,296 pounds of ready-to-eat (RTE) chicken products that may have been adulterated with Listeria monocytogenes. These chicken products were produced between December 26, 2020, and April 13, 2021.

== Price manipulation ==
In 2016, Maplevale Farms sued Tyson and 13 other poultry producers for alleged price fixing. In 2017, Tyson was cleared by the Securities and Exchanges Commission (SEC) following their investigation. In 2018, food distributors Sysco Corp and US Foods Holding Corp filed similar lawsuits, followed by Walmart in 2019. The companies were accused of working together to restrict the supply of chickens and manipulate prices allegedly starting in 2008. Tyson has denied the allegations, with a spokesperson calling them "baseless."

In 2018, a class-action lawsuit was filed against Tyson and seven other major pork producers including Hormel Foods, JBS, Seaboard, and Smithfield Foods, accusing the companies of conspiring to artificially raise the price of pork via the tech platform Agri Stats. In October 2025, Tyson agreed to pay $85 million to settle the lawsuit.

In June 2020, Tyson announced it was cooperating with the U.S. Department of Justice (DOJ) in relation to price fixing and bid rigging in the poultry industry. Tyson was cooperating under a leniency program to avoid criminal prosecution by providing aid to DOJ investigators. Prior to the announcement, four poultry industry executives were indicted for conspiracy to engage in price fixing. In March 2021, Tyson agreed to pay $221.5 million to poultry buyers to settle the price-fixing claims.

In 2024, McDonald's sued JBS, National Beef, Cargill and Tyson, along with their subsidiaries, for alleged price fixing. In 2026, both Cargill and Tyson settled, agreeing to pay $87.5 million.

== See also ==
- Broiler industry
- Chicken patty
- Cultured meat
- Food industry
- Food, Inc.
- Golden Triangle of Meat-packing
- The Meat Racket, book by Christopher Leonard
- Labor rights in American meatpacking industry
