= University of Arkansas System Division of Agriculture =

The University of Arkansas System Division of Agriculture is the agricultural research center for the University of Arkansas (UA).

The Division has over 1,650 faculty and staff members, including about 250 with PhD degrees in Agricultural Experiment Station and Cooperative Extension Service units on five university campuses, at five regional centers, seven research stations, nine specialized units and in all 75 Arkansas counties.

== Organization ==
The Division has five major research and extension program areas:

- Agriculture Production and Processing
- Environmental sustainability
- Food safety and security
- Health and nutrition
- 4-H, youth, family and community development

=== Administration ===
The UA vice president for Agriculture is responsible for the Division of Agriculture and reports to the President of the University . Three Associate Vice Presidents for Research, Extension and Academic Programs report to the Vice President. Programs are organized under the following departmental structure with department and unit heads who report to the associate vice presidents:

- Agricultural Economics
- Agricultural Education, Communications and Technology
- Animal Science
- Biological and Agricultural Engineering
- Crop, Soil, and Environmental Sciences
- Entomology
- Food Science
- Forest Resources
- 4-H and Youth Development
- Horticulture
- Human Environmental Sciences
- Plant Pathology
- Poultry Science

The departmental structure for research and extension programs also encompasses graduate and undergraduate degree programs under the auspices of the respective campuses.

Division funding sources in 2013 included: •

- State Appropriations - 57.0%
- Federal Appropriations - 9.1%
- County Appropriations - 2.4%
- Federal Grants and Contracts - 11.0%
- State Grants and Contracts - 1.9%
- Private Grants and Contracts - 10.8%
- Sales, Fees and Royalties, etc. - 7.8%

== Locations ==
Division of Agriculture faculty, staff and facilities support academic programs are located on UA campuses in

- Fayetteville
- Monticello
- Pine Bluff
- Little Rock
- Arkansas State University in Jonesboro.

They are also based at the following locations.

- Arkansas Agricultural Research and Extension Center, Fayetteville
- Rice Research and Extension Center, Stuttgart
- Northeast Research and Extension Center, Keiser
- Southeast Research and Extension Center, Monticello
- Southwest Research and Extension Center, Hope

Research Stations and Extension Centers have resident staff to assist faculty from other Division of Agriculture locations with field research and extension projects.
Fruit Research Station, Clarksville

- Livestock and Forestry Research Station, Batesville
- Lon Mann Cotton Research Station, Marianna
- Lonoke Extension Center
- Newport Extension Center
- Pine Tree Research Station, Colt
- Newport Research Station, Newport
- Rohwer Research Station
- Vegetable Research Station, Alma

Associated Research and Extension Units

- Judd Hill Plantation
- National Agricultural Law Center
- Soil Testing and Research Laboratory
- Leland Tollett Veterinary Diagnostic Laboratory
- C.A. Vines Arkansas 4-H Center

Centers of Excellence

- Arkansas Forest Resources Center
- Center of Excellence for Poultry Science

== History ==
The origins of the Division of Agriculture are found in the 1871 charter of the Arkansas Industrial University, now the University of Arkansas. The university was established at Fayetteville under the Morrill Land-Grant Act of 1862. The original Board of Trustees resolved that:

... the leading object shall be—without excluding other scientific and classical studies and including military tactics, to teach such branches of learning as are related to Agriculture and Mechanical Arts in order to promote the liberal and practical education of the industrial classes in the several pursuits and professions of life...(and)...To prosecute experiments for the promotion of agriculture and horticulture.

The Agricultural Experiment Station, College of Agriculture and Cooperative Extension Service were established in 1888, 1905 and 1914, respectively, in keeping with the three-part Land-Grant mission of the University of Arkansas. The agricultural research and extension programs were statewide in scope from the beginning. Extension headquarters were in Little Rock, and several branch experiment stations were established.

In 1959, the UA Board of Trustees established the Division of Agriculture as a statewide entity of the University System. The organizational structure provides for direct appropriation to the Division of Agriculture by the Arkansas General Assembly of funds for research and extension administered by the Division of Agriculture as an equal partner to the campuses and other units in the University System.
