= Toxey Haas =

American entrepreneur and conservationist (born 1960)

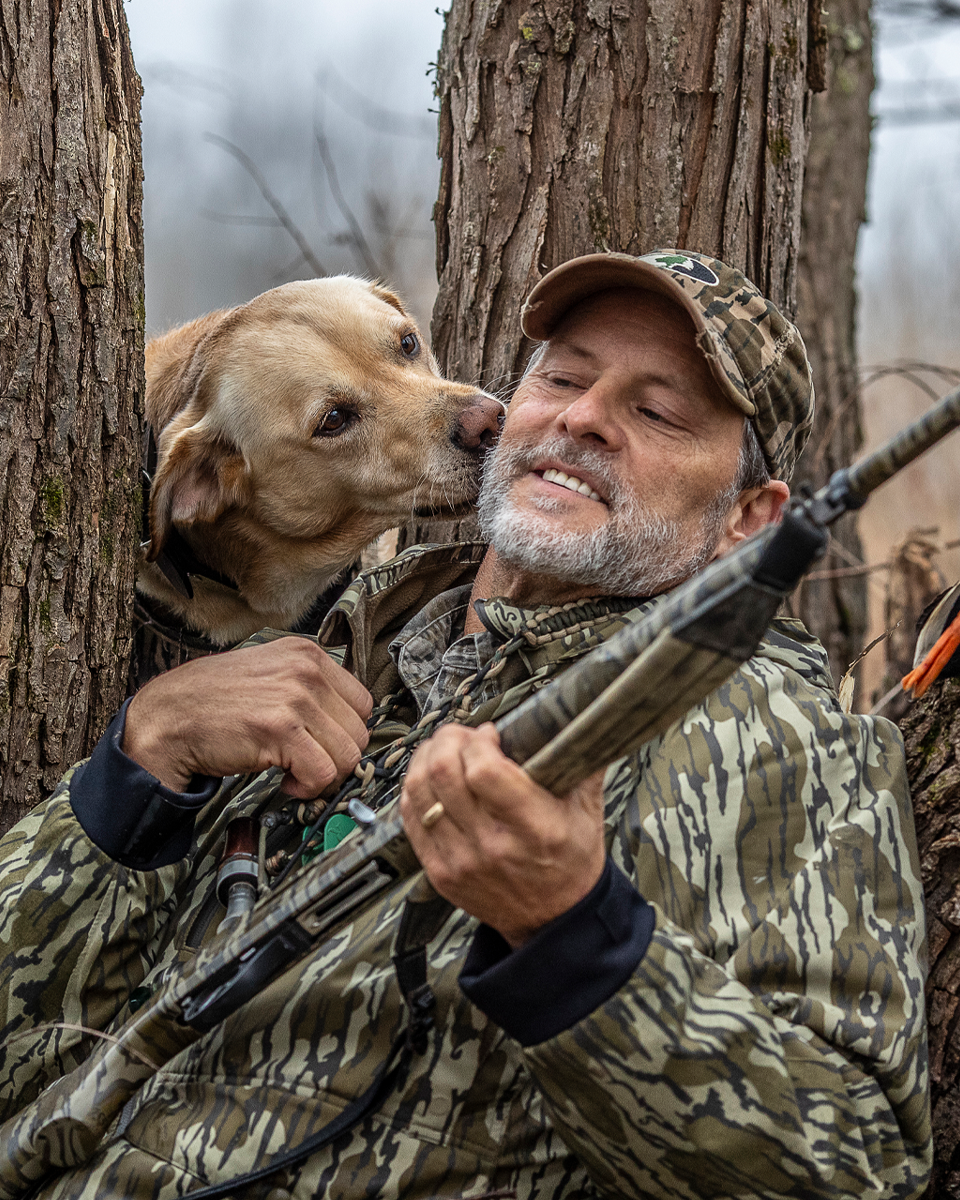
- Born: January 21, 1960 (age 66); West Point, Mississippi, U.S.
- Education: Mississippi State University
- Occupations: Founder and CEO of Haas Outdoors, Inc.
- Spouse: Diane Lusk Haas
- Parent: Fox Haas
- Website: www.mossyoak.com

Toxey Daniel Haas III (born January 21, 1960) is an American entrepreneur and conservationist. He is the founder and CEO of Haas Outdoors, Inc., established in 1986.

== Early life and education ==
Haas was born and raised in West Point, Mississippi where he attended Oak Hill Academy. His father Fox took him hunting at Choctaw Bluff, a hunting club near Mobile, Alabama. A tree at their favorite hunting spot known as the Mossy Oak tree would serve as key inspiration in Haas' business career. After graduating in 1976, he continued his education at Mississippi State University. While at Mississippi State, he was a member of Sigma Chi fraternity and attained his bachelor's degree in Business Administration.

Haas married Diane Lusk, and they moved back to West Point. He began working for Bryan Foods, a division of Sara Lee.

== Career ==
Haas was first inspired by observing a handful of Mississippi dirt, where he noticed that leaves, twigs, and dirt provided "nature’s own camouflage". Haas consequently had an idea to improve the conventional camouflage that hunters used and pursued his first camouflage pattern. After being turned down many times, Crystal Springs Print Works in Georgia agreed to print his pattern. However, they had a 10,000 yard minimum, and he could only afford 800 yards. Haas convinced them to make an exception. Haas officially left his job at Bryan for his entrepreneurial pursuits and enlisted the help of his friend Bill Sugg as his partner.

In 1986, when he was only twenty-six years old, Haas founded Haas Outdoors, Inc and introduced the Mossy Oak brand of outdoor clothing using the "Bottomland" pattern he designed for turkeys, bow hunting deer, and duck hunting. The first Mossy Oak clothing was sewn by Haas' mother in his childhood home. For the first few years, the brand became regionally popular. Haas Outdoors has five major patterns: Break-Up, Treestand, Obsession, Duck Blind, and Brush.

Haas and his friend Chris Hawley co-founded Mossy Oak's real estate company Mossy Oak Properties in 1999. Haas, along with wildlife biologist Grant Woods, cofounded BioLogic in 1999. BioLogic is headquartered in West Point. Founded in 2007, Nativ Nurseries is headquartered in West Point and grows and sells trees for landowners. Other branches of the Mossy Oak Brand include Mossy Oak Productions and Nativ Nurseries.

In 2000, Haas and his family purchased a 200-acre piece of property and began converting the timberland into a waterfowl impoundment, manipulating water levels and planting crops in the area to draw in ducks.

== Awards and recognition ==
- Mississippi Small Business Person of the Year (1989)
- West Point Hall of Fame (1999)
- Catch-A-Dream "Corporate Vision Award" (2004)
- Legends of the Outdoors Hall of Fame (2009)
- Ducks Unlimited Hero of Conservation (2009)
- Mississippi State University College of Business Alumnus of the Year (2017)
- National Wild Turkey Federation Lifetime Achievement Conservation Award (2022)

== Appearances in literature ==
Chapters of the following books regard Haas' endeavors:

- Storms of Perfection, Andy Andrews
- Mississippians, Neil White
- Mississippi Entrepreneurs, Polly Dement
- What No One Ever Tells You about Starting Your Own Business: Real-Life Start-Up Advice from 101 Successful Entrepreneurs, Jan Norman
