= Wrigley Square =

Public square in the Millennium Park in Chicago, Illinois, United States

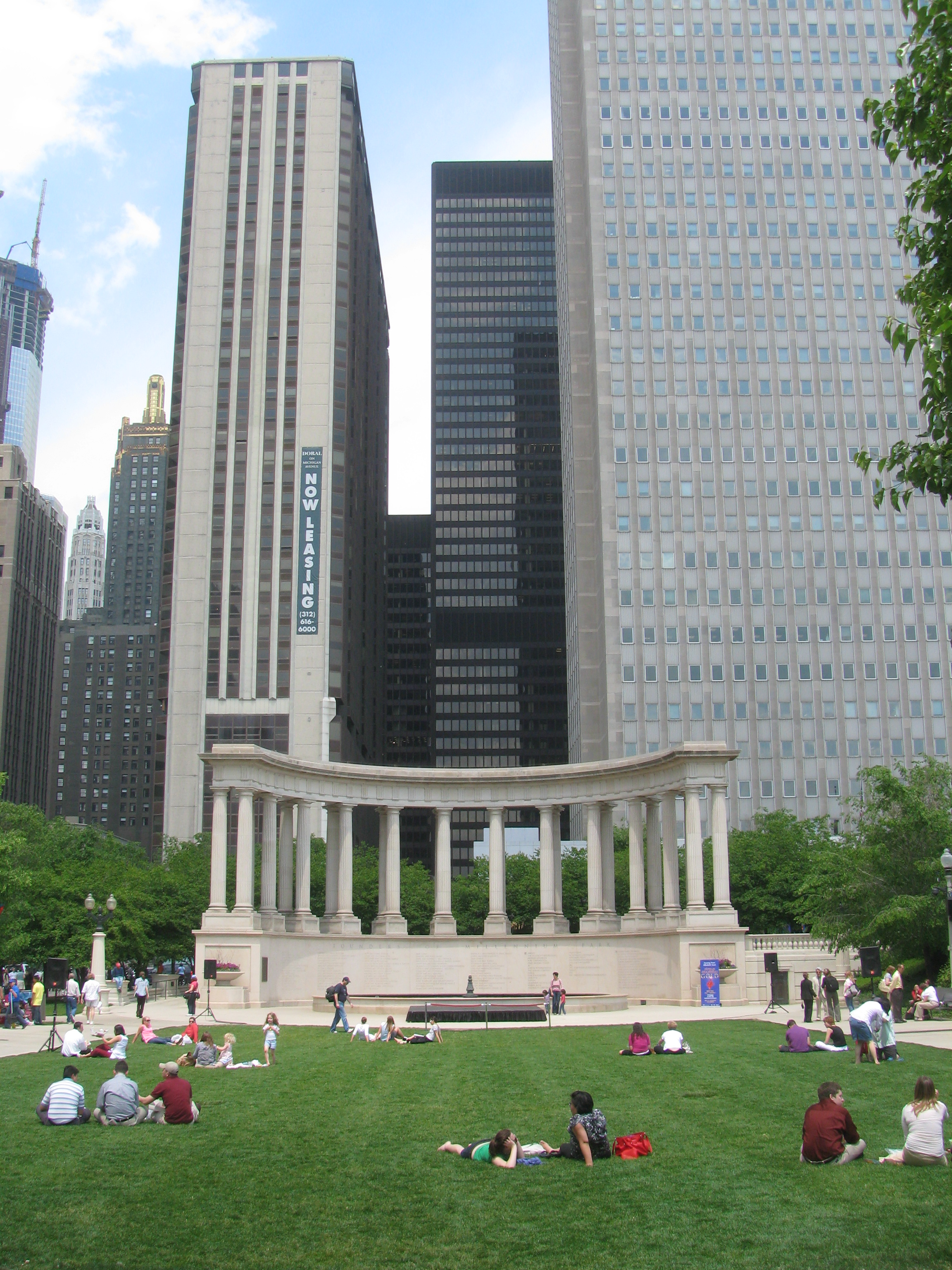
- Millennium Monument Peristyle at Wrigley Square
- Interactive map of Wrigley Square
- Type: Public park/Town Square
- Location: Millennium Park; Chicago, Illinois
- Coordinates: 41°53′1.41″N 87°37′25.65″W
- Created: October 30, 2002
- Operator: City of Chicago
- Status: Open all year
- Parking: 2218 (Millennium Park parking garage)

Wrigley Square is a public square located in the northwest section of Millennium Park in the Historic Michigan Boulevard District of the Loop area of Chicago in Cook County, Illinois, United States. The square is located at the southeast corner of the intersection of East Randolph Street and North Michigan Avenue. It contains the Millennium Monument, a nearly full-sized replica of the semicircle of paired Roman Doric-style columns (called a peristyle) that originally sat in this area of Grant Park, near Michigan Avenue and Randolph Street, between 1917 and 1953. The square also contains a large lawn and a public fountain.

== Detail ==
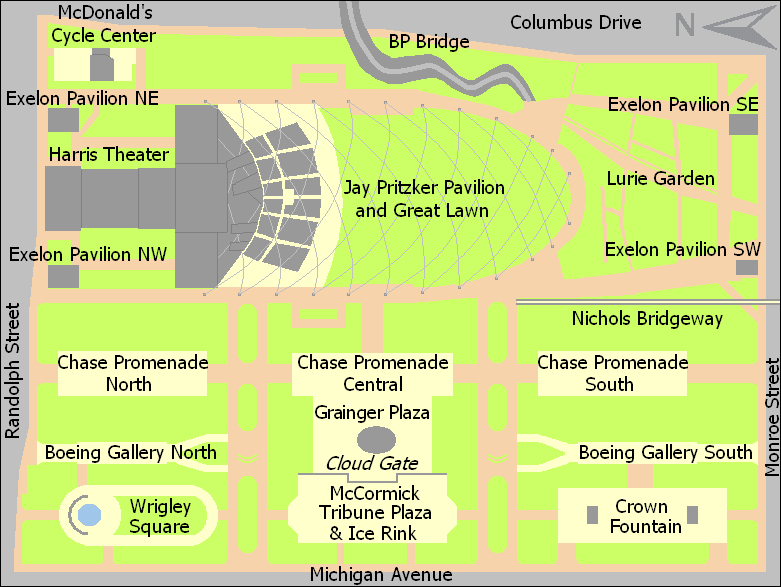
Image map of Millennium Park; east is at the top. Each feature or label is linked.

Lying between Lake Michigan to the east and the Loop to the west, Grant Park has been Chicago's front yard since the mid 19th century. Its northwest corner, north of Monroe Street and the Art Institute, east of Michigan Avenue, south of Randolph Street, and west of Columbus Drive, had been Illinois Central rail yards and parking lots until 1997, when it was made available for development by the city as Millennium Park. Today, Millennium Park trails only Navy Pier as a Chicago tourist attraction.

The square is a tree-lined section of Millennium Park with a large lawn. The area broadcasts free Wi-Fi wireless technology. The square has earned a reputation as an outdoor culture spot by hosting a wide range of cultural events such as local and international art and photography exhibitions, as well as occasional live musical performances. This reputation is reminiscent of the earlier neo-classical meeting place. When Mayor of Chicago Richard M. Daley dedicated the square, it was dedicated to the donors, known as the Founders Group, who funded Millennium Park.

In 2005, Millennium Park was marked for updates and improvements. Benches were to be added to the 56 original benches. Landscape architect Kathryn Gustafson designed 14 new 320-pound (145.1 kg), aluminum "Maggie benches" in Millennium Park, mostly in Wrigley square, in honor of Mayor Daley's wife.

The square was intended to serve as an exhibit space for outdoor sculpture as well as small cultural performances, according to Christopher Perille, vice president of the Wrigley Square Foundation. The square's peristyle monument is in remembrance of the corporation, foundations, and individuals who made Millennium Park possible.

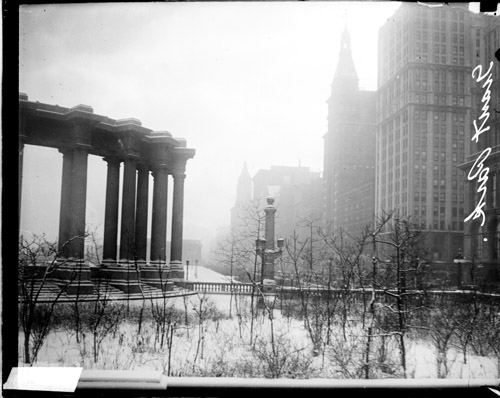
1926 view of original

An architectural model of Wrigley Square and Millennium Monument, designed by O'Donnell, Wicklund, Pigozzi and Peterson Architects, Inc. (OWP&P) in 2000, is on display at the Harold Washington Library Center.

=== Original peristyle ===
In 1917, the original peristyle was designed by renowned Chicago planner Edward H. Bennett, who was Daniel Burnham's partner in the Plan of Chicago and who was known for designing the nearby Buckingham Fountain. It was located in Grant Park in the same location as the current Wrigley Square. The original peristyle rose to 40 feet (12.2 m) and had a diameter of 100 feet (30.5 m). The original was made of concrete, which did not stand up to the Lake Michigan lakefront weather. In 1953 it was razed to make way for the Grant Park North Garage. The original peristyle was on a promenade with balustrades.

=== Millennium Monument ===
Millennium Monument
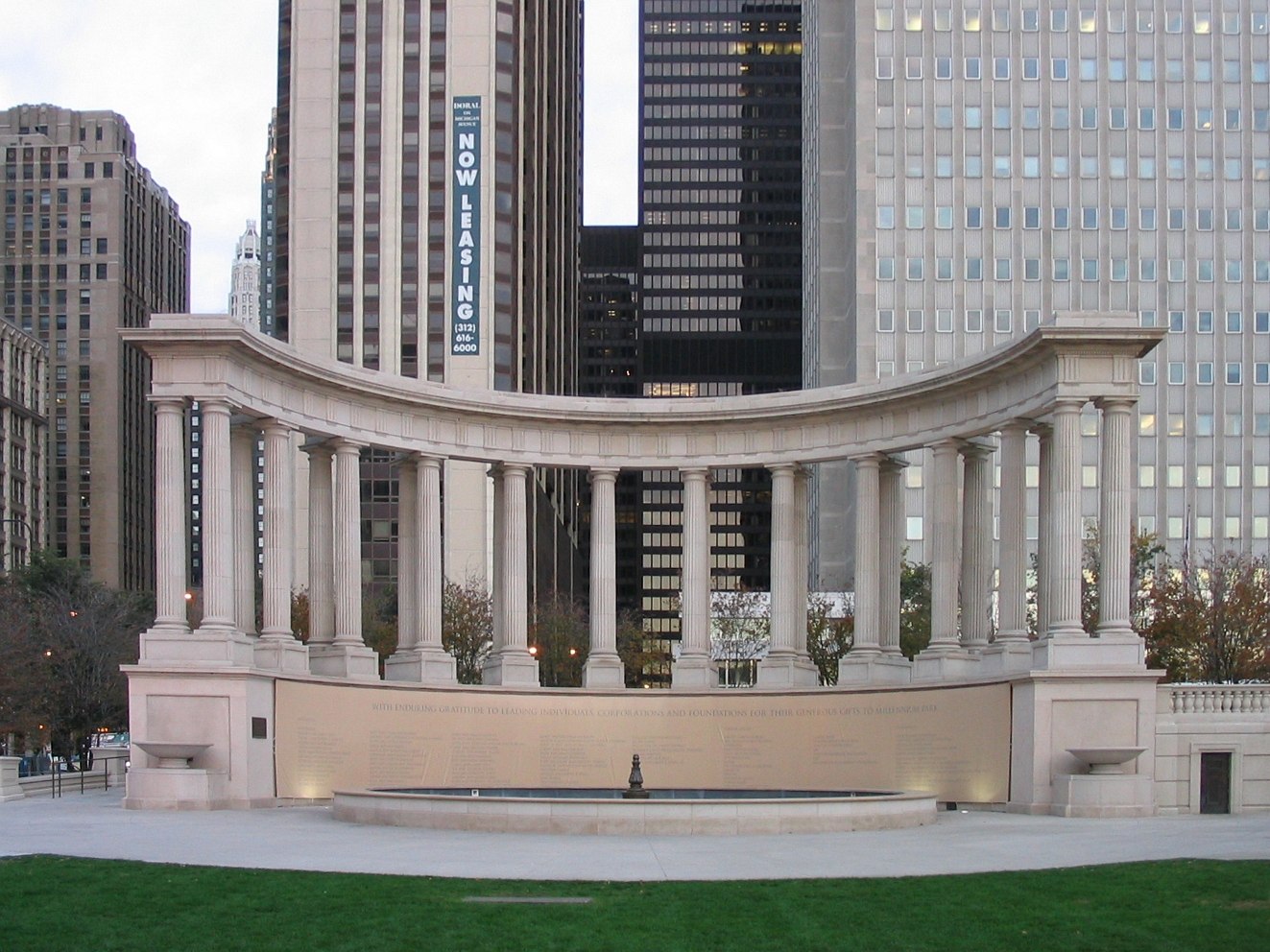
- Artists: O'Donnell, Wicklund, Pigozzi and Peterson Architects, Inc.
- Year: 2002
- Type: Limestone Peristyle sculpture
- Dimensions: 40 feet (12 m)
- Location: Millennium Park, Chicago, Illinois

A gift from the William Wrigley, Jr. Company, the limestone replica peristyle rises to a height of nearly 40 feet (12.2 m) (one source says the columns were planned to rise to 36 feet (11.0 m)), restoring a classical elegance to Grant Park. The William Wrigley, Jr. Foundation contributed $5 million to the monument, and the entire square, which cost $5 million to build, was named in its honor. The Millennium Monument is a tribute to the individual, corporate and foundation benefactors of Millennium Park. The pedestal of the peristyle is inscribed with the names of the 115 financial donors (including Oprah Winfrey) who made the 91 contributions of at least $1 million each to help pay for Millennium Park. The New York Times describes the pedestal as French marble, but other sources mention the use of French limestone. These 115 donors are referred to as the founders of Millennium Park in official park brochures published by the City of Chicago and distributed at the visitor's centers as well as in other press accounts. Their contributions not only paid for the construction of the park, but also provide for its ongoing conservation.

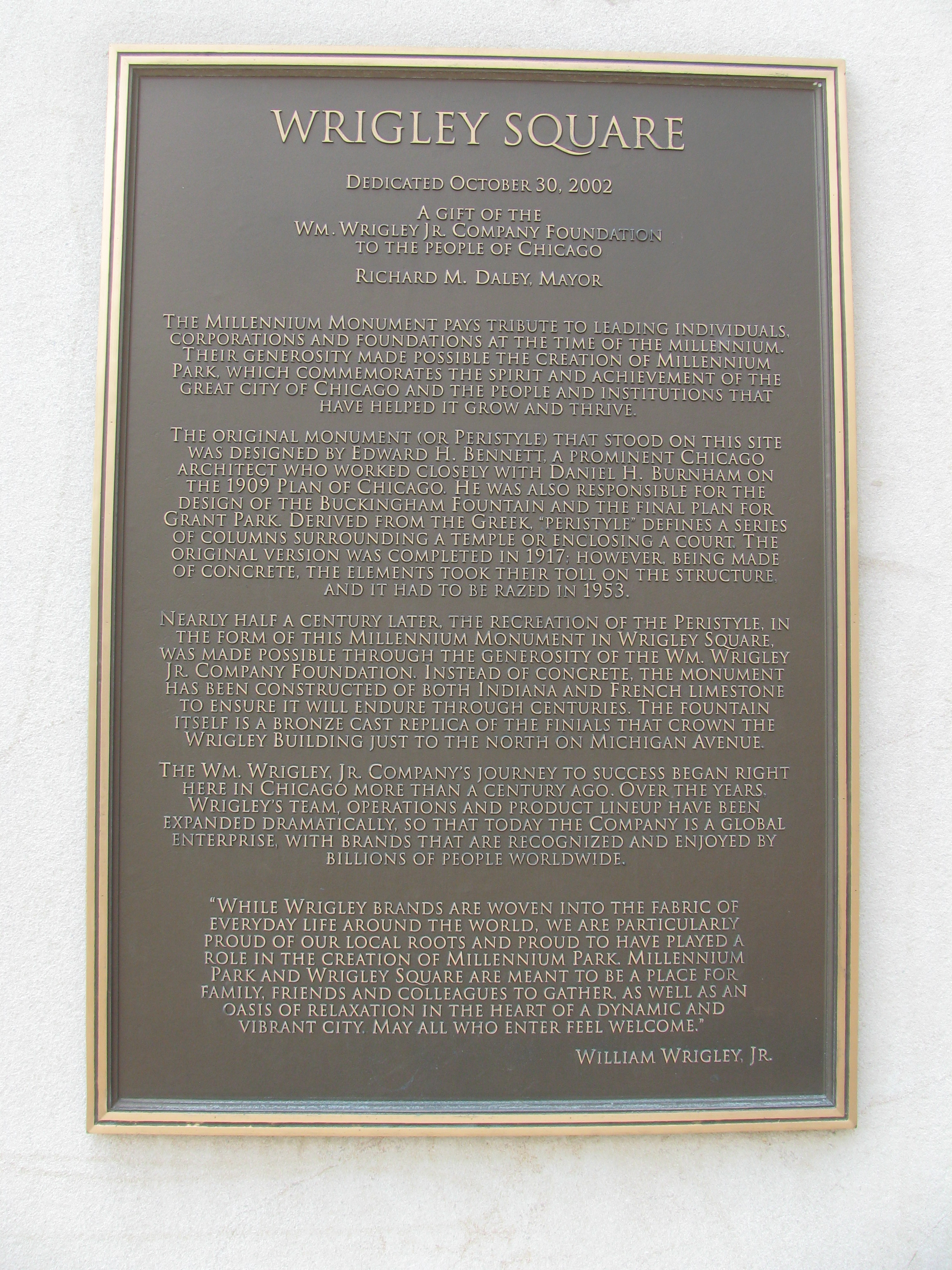
Millennium Monument plaque

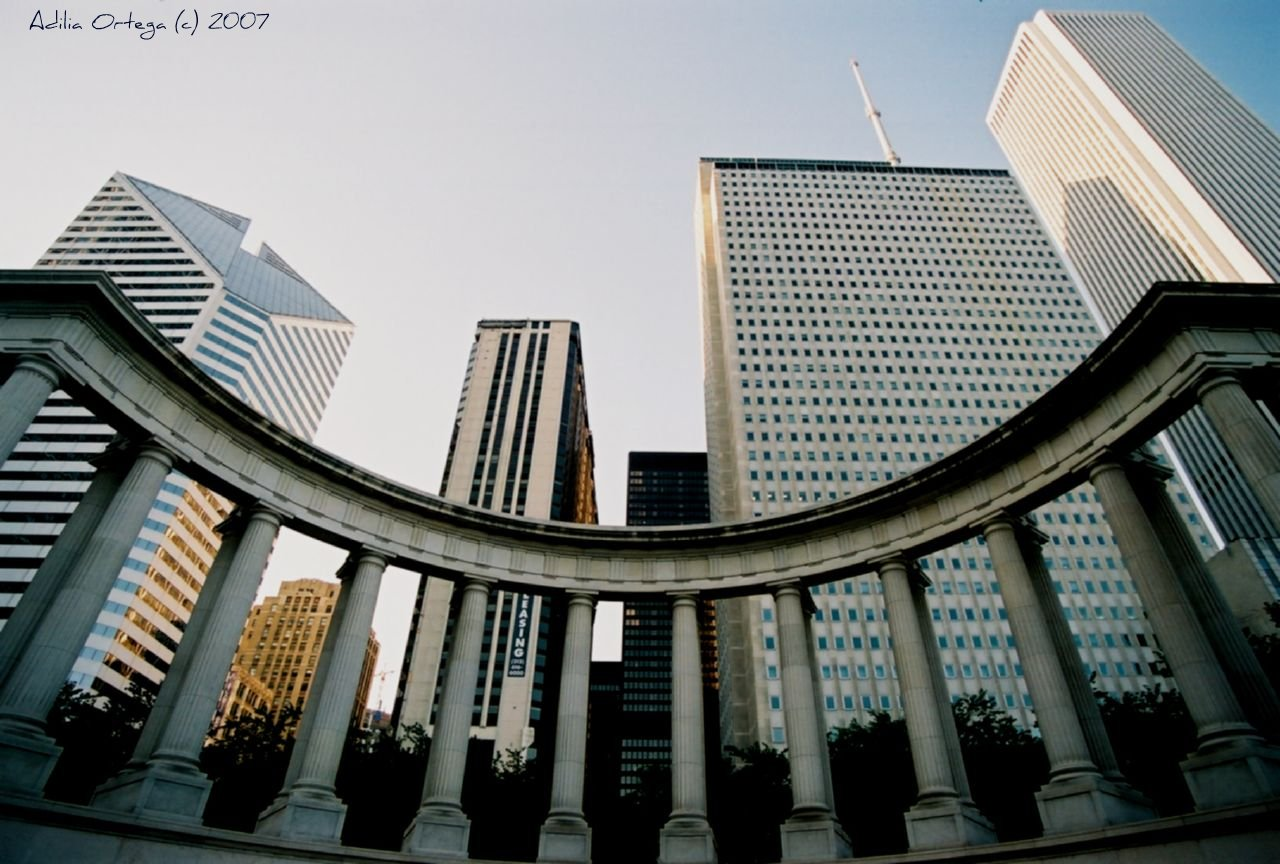
Monument with Crain Communications Building, One Prudential Plaza and Aon Center

The David Dillon and Michael Patrick Sullivan (of OWP&P) design is based on original drawings by Bennett found in the Chicago Park District's archive.

The naming rights of the space belong to Wm. Wrigley Jr, the foundation that created the world's famous chewing gum. Wrigley Company officials, including William Wrigley, Jr. II, wanted to contribute to Millennium Park, and the historic aspect of the peristyle was attractive to them partly because the original peristyle was constructed around the same time as the Wrigley Building, the corporate headquarters located a few blocks to the north, and because the classical architectural styles of both are similar.

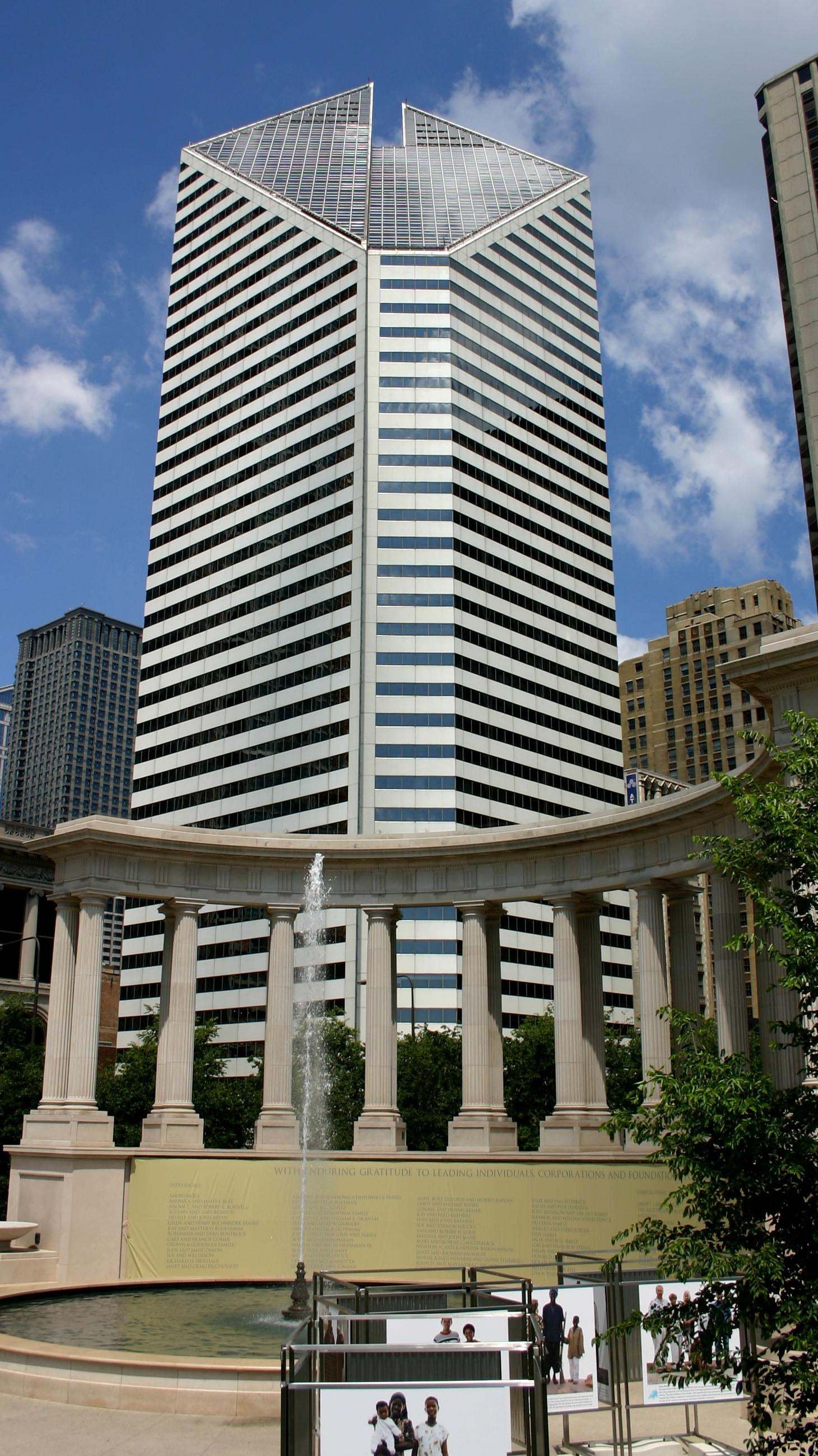
Viewed with Crain Communications Building

The 24 paired, fluted columns are the same height as the original peristyle. However, the structure was scaled down to an 80-foot (24.4 m) diameter in order to accommodate the accessible ramp that runs behind the monument. Each of the limestone columns is cut from an Indiana quarry and made of five 2,200 pounds (997.9 kg; 157.1 st) sections reinforced by steel rods and plates. The fountain in front of the monument is a bronze-cast replica of the finials that adorn the Wrigley Building. The brass spout was made from a mold of a terra cotta finial on the Wrigley Building.

The front of the monument has a dedication plaque (pictured left). In addition, on the reverse side in approximately the same location, the monument has a special plaque commemorating John H. Bryan's contribution as the head of fundraising for the Park.

The original model of the Millennium Monument was the starting point of the Peristyle appearance in Chicago. To this day, it is said to not compare to the once "commanding presence" that once stood in its place, before being demolished and replaced with an underground parking garage. The new monument was downsized by approximately 15% to accommodate a wheel-chair ramp for the disabled in a tight space. It also includes a "classical" take on the original, incorporating a fountain at the base of the limestone, Doric, column monument. The monument, despite being relatively small in comparison to the rest of Grant Park, makes its presence known as the central focus to shape Wrigley Square and the surrounding landscape. Wrigley Square is unique for its fountain that, unlike Buckingham Fountain, which is fenced off, remains open with a circular ledge to allow park-goers the freedom to sit next to the open water to enjoy the atmosphere.
