= Janoris Jenkins =

American football player (born 1988)

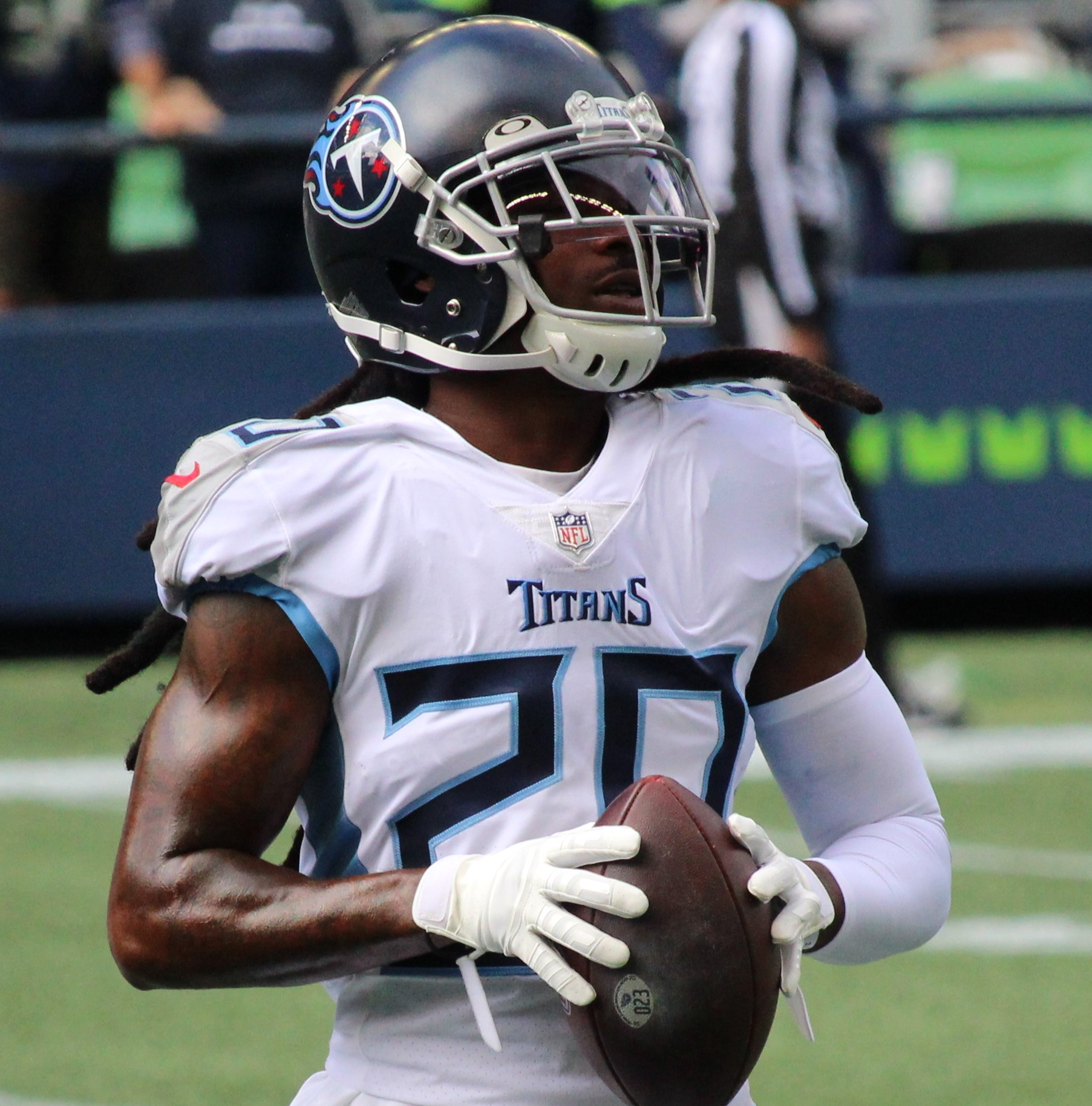
- Jenkins with the Tennessee Titans in 2021

No. 21, 20, 28
- Position: Cornerback

Personal information
- Born: October 29, 1988 (age 38); Pahokee, Florida, U.S.
- Listed height: 5 ft 10 in (1.78 m)
- Listed weight: 190 lb (86 kg)

Career information
- High school: Pahokee
- College: Florida (2008–2010); North Alabama (2011)
- NFL draft: 2012: 2nd round, 39th overall pick

Career history
- St. Louis Rams (2012–2015); New York Giants (2016–2019); New Orleans Saints (2019–2020); Tennessee Titans (2021); San Francisco 49ers (2022)

Awards and highlights
- Second-team All-Pro (2016); Pro Bowl (2016); PFWA All-Rookie Team (2012); BCS national champion (2008); First-team All-SEC (2010); NFL record: Most interceptions returned for touchdown in a season by a rookie: 3 (2012; tied) (Note: Tied with Ronnie Lott and Lem Barney)

Career NFL statistics
- Total tackles: 579
- Sacks: 2.0
- Forced fumbles: 7
- Fumble recoveries: 2
- Interceptions: 27
- Defensive touchdowns: 10
- Stats at Pro Football Reference

Janoris Jenkins (born October 29, 1988), nicknamed "Jackrabbit", is an American former professional football player who was a cornerback in the National Football League (NFL). He played college football for the North Alabama Lions and Florida Gators and was selected by the St. Louis Rams in the second round of the 2012 NFL draft. Jenkins had his most success as a member of the New York Giants, who he played four seasons with and made a Pro Bowl, and also had stints with the New Orleans Saints, Tennessee Titans and San Francisco 49ers.

== Early life ==
Jenkins attended Pahokee High School, and he played for the Pahokee Blue Devils football team and was teammates with Richard Ash and Merrill Noel. In his senior year, Pahokee went 14–0, beating Newberry 53–14 at the Florida Citrus Bowl for the 2008 FHSAA Class 2B State championship. Jenkins was recognized as a first-team Class 2B All-State selection and a Parade magazine All-American.

Rated a four-star recruit by Rivals.com, Jenkins was listed as the sixth-best cornerback prospect in the nation.

== College career ==
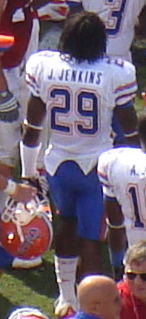
Jenkins with the Florida Gators in 2008

Jenkins accepted an athletic scholarship to attend the University of Florida, where he played for coach Urban Meyer's Florida Gators football team from 2008 to 2010. He became just the second true freshman in school history to start at cornerback in the season opener. He was named to College Football News and Sporting News′ Freshman All-American teams. Despite his strong on-the-field performance for the Gators over three seasons, Jenkins was kicked off the team after he was charged with possession of marijuana in April 2011.

Jenkins subsequently transferred and attended the University of North Alabama for his senior year, after signing an athletic grant-in-aid to play for the North Alabama Lions football team under head coach Terry Bowden.

== Professional career ==
=== Pre-draft ===
Prior to the combine, NFL analyst Mike Mayock ranked Jenkins as the second best cornerback prospect in the draft. He participated at the NFL Scouting Combine and completed the majority of combine drills, due to a shoulder injury that led him to skipping the bench press. On March 9, 2012, he participated at North Alabama's pro day and opted to only perform positional drills for team representatives and scouts. Following the pre-draft process, NFL analyst Mike Mayock ranked him as the third best cornerback in the draft. DraftScout.com ranked Jenkins as the fourth best cornerback prospect. His best attributes listed by scouts were his coverage skills, athleticism, explosiveness, and ability to read and react to plays. Scouts stated some concerns were due to past personal off-the-field issues, his smaller stature, and were concerned he could possibly not have the ability to adapt to the physicality of the pro game. NFL draft analysts projected him to be selected in the second round of the 2012 NFL Draft.

Pre-draft measurables
Height	Weight	Arm length	Hand span	Wingspan	40-yard dash	10-yard split	20-yard split	20-yard shuttle	Three-cone drill	Vertical jump	Broad jump
5 ft 10 in (1.78 m)	193 lb (88 kg)	32 in (0.81 m)	8 1/4 in (0.21 m)	6 ft 1 3/4 in (1.87 m)	4.46 s	1.55 s	2.58 s	4.13 s	6.95 s	33.5 in (0.85 m)	10 ft 1 in (3.07 m)
All values from NFL Combine

=== St. Louis Rams ===
==== 2012 ====
The St. Louis Rams selected Jenkins in the second round (39th overall) of the 2012 NFL draft. He was the fourth cornerback selected and the first of two cornerbacks the Rams drafted in 2012, along with third-round pick (65th overall) Trumaine Johnson. He became only the 16th player to be selected in the NFL Draft from North Alabama since 1967 and the first since the 1999 fourth-round pick (122nd overall) Bobby Collins and 1999 sixth-round pick (146th overall) Tyrone Bell. He is the second highest draft pick from North Alabama at 39th overall, only one selection behind 1986 second-round pick (38th overall) Lewis Billups. From 2000–2025, Jenkins still remains the only player drafted from North Alabama in going on 26 seasons.

On July 24, 2012, the St. Louis Rams signed Jenkins to a four-year, $4.99 million rookie contract, that included $2.93 million guaranteed and a signing bonus of $2.06 million.

The Rams were revamping their team following the hiring of Jeff Fisher as their head coach. The overhaul included the departures of Justin King, Josh Gordy, Al Harris, Roderick Hood, and Ron Bartell. Throughout training camp, Jenkins competed for a role as a starting cornerback against Trumaine Johnson, Cortland Finnegan, and Bradley Fletcher. Head coach Jeff Fisher named Jenkins a starting cornerback for the start of the season and paired him with Cortland Finnegan.

On September 9, 2012, Jenkins made his professional regular season debut and earned his first career start in the Rams' season-opener at the Detroit Lions and recorded six combined tackles (four solo), made one pass deflection, and had an interception on the opening drive, picking off a pass by Matthew Stafford to tight end Tony Scheffler as they lost, 27–23. On November 25, 2012, Jenkins made two solo tackles, two pass deflections, and set a career-high with two interceptions returned for touchdowns during a 31–17 victory at the Arizona Cardinals. He made the first pick-six of his career, intercepting a pass thrown by Ryan Lindley to running back LaRod Stephens-Howling and returned it for a 36–yard touchdown at the start of the second quarter. He became the first Rams player to ever return two interceptions for touchdowns in a single regular-season game. On December 2, 2012, Jenkins recorded five combined tackles (four solo) and recovered a fumble by Colin Kaepernick and returned it for a two–yard touchdown during a 13–16 comeback overtime victory against the San Francisco 49ers. In Week 15, he set a season-high with eight solo tackles during a 36–22 loss to the Minnesota Vikings. The following week, Jenkins made six solo tackles, one pass deflection, and set a career-high with his third touchdown of the season after intercepting a pass thrown by Josh Freeman to wide receiver Mike Williams during a 28–13 victory at the Tampa Bay Buccaneers in Week 16. He finished with a career-high 73 combined tackles (64 solo), 14 pass deflections, four interceptions, and led the league while setting a career-high with four defensive touchdowns in 15 games and 14 starts. He was named to the PFWA All-Rookie Team. His three interceptions returned for touchdowns as a rookie tied the NFL record and tied Chicago Bears' cornerback Charles Tillman for the most in 2012.

==== 2013 ====
The St. Louis Rams hired Tim Walton as their new defensive coordinator, replacing Gregg Williams who was suspended for the entire 2012 NFL season due to the bountygate scandal and was subsequently released following his suspension. Head coach Jeff Fisher retained Jenkins and Cortland Finnegan as the starting cornerbacks to begin the season.

On September 8, 2013, Jenkins started in the St. Louis Rams' home-opener against the Arizona Cardinals and recorded four solo tackles and set a season-high with three pass deflections during their 27–24 victory. On October 13, 2013, Jenkins made three combined tackles (two solo), one pass deflection, one interception, and made the first sack of his career on T. J. Yates for a one–yard loss during a 38–13 victory at the Houston Texans. He intercepted a pass thrown by T. J. Yates to tight end Garrett Graham to mark his only interception of the season. In Week 15, he set a season-high with six solo tackles during a 27–16 victory against the New Orleans Saints. He started in all 16 games throughout the 2013 with 61 combined tackles (55 solo), 14 pass deflections, one sack, and one interception.

==== 2014 ====
The St. Louis Rams hired Gregg Williams to return as their defensive coordinator following the departure of Tim Walton. Entering training camp, Jenkins was slated as the No. 1 starting cornerback following the departure of Cortland Finnegan and was expected to start alongside Trumaine Johnson. Head coach Jeff Fisher named Jenkins the No. 1 starting cornerback to begin the season, alongside E. J. Gaines who was promoted to a starter after Trumaine Johnson suffered a knee injury.

In Week 3, Jenkins made five solo tackles, one pass deflection, and had a pick-six after intercepting a pass thrown by Tony Romo to wide receiver Dez Bryant and returning it 25 yards for a touchdown during a 34–31 loss to the Dallas Cowboys. On October 19, 2014, he set a season-high with nine combined tackles (seven solo) and had a pass break-up during a 28–26 win against the Seattle Seahawks. He was inactive for two games (Weeks 8–9) due to a knee injury. On November 23, 2014, Jenkins recorded four combined tackles (three solo), made a pass deflection, forced a fumble, and returned an interception thrown by Philip Rivers to wide receiver Keenan Allen for a 99-yard touchdown during a 27–24 loss at the San Diego Chargers. He finished the 2014 season with 59 combined tackles (55 solo), five pass deflections, a forced fumble, two interceptions, and two touchdowns in 14 games and 13 starts. He was selected to the 2015 Pro Bowl as an alternate, for the first Pro Bowl selection of his career.

==== 2015 ====
He returned as the No. 1 starting cornerback, starting alongside Trumaine Johnson, to begin the season. On September 27, 2015, Jenkins set a season-high with nine combined tackles (seven solo), made a pass deflection, and intercepted a pass thrown by Ben Roethlisberger to wide receiver Markus Wheaton during a 12–6 loss to the Pittsburgh Steelers. The following week, he made five solo tackles, two pass deflections, and intercepted as pass by Carson Palmer to wide receiver John Brown during a 24–22 victory at the Arizona Cardinals in Week 4. In Week 13, Jenkins recorded six solo tackles before exiting during the third quarter of a 3–27 loss to the Arizona Cardinals after sustaining a concussion. During the second quarter, Jenkins was put through concussion protocol to check for symptoms after he collided with teammate T. J. McDonald while attempting to break up a pass to Michael Floyd. After clearing concussion protocol, Jenkins returned to the game, but was pulled in the third after he collided with Mark Barron as both of them were pursuing running back David Johnson. He was rendered inactive for the Rams' 21–14 win against the Detroit Lions in Week 14 as he was still not cleared to return from his concussion. He finished his final season with the Rams with a total of 64 combined tackles (56 solo), 16 pass deflections, and three interceptions in 15 games and 15 starts. He received an overall grade of 80.2 from Pro Football Focus, which ranked 25th amongst qualifying cornerbacks in 2015.

=== New York Giants ===
==== 2016 ====
On March 9, 2016, the New York Giants signed Jenkins to a five-year, $62.50 million contract that $28.80 million guaranteed and an initial signing bonus of $10.00 million. He was signed in order to replace Prince Amukamara who departed in free agency.

He entered training camp slated as the de facto No. 1 starting cornerback under defensive coordinator Steve Spagnuolo. Head coach Ben McAdoo named him the No. 1 starting cornerback to begin the season, starting alongside Dominique Rodgers-Cromartie and with Eli Apple and Trevin Wade as backups.

On September 18, 2016, he set a season-high with eight combined tackles (seven solo), made two pass deflections, and also scored a touchdown on special teams after a 38–yard field goal attempt by Wil Lutz was blocked by defensive tackle Johnathan Hankins, leading to the recovery by Jenkins and a 65–yard return during a 16–13 win against the New Orleans Saints. His performance earned him NFC Special Teams Player of the Week in Week 2 against the Saints. On October 9, 2016, Jenkins made two combined tackles (one solo), set a season-high with three pass deflections, and also had a season-high two interceptions on passes thrown by quarterback Aaron Rodgers during a 16–23 loss at the Green Bay Packers. He became the first player to have two interceptions in a game on Aaron Rodgers at Lambeau Field. In Week 14, Jenkins made two solo tackles, two pass deflections, and picked off a pass by Dak Prescott to wide receiver Dez Bryant as the Giants defeated the Dallas Cowboys 10–7. In Week 15, Jenkins made one tackle before exiting during the second quarter of a 17–6 win against the Detroit Lions due to a back injury he suffered after delivering a hit on tight end Eric Ebron that ended with teammate Trevin Wade's leg making impact across Jenkins' back. He remained inactive for the Giants' 24–19 loss at the Philadelphia Eagles in Week 16 due to his back injury. He finished the season with 49 combined tackles (44 solo), a career-high 18 pass deflections, one sack, and three interceptions in 15 games and 15 starts. He was selected as a starting cornerback for the 2017 Pro Bowl and also received second-team All-Pro honors. He was ranked 54th by his peers on the NFL Top 100 Players of 2017. Jenkins was the first former North Alabama Lions player to be selected to the Pro Bowl since Harlon Hill in 1956.

The New York Giants finished the 2016 NFL season in second place in the NFC East with an 11–5 record, earning a Wild-Card berth. On January 8, 2017, he played in his first career playoff game, making only one tackle during the Giants' 38–13 loss to the Green Bay Packers in the Wild Card Round.

==== 2017 ====
He returned as the de facto No. 1 starting cornerback and was paired with Eli Apple. He was inactive as the Giants lost, 24–10 to the Detroit Lions, due to a sprained ankle. On October 15, 2017, Jenkins set a season-high with six solo tackles, a pass deflection, and intercepted a pass thrown by Trevor Siemian to wide receiver Bennie Fowler and returned it for a 43–yard touchdown during a 23–10 win at the Denver Broncos.

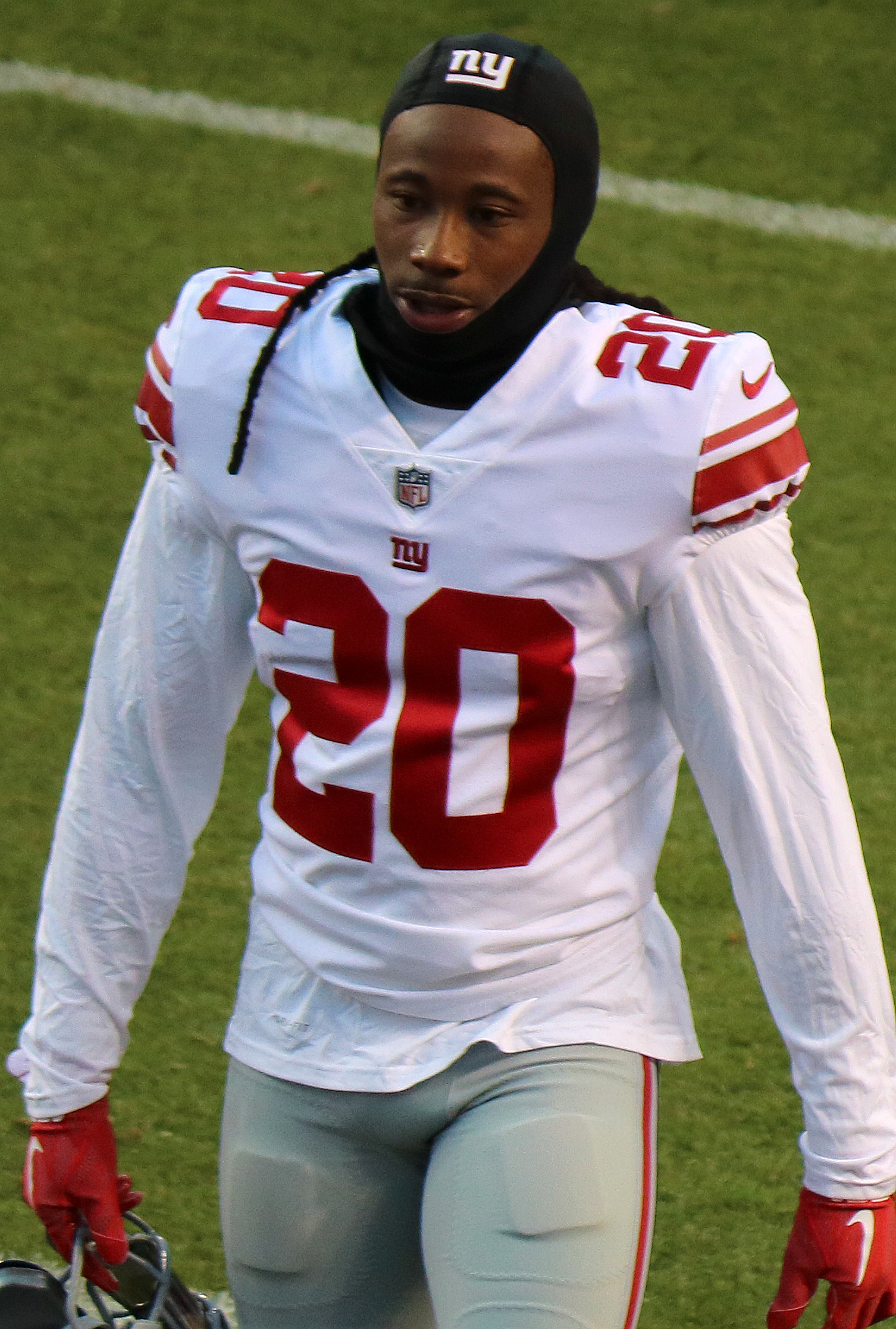
Jenkins in a game against the Denver Broncos

On October 31, 2017, Jenkins was suspended indefinitely by the Giants for violating team rules. On November 7, 2017, the Giants reinstated Jenkins from his suspension after missing their 51–17 loss against the Los Angeles Rams in Week 9. In Week 11, Jenkins made five combined tackles (four solo), one pass deflection, and helped the Giants secure a 9–12 overtime win against the Kansas City Chiefs by intercepting a pass thrown by Alex Smith to wide receiver Demarcus Robinson with 2:18 remaining in the fourth quarter. In Week 12, Jenkins had two pass deflections and made his second pick-six of the season, intercepting a pass thrown by Kirk Cousins to running back Byron Marshall as the Giants lost, 20–10, at the Washington Redskins. On November 29, 2017, the Giants officially placed Jenkins on season-ending injured reserve due to an ankle injury, requiring surgery. He remained inactive for the last five games (Weeks 13–17) of the season. On December 4, 2017, the Giants fired head coach Ben McAdoo after they fell to a 3–10 record and chose to appoint Steve Spagnuolo to interim head coach. He finished the 2017 NFL season with 31 combined tackles (27 solo), three interceptions (of which two were returned for a touchdown), nine passes defensed, and one forced fumble in nine games and nine starts.

==== 2018 ====
The New York Giants hired Pat Shurmur to be their new head coach. Defensive coordinator James Bettcher retained Jenkins and Eli Apple as the starting cornerbacks to begin the season. On September 9, 2018, Jenkins started in the New York Giants' home-opener against the Jacksonville Jaguars and made seven combined tackles (five solo), two pass deflections, and intercepted a pass thrown by Blake Bortles to wide receiver Donte Moncrief as they lost 15–20. On October 23, 2018, the Giants traded Eli Apple to the New Orleans Saint. The Giants named B. W. Webb as his replacement as a starting cornerback, pairing with Jenkins for the remaining ten games (Weeks 8–17). On December 2, 2018, he recorded two solo tackles and set a season-high with three pass deflections during a 20–17 overtime victory against the Chicago Bears. In Week 17, he set a season-high with eight combined tackles (six solo) and made two pass deflections during a 36–35 loss against the Dallas Cowboys. He started all 16 games throughout the 2018 NFL season and finished with 70 combined tackles (59 solo), 15 pass deflections, two interceptions, and a forced fumble.

==== 2019 ====
He entered training camp slated as the de facto No. 1 starting cornerback following the departure of Eli Apple. Head coach Pat Shurmur named Jenkins the No. 1 starting cornerback to begin the season, alongside 2019 first–round pick (30th overall) Deandre Baker.

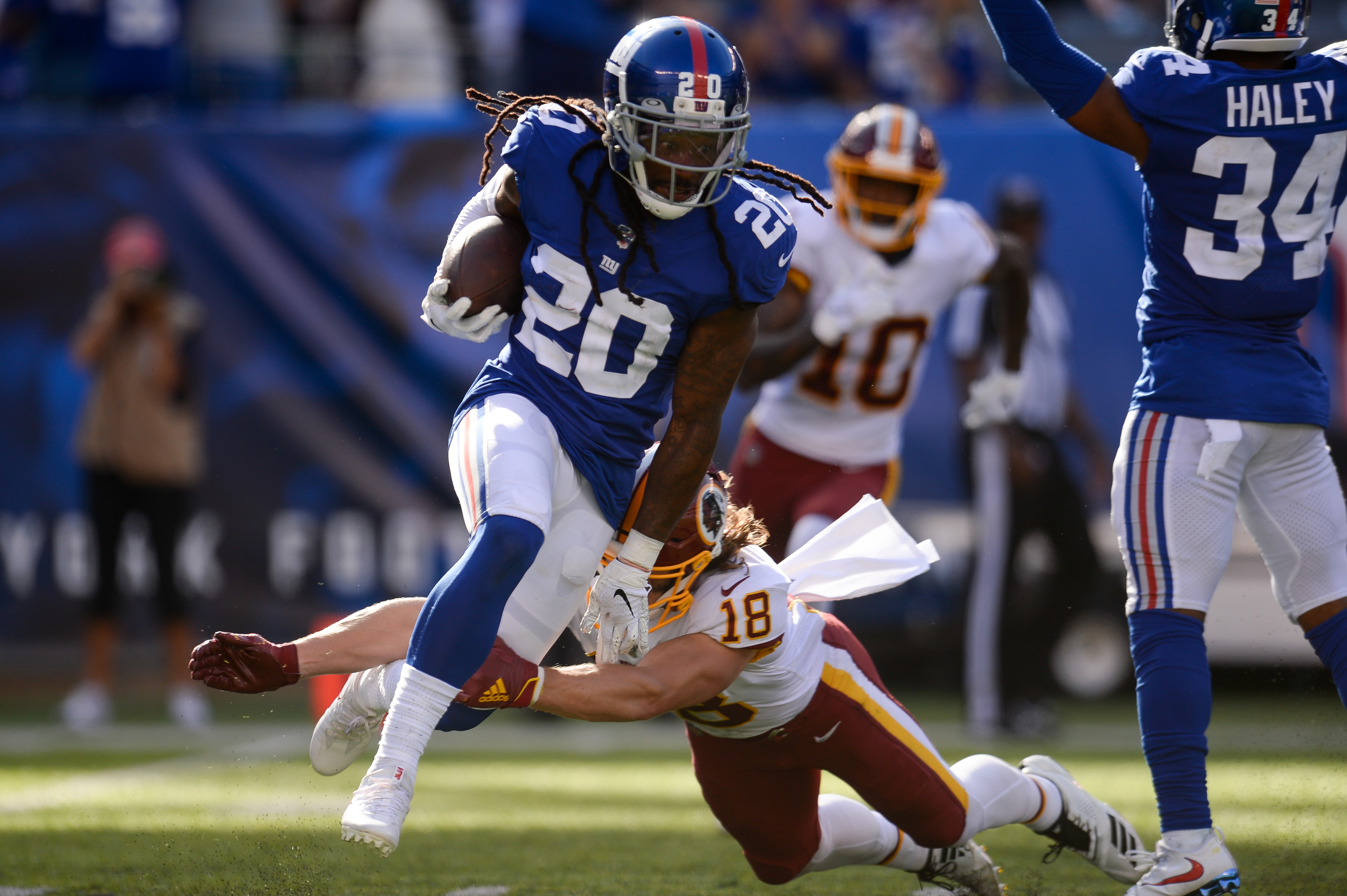
Jenkins in a game against the Washington Redskins

In Week 2, Jenkins set a season-high with seven solo tackles during a 28–14 loss to the Buffalo Bills. On September 29, 2019, Jenkins made two solo tackles, three pass deflections, and set a season-high with two interceptions on passes thrown by rookie Dwayne Haskins during a 24–3 victory against the Washington Redskins. His Week 4 performance earned him NFC Defensive Player of the Week. In Week 6, he made three solo tackles, two pass deflections, and intercepted a pass thrown by Tom Brady to wide receiver Julian Edelman, returning it for a season-high 62–yards as the Giants lost, 35–14, at the New England Patriots. In Week 8, he made three solo tackles, one pass break-up, and had his last interception as part of the Giants on a pass thrown by Matthew Stafford to wide receiver Marvin Jones during a 32–26 loss at the Detroit Lions. On December 13, 2019, the Giants removed Jenkins from the active roster and placed him on waivers as waived/injured following an incident on Twitter where Jenkins replied to another user calling them a "retard". Through 13 starts with the Giants in 3019, he finished with 54 combined tackles (45 solo), 14 pass deflections, and made four interceptions.

=== New Orleans Saints ===
==== 2019 ====
On December 16, 2019, the New Orleans Saints claimed Jenkins off waivers. Upon his arrival, head coach Sean Payton named Jenkins a backup cornerback and listed him as the fourth cornerback on the depth chart, behind Marshon Lattimore, P. J. Williams, and Patrick Robinson. He was reunited with former Giants teammate Eli Apple.

On December 29, 2019, Jenkins earned his first start with the Saints and made five solo tackles, two pass deflections, and intercepted a pass thrown by Kyle Allen to wide receiver DeAndrew White during a 42–10 victory at the Carolina Panthers. He appeared in two games with the Saints with one start and recorded seven combined tackles (five solo), made two pass deflections, and had one interception.

The New Orleans Saints finished the 2019 NFL season in first place in the NFC South with a 13–3 record to clinch a playoff berth. On January 5, 2020, Jenkins started in the NFC Wild Card Game and made eight combined tackles (five solo), was credited with half a sack, and forced a fumble by wide receiver Adam Thielen that was recovered by teammate Vonn Bell as the Saints lost in overtime 26–20 against the Minnesota Vikings.

==== 2020 ====
On March 23, 2020, the New Orleans Saints signed Jenkins to a two—year, $16.75 million contract extension that included $11.20 million guaranteed and a signing bonus of $9.00 million.

He entered training camp as the top candidate for the job as the No. 2 starting cornerback following the departure of Eli Apple. Under defensive coordinator Dennis Allen he competed for the role against P. J. Williams and Patrick Robinson. Head coach Sean Payton named Jenkins and Marshon Lattimore the starting cornerbacks to begin the season.

On September 13, 2020, Jenkins started in the Saints' home-opener against the Tampa Bay Buccaneers and set a season-high with nine combined tackles (eight solo), made one pass deflection, and had a pick-six after intercepting a pass thrown by Tom Brady to wide receiver Justin Watson and returned in 36–yards for a touchdown as they won 34–23. He was sidelined for two games (Weeks 4–5) after sustaining an injury to his shoulder. In Week 11, Jenkins recorded five combined tackles (four solo), set a career-high with five pass deflections, and intercepted a pass by Matt Ryan to wide receiver Calvin Ridley during a 24–9 win against the Atlanta Falcons. The following week, Jenkins had one pass break-up and intercepted a pass thrown by wide receiver Kendall Hinton to wide receiver DaeSean Hamilton during a 31–3 victory at the Denver Broncos in Week 12. He injured his knee after making the interception and exited in the second quarter. He was inactive as the Saints won 21–16 at the Atlanta Falcons in Week 13. He finished the season with 55 combined tackles (44 solo), 12 pass deflections, three interceptions, and one touchdown in 13 games and 13 starts.

On March 11, 2021, the New Orleans Saints officially released Jenkins prior to the start of the new NFL year.

=== Tennessee Titans ===
On March 19, 2021, the Tennessee Titans signed Jenkins to a two—year, $15.00 million contract that included $7.50 million guaranteed and a signing bonus of $6.40 million.

He entered training camp as a candidate to earn the role as the No. 1 starting cornerback, but had to compete against Kristian Fulton, Kevin Johnson, and Caleb Farley following the departures of Malcolm Butler, Adoree Jackson, and Johnathan Joseph. Head coach Mike Vrabel named Jenkins and Kristian Fulton the starting cornerbacks to begin the season.

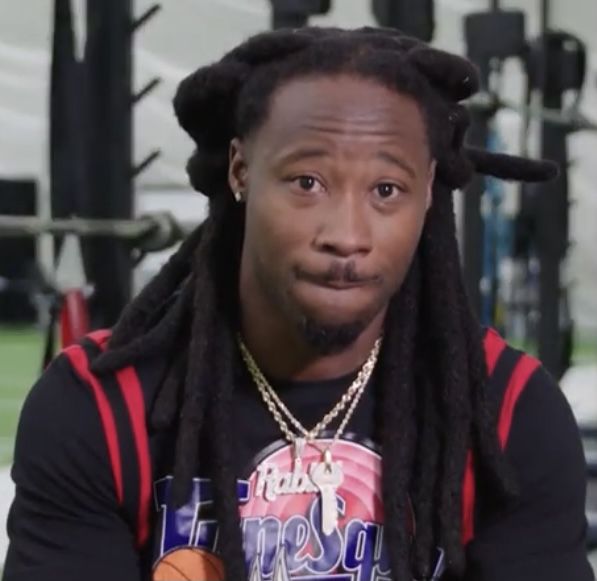
Jenkins in 2021

On September 12, 2021, Jenkins started in the Tennessee Titans' home-opener against the Arizona Cardinals and set a season-high with eight solo tackles as they lost, 38–13. He was inactive during the Titans' 22–13 loss to the Houston Texans in Week 11 after suffering an injury to his chest. He was also sidelined for two games (Weeks 14–15) after suffering an ankle injury. On December 23, 2021, Jenkins made one tackle, one pass deflection, and had his lone interception of the season on a pass thrown by Jimmy Garoppolo to tight end George Kittle during a 20–17 win against the San Francisco 49ers. He finished the 2021 NFL season with 54 combined tackles (38 solo), six pass deflections, one forced fumble, and had one interception in 14 games and 13 starts.

On March 15, 2022, the Tennessee Titans officially released Jenkins with one—year remaining on his contract.

=== San Francisco 49ers ===
On November 28, 2022, the San Francisco 49ers signed Jenkins to their practice squad. He was signed in order to provide a capable starter if necessary after both Jason Verrett and Emmanuel Moseley were both placed on injured reserve. Upon a promotion to the active roster in Week 13, head coach Kyle Shanahan named Jenkins a backup and listed him as the sixth cornerback on the depth chart behind Deommodore Lenoir, Charvarius Ward, Ambry Thomas, Samuel Womack, and Dontae Johnson. On December 11, 2022, the 49ers placed Dontae Johnson on injured reserve due to a torn ACL and in lieu, promoted Jenkins to the third cornerback on the depth chart entering Week 15. In Week 15, he recorded two solo tackles during a 21–13 victory at the Seattle Seahawks. He was inactive as a healthy scratch for the next two games (Weeks 16–17). He finished the 2022 NFL season with only three combined tackles (two solo) in two games.

On January 29, 2023, Jenkins practice squad contract expired following the 49ers elimination from the playoffs.

== Career statistics ==
=== NFL ===
Legend
	Led the league
**Bold**	Career best

Year	Team	Games		Tackles				Interceptions					Fumbles	
Year	Team	GP	GS	Cmb	Solo	Ast	Sck	Int	Yds	Lng	TD	PD	FF	TD
2012	STL	15	14	**73**	**64**	9	0.0	**4**	**150**	41	**3**	14	0	**1**
2013	STL	**16**	**16**	61	55	6	**1.0**	1	5	5	0	14	0	0
2014	STL	14	13	59	55	4	0.0	2	124	**99**	2	5	**2**	0
2015	STL	15	15	64	56	8	0.0	3	0	0	0	15	1	0
2016	NYG	15	15	49	44	5	**1.0**	3	26	23	0	**18**	1	0
2017	NYG	9	9	31	27	4	0.0	3	113	53	2	9	1	0
2018	NYG	**16**	15	70	59	11	0.0	2	29	29	0	15	1	0
2019	NYG	13	13	54	45	9	0.0	**4**	84	62	0	14	0	0
2019	NO	2	1	7	5	2	0.0	1	0	0	0	2	0	0
2020	NO	13	13	55	44	11	0.0	3	53	36	1	12	0	0
2021	TEN	14	13	54	38	**16**	0.0	1	0	0	0	6	1	0
2022	SF	2	0	3	2	1	0.0	0	0	—	0	0	0	0
Career		144	138	579	493	86	2.0	27	584	99	8	124	7	1

=== College ===
Season	Team	Conf	Class	Pos	GP	Tackles					Interceptions			
Season	Team	Conf	Class	Pos	GP	Solo	Ast	Cmb	TfL	Sck	Int	Yds	Avg	TD
2008	Florida	SEC	FR	DB	14	27	12	39	1.0	1.0	3	19	6.3	0
2009	Florida	SEC	SO	DB	13	33	5	38	3.0	0.0	2	4	2.0	0
2010	Florida	SEC	JR	DB	13	32	12	44	5.5	1.0	3	68	22.7	1
Career					40	92	29	121	9.5	2.0	8	91	11.4	1

== Personal life ==
On June 1, 2009, Jenkins was arrested near a bar by Gainesville police for fighting and resisting arrest after punching a man in the head at approximately 2:00 a.m. Police were forced to use a taser on Jenkins after fighting escalated. When asked why the fight started, Jenkins told police it was because he thought someone was going to steal the gold chain from around his neck.

On April 23, 2011, Jenkins was cited by a Gainesville police officer and charged with misdemeanor marijuana possession. He was cited for the same violation in January 2011, and paid a $316 fine. On April 26, 2011, he was dismissed by the Florida Gators football team, due to his second drug related arrest in three months.

On June 26, 2018, a dead body was found in the basement of Jenkins' New Jersey home, identified as a family friend who had been living at the house. Jenkins' brother was identified as a person of interest.

Jenkins is the cousin of former NFL linebacker Pernell McPhee. He goes by the nickname "Jackrabbit".
