= Jason Brownlee =

American football player (born 1999)

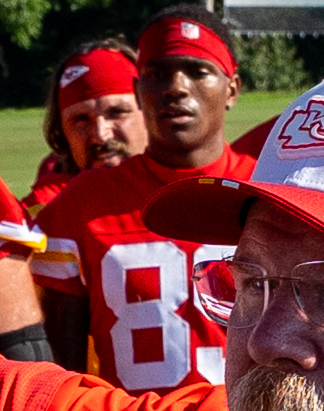
- Brownlee in 2025

No. 89 – Tennessee Titans
- Position: Wide receiver
- Roster status: Practice squad

Personal information
- Born: January 30, 1999 (age 27); West Point, Mississippi, U.S.
- Listed height: 6 ft 2 in (1.88 m)
- Listed weight: 202 lb (92 kg)

Career information
- High school: West Point
- College: East Mississippi (2018–2019); Southern Miss (2020–2022)
- NFL draft: 2023: undrafted

Career history
- New York Jets (2023–2024); Kansas City Chiefs (2024–2025); New York Giants (2026)*; Tennessee Titans (2026–present)*
- * Offseason or practice squad member only

Awards and highlights
- Second-team All-Conference USA (2021); Third-team All-Sun Belt (2022)

Career NFL statistics as of 2025
- Receptions: 5
- Receiving yards: 56
- Receiving average: 11.2
- Receiving touchdowns: 1
- Stats at Pro Football Reference

Jason Brownlee (born January 30, 1999) is an American professional football wide receiver for the Tennessee Titans of the National Football League (NFL). Brownlee has played for the New York Jets and Kansas City Chiefs. He played college football for the Southern Miss Golden Eagles.

== Early life ==
Brownlee grew up in West Point, Mississippi and attended West Point High School. He was named first-team All-State by The Clarion-Ledger as a senior after catching 42 passes for 967 yards and 11 touchdowns while West Point won the Class 5A state championship in 2017.

== College career ==
Brownlee began his college football career at East Mississippi Community College. He caught 14 passes for 113 yards and a touchdown during his freshman season as the Lions won the 2018 NJCAA National Championship. Brownlee had 75 catches for 1,055 yards and 12 touchdowns as a sophomore. Brownlee initially committed to transfer to Charlotte, but later flipped his commitment to Southern Miss.

Brownlee led the Southern Miss Golden Eagles with 34 receptions, 610 receiving yards, and five touchdown catches in his first season with the team. He again led the team in receiving and was named second-team All-Conference USA after catching 46 passes for 643 yards and eight touchdowns in 2021. As a senior, Brownlee had 55 receptions for 891 yards and eight touchdowns.

== Professional career ==
Pre-draft measurables
Height	Weight	Arm length	Hand span	Wingspan	40-yard dash	10-yard split	20-yard split	20-yard shuttle	Three-cone drill	Vertical jump	Broad jump	Bench press
6 ft 2 in (1.88 m)	198 lb (90 kg)	33 3/4 in (0.86 m)	9 3/4 in (0.25 m)	6 ft 8 3/8 in (2.04 m)	4.59 s	1.52 s	2.62 s	4.32 s	6.91 s	39.5 in (1.00 m)	10 ft 11 in (3.33 m)	16 reps
All values from NFL Combine/Pro Day

=== New York Jets ===
Brownlee was signed by the New York Jets as an undrafted free agent on May 5, 2023. He made the Jets' 53 man initial roster out of training camp. In Week 12 against the Miami Dolphins, Brownlee recorded his first NFL receptions, catching both targets from Tim Boyle for 20 yards. In Week 16, Brownlee caught his first professional touchdown from Trevor Siemian against the Washington Commanders.

On August 28, 2024, Brownlee was waived by the Jets and re-signed to the practice squad.

=== Kansas City Chiefs ===
On January 15, 2025, Brownlee was signed to the Kansas City Chiefs' practice squad. He signed a reserve/future contract with Kansas City on February 11. On October 13, Brownlee was waived by the Chiefs; he was re-signed to the practice squad two days later. On January 26, 2026, he signed a reserve/futures contract with the Chiefs.

On August 30, 2026, Brownlee was waived by the Chiefs as a part of final roster cuts.

=== New York Giants ===
On October 20, 2026, Brownlee signed with the New York Giants practice squad, reuniting himself with his former offensive coordinator Matt Nagy. On October 27, he was released.

=== Tennessee Titans ===
On November 16, 2026, Brownlee signed with the Tennessee Titans practice squad.
