= John H. Bryan =

American businessman

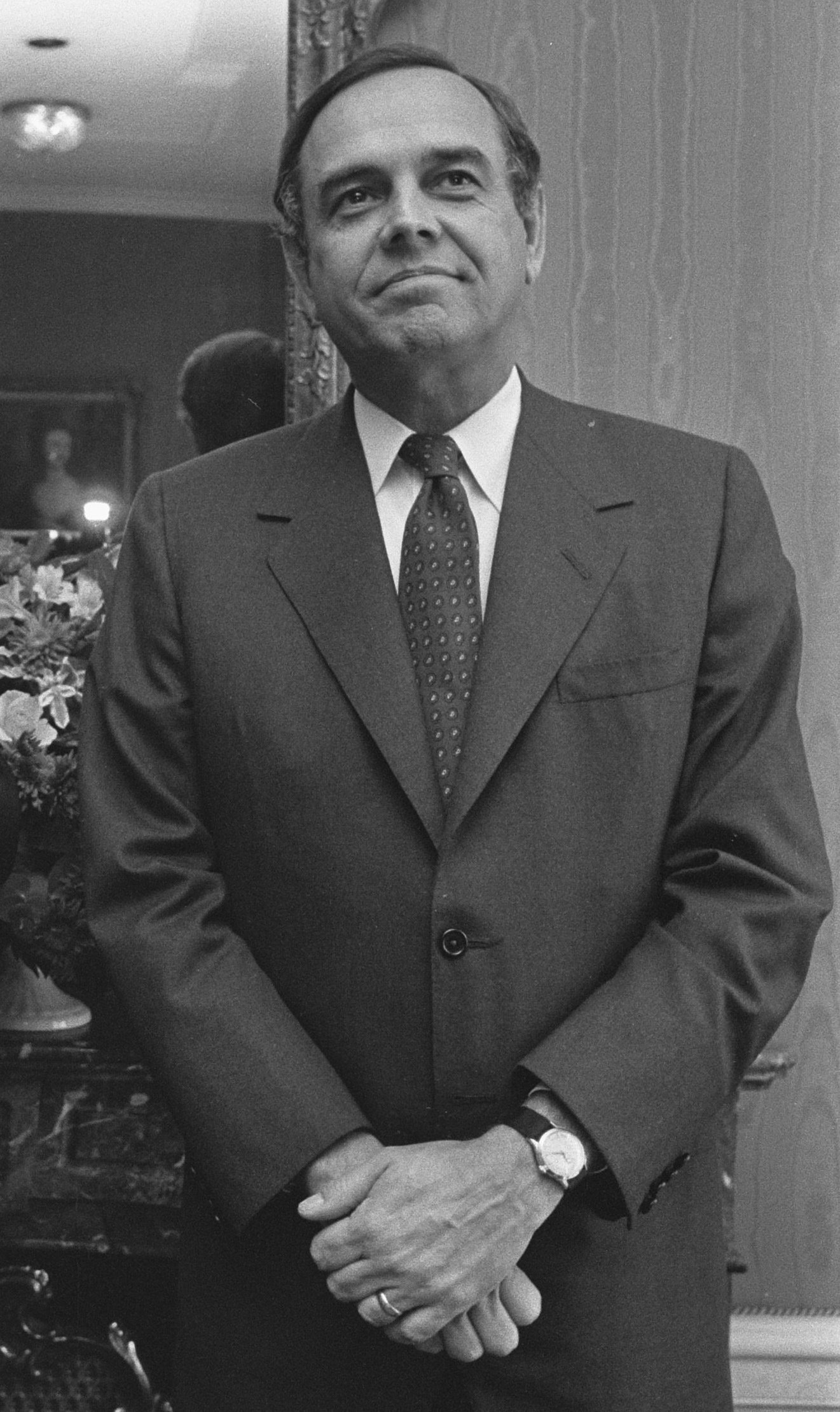

CEO and chairman of Sara Lee Corporation
- In office 1975–2001

Personal details
- Born: John Henry Bryan Jr. October 5, 1936 West Point, Mississippi, United States
- Died: October 1, 2018 (aged 81) Lake Bluff, Illinois, United States
- Education: Mississippi State University, Rhodes College

John Henry Bryan Jr. (October 5, 1936 – October 1, 2018) was an American businessman who was the chairman and CEO of Sara Lee Corporation from 1975 until 2001. He also was the philanthropic driving force behind the creation of Millennium Park in Chicago.

== Early life and education ==
John Henry Bryan Jr. was born on October 5, 1936, in West Point, Mississippi, to John Henry Bryan Sr. and Catherine (Kitty) Wilkerson Bryan. He has three siblings: George W. Bryan, also a successful businessman, Caroline Bryan Harrell, and the late Catherine Bryan Dill. He attended Mississippi State University and graduated with a BA in Economics and Business from Rhodes College in Memphis, Tennessee.

== Professional career ==
After college, Bryan led his family's specialty meat business Bryan Foods, which he sold to Chicago-based Consolidated Foods in 1968. He stayed on overseeing the family's business as a unit of Consolidated Foods, and Consolidated Foods made him the company's president in 1974 and its CEO in 1975.

From 1975 to 2000, he served as CEO of the Sara Lee Corporation, which changed its name from Consolidated Foods to Sara Lee Corporation in 1985. He sat on the Board of Directors of Goldman Sachs, where he served as Lead Director. Previously, he sat on the Board of the Bank One Corporation, Amoco, BP and General Motors.

He sat on the Boards of Trustees of the University of Chicago and the Art Institute of Chicago. He also served as Chairman of the Board of Millennium Park in Chicago. He was a member of the Council on Foreign Relations, the Trilateral Commission, the Chicago Council on Global Affairs, The Business Council, the World Economic Forum, the Bilderberg Group and Americans United to Save the Arts and Humanities. A Democrat, he has supported Bill Bradley, Hillary Clinton and Barack Obama. He was a recipient of the French Legion of Honor.

From 1984 until his death, Bryan lived on Crab Tree Farm in Lake Bluff, Illinois. The farm has cattle, horses, sheep, chickens, and turkeys, and it grows hay, corn, and soybeans. He died in 2018 of lung cancer.

== Philanthropy ==
Bryan was known for raising money for building expansion and renovation projects for the Lyric Opera of Chicago, the Chicago Symphony Orchestra and the Art Institute of Chicago. He also helped raise more than $200 million in private funding for Millennium Park in Chicago, and raised key funding to preserve the Farnsworth House in Plano, Illinois.

His leadership in the efforts to build Millennium Park are honored with a plaque on the Millennium Monument in Wrigley Square in the park's northwest corner.
