= List of North Alabama Lions in the NFL draft =

This is a list of North Alabama Lions football players in the NFL draft.

== Key ==
B	Back	K	Kicker	NT	Nose tackle
C	Center	LB	Linebacker	FB	Fullback
DB	Defensive back	P	Punter	HB	Halfback
DE	Defensive end	QB	Quarterback	WR	Wide receiver
DT	Defensive tackle	RB	Running back	G	Guard
E	End	T	Offensive tackle	TE	Tight end

== Selections ==
Year	Round	Overall	Player	Team	Position
1954	15	174	Harlon Hill	Chicago Bears	E
1956	28	334	Billy Hicks	Washington Redskins	B
1958	30	357	Billy Lumpkin	New York Giants	E
1980	5	128	William Bowens	Oakland Raiders	LB
1980	8	219	Curtis Sirmones	San Diego Chargers	RB
1980	12	327	Marcene Emmett	Washington Redskins	DB
1981	11	284	Jerry Hill	Washington Redskins	WR
1985	9	249	Daryl Smith	Denver Broncos	DB
1986	2	38	Lewis Billups	Cincinnati Bengals	DB
1986	7	194	Bruce Jones	Chicago Bears	DB
1986	11	282	Billy Witt	Buffalo Bills	DE
1988	6	163	Shawn Lee	Tampa Bay Buccaneers	DT
1988	12	324	Wendell Phillips	San Diego Chargers	DB
1996	5	163	Israel Raybon	Pittsburgh Steelers	DE
1996	7	212	Jarius Hayes	Arizona Cardinals	TE
1996	7	233	Marcus Keyes	Chicago Bears	DT
1999	4	122	Bobby Collins	Buffalo Bills	TE
1999	6	178	Tyrone Bell	San Diego Chargers	DB
2012	2	39	Janoris Jenkins	St. Louis Rams	DB
