= David Gibbs (politician) =

American politician

Member of the Mississippi House of Representatives from the 36th district
- In office January 1992 – January 2013
- Preceded by: H. Scott Ross
- Succeeded by: Karl Gibbs

Personal details
- Born: May 28, 1936 West Point, Mississippi, U.S.
- Died: January 13, 2013 (aged 76) Tupelo, Mississippi, U.S.
- Party: Democratic

David Gibbs (May 28, 1936 – January 13, 2013) was an American politician.

Born in West Point, Mississippi, Gibbs served in the Mississippi House of Representatives, as a Democrat, representing District 36 which covers parts of Clay, Lowndes, and Monroe counties, from 1992 until his death. Gibbs is a former chairman of the House County Affairs Committee. He resigned from office just a week before his death from cancer at Northeast Mississippi Medical Center in Tupelo, Mississippi.

Gibbs was a loan broker and consultant. He went to Faulkner University, Mississippi State University, and Kentucky State University. He served on the Clay County, Mississippi county board of supervisors. He was also a member of the State Democratic Executive Committee in Mississippi.
