= Lyndon Johnson (American football) =

American football player (born 1994)

No. 92, 79, 75, 96
- Position: Defensive end

Personal information
- Born: May 23, 1994 (age 32); West Point, Mississippi, U.S.
- Listed height: 6 ft 5 in (1.96 m)
- Listed weight: 287 lb (130 kg)

Career information
- High school: West Point
- College: Cincinnati
- NFL draft: 2018: undrafted

Career history
- Jacksonville Jaguars (2018); Tennessee Titans (2019)*; Indianapolis Colts (2019)*; Arizona Cardinals (2019–2020)*
- * Offseason or practice squad member only

Career NFL statistics
- Total tackles: 2
- Stats at Pro Football Reference

Lyndon Baines Johnson Jr. (born May 23, 1994) is an American former professional football player who was a defensive end in the National Football League (NFL). He played college football for the Cincinnati Bearcats.

== College career ==
Johnson began his college career at Holmes Community College, where he played both football and basketball for two seasons before transferring to the University of Cincinnati. Johnson played in 26 games at defensive tackle for the Bearcats in his final two seasons of eligibility and recorded 31 tackles, four tackles for a loss, three sacks and one forced fumble.

== Professional career ==
=== Jacksonville Jaguars ===
Johnson signed with the Jacksonville Jaguars as an undrafted free agent on April 30, 2018. He was cut by the Jaguars at the end of the preseason and subsequently re-signed to the team's practice squad on September 2, 2018. Johnson was promoted to the Jaguars active roster on December 14, 2018. He made his NFL debut on December 16, 2018, in a 16–13 loss to the Washington Redskins. He finished his rookie season with two tackles, one of which was for loss, in three games played.

Johnson was waived by the Jaguars on June 3, 2019, but was re-signed on July 23, 2019. Johnson was again waived by the Jaguars during final roster cuts on August 31, 2019.

=== Tennessee Titans ===
On September 24, 2019, Johnson was signed to the Tennessee Titans practice squad, but was released one week later on October 1.

=== Indianapolis Colts ===
On October 24, 2019, Johnson was signed to the Indianapolis Colts practice squad, but was released two days later.

=== Arizona Cardinals ===
Johnson was signed to the Arizona Cardinals practice squad on December 4, 2019. He signed a reserve/future contract with the Cardinals on December 30, 2019. On April 30, 2020, Johnson was released by the Cardinals.

== Personal life ==
Johnson is named after his father, Lyndon Baines Johnson Sr., who in turn was named after Lyndon Baines Johnson, who was the sitting U.S. president when he was born.
