= West Point High School (Mississippi) =

Public school in Mississippi, United States

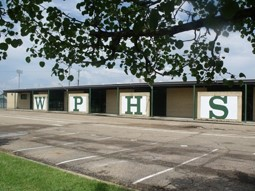
- Bus lane at the South Campus

Location
- 950 S Eshman Ave. West Point, Mississippi 39773; United States; 33.5928643°N 88.6312560°W

Information
- Type: Public
- Motto: It’s a Great Day to be Green & Win With the Wave
- Established: 1929
- School district: West Point Consolidated School District
- Teaching staff: 72.17 (FTE)
- Grades: 8 – 12
- Enrollment: 1,038 (2023–2024)
- Student to teacher ratio: 14.38
- Colors: Green & white
- Mascot: Green Wave
- Rival: Starkville
- Website: www.westpoint.k12.ms.us

West Point High School (WPHS) is in Clay County, Mississippi. It is part of the West Point Consolidated School District. The high school is split in two campuses, one on each side of McAllister Field. Its North Campus serves grades 8 and 9, while the South Campus hosts grades 10 through 12. The West Point Career and Technology Center is located next to the South Campus. A little more than 80 percent of students are African American while about 17 percent are white. At WPHS, students participate in the free lunch program. Green Wave is the school mascot. West Point is a member of the Mississippi High School Activities Association (MHSAA). In May 2021 the school had four valedictorians. West Point High School received a “B” Accountability Rating for the 2022-23 school year.

== Athletics ==
West Point High School hosts 18 sports. Those sports are football, baseball, boys' and girls' basketball, boys’ and girls’ soccer, softball, tennis, volleyball, swimming, archery, powerlifting, esports, boys' and girls' track, golf, band, and cheer.

West Point's varsity football program has won 13 state championships. It has been to nine consecutive Mississippi state championship games as of 2024, winning four in a row from 2016 to 2019, and two more in 2023 and 2024 West Point competes in the North half of MHSAA division 5A. WPHS football and soccer home games are played in Hamblin Stadium at McAllister Field.

West Point's baseball team has two state championship victories, in 1975 and 1988. Home baseball games are played at Taylor Park.

== History ==
West Point was served by Lynch High School in the early 20th century. The school burned in 1928 and was replaced by West Point High School in 1929. In 1953, the high school was moved to its current location. The old high school became Central School and served 5th and 6th graders until its closing in 2018. West Point High School merged with West Point Colored High School when the district integrated. During the 1990’s, plans were made to build a new high school building and gym. The full project was completed in 1995. That building now serves as the North Campus, with the original building being the South Campus. In 2015, West Point School District consolidated with Clay County School District. With the closing of West Clay High School, about 20 years prior, West Point High School served as the secondary school for both districts.

== Notable alumni ==
- Johnny Green (Class of 1955), football player
- Carey Henley (Class of 1955), football player
- George W. Bryan (Class of 1962), former CEO of Sara Lee Foods
- Dolph Pulliam (Class of 1965), basketball player and sportscaster
- Jesse Anderson (Class of 1984), football player
- Orlando Bobo (Class of 1992), American football guard
- Tyrone Bell (Class of 1993), football player
- Dewayne Jefferson (Class of 1997), basketball player
- Justin Cox (Class of 2011), football player
- Vontarrius Dora (Class of 2011), former linebacker
- Lyndon Johnson (Class of 2013), football player
- Jason Brownlee (Class of 2018), football player
