= Carey Henley =

American football player and coach (1936–2013)

No. 26
- Positions: Halfback, Return specialist

Personal information
- Born: September 8, 1936; West Point, Mississippi, U.S.
- Died: April 15, 2013 (aged 76); East Ridge, Tennessee, U.S.
- Listed height: 5 ft 10 in (1.78 m)
- Listed weight: 201 lb (91 kg)

Career information
- High school: West Point (West Point, MS)
- College: Chattanooga
- NFL draft: 1962: 21st round, 164th overall pick

Career history
- Buffalo Bills (1962)

Awards and highlights
- Second-team Little All-American (1961)

Career NFL statistics
- Rushing yards: 2
- Kickoff return yards: 90
- Stats at Pro Football Reference

Carey Ernest Henley (September 24, 1936 – April 15, 2013) was an American professional football player and coach.

Henley was born on September 24, 1936, in West Point, Mississippi, where he graduated from West Point High School in 1955. He served two years in the United States Marine Corps, where he played football for Camp LeJeune. He attended the University of Tennessee at Chattanooga, where he was captain of the 1961 Chattanooga Moccasins football team. In 1962, he played in one game in the American Football League (AFL) for the Buffalo Bills on September 30 against the Dallas Texans. Henley died on April 15, 2013.

Henley earned a master's degree from Middle Tennessee State University. He worked for the public schools of Chattanooga, Tennessee for 30 years, coaching and teaching at Kirkman Technical High School, Brainerd High School and Tyner High School.
