= Mossy Oak =

American camouflage and outdoor lifestyle company

- Type: Private
- Industry: Retail
- Founded: 1986
- Founder: Toxey Haas
- Headquarters: West Point, Mississippi, United States
- Key people: Toxey Haas (CEO); Bill Sugg (President and CFO)
- Parent: Haas Outdoors
- Website: www.mossyoak.com

Mossy Oak is a brand of outdoor clothing and equipment overseen by Haas Outdoors, Inc. founded by Toxey Haas in 1986 in West Point, Mississippi.

== History ==
Haas, an avid outdoorsman, gained inspiration from the natural twigs, leaves, and dirt in the woods. He named it Mossy Oak, gathered up a handful and decided to find someone who could print a fabric resembling this. Crystal Springs Print Works in Georgia printed his first pattern, making an exception to their usual 10,000 yard fabric minimum, as Haas only had enough money for 800 yards.

In 2000, the apparel operations for Haas Outdoors, Inc. were acquired by Russell Brands for an undisclosed amount. This became known as the Mossy Oak Apparel Company, which produces clothing under license from Haas Outdoors.

=== Nativ Nurseries ===
Founded in 2007, Mossy Oak Nativ Nurseries is headquartered in West Point and grows and sells trees for landowners.

=== Gamekeeper Kennels ===
Mossy Oak Gamekeeper Kennels breeds and trains Labrador Retrievers in West Point, Mississippi. Bill Gibson is the Director of Gun Dog Operations.

=== Mossy Oak Properties ===
Mossy Oak Properties is a real estate agency founded in 1999.
