= Jesse Dukeminier =

American lawyer (1925–2003)

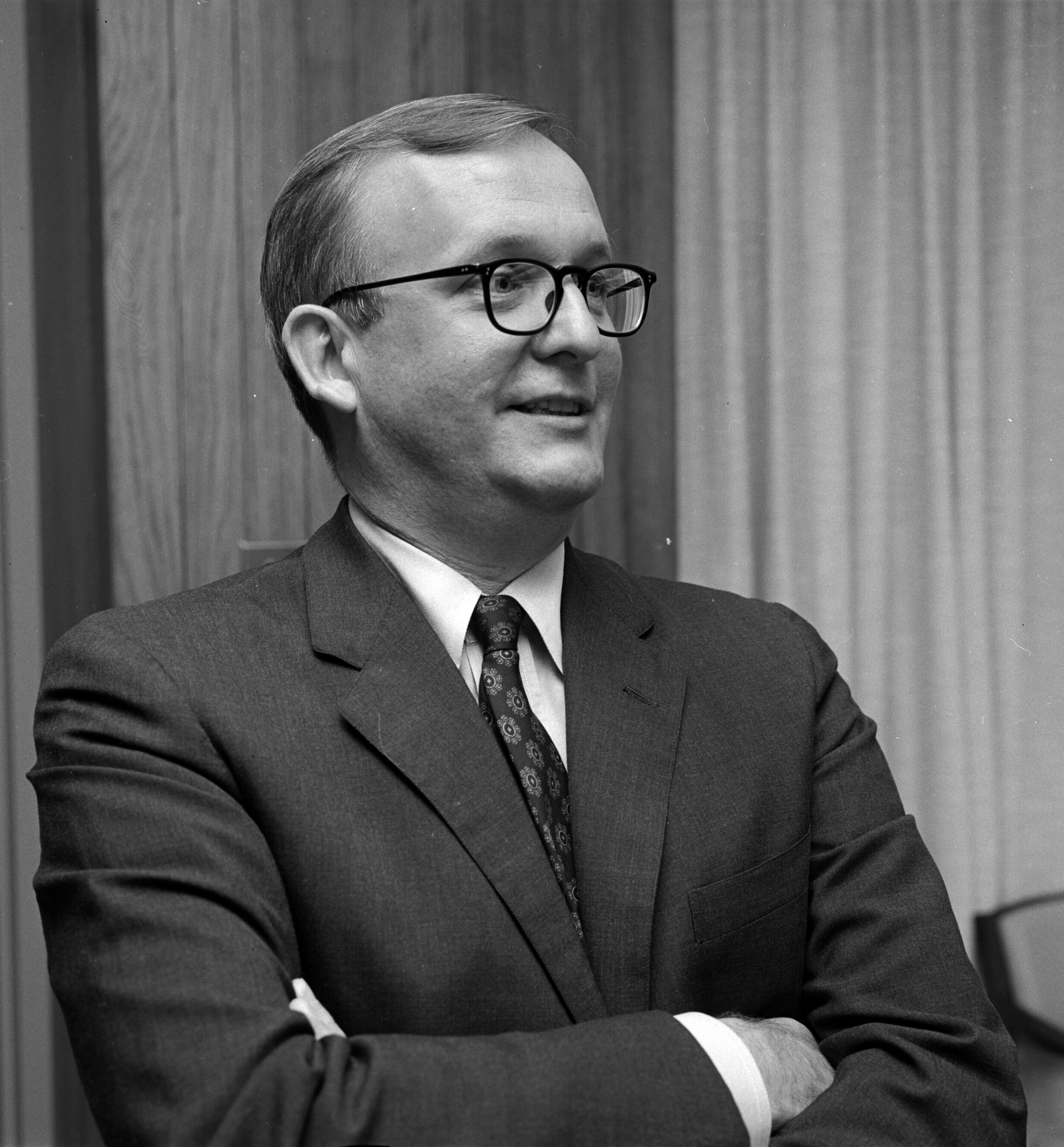
Dukeminier in 1968

Jesse Dukeminier (August 12, 1925 – April 20, 2003) was an American legal scholar. He was a professor of law for 40 years at the University of California, Los Angeles, and authored or co-authored a significant number of articles and textbooks in the areas of property law, wills, trusts, and estates. Dukeminier's Trusts and Estates textbook has been described as "widely used and nationally recognized".

Dukeminier was born in West Point, Mississippi in 1925 and received a bachelor's degree from Harvard University in 1948, and his Juris Doctor from Yale in 1951 before briefly entering the practice of law with a Wall Street law firm. He then taught law at the University of Kentucky College of Law and the University of Minnesota Law School, and visited at Harvard and the University of Chicago before taking a position at UCLA in 1963.
