= Justin Cox =

American gridiron football player (born 1992)

No. 9
- Position: Defensive back

Personal information
- Born: December 9, 1992 (age 33)
- Listed height: 6 ft 0 in (1.83 m)
- Listed weight: 187 lb (85 kg)

Career information
- High school: West Point (MS)
- College: Mississippi State
- NFL draft: 2015: undrafted

Career history
- Kansas City Chiefs (2015)*; Saskatchewan Roughriders (2016)
- * Offseason or practice squad member only

Justin Cox (born December 9, 1992) is an American former football safety. He attended West Point High School in Mississippi. He played collegiate football for two seasons at East Mississippi Community College before enrolling at Mississippi State for two more years.

== College career ==
Cox was a reserve cornerback in 2013 season with Mississippi, in which he recorded 31 tackles and an interception in the Bulldog's overtime Egg Bowl victory over Ole Miss. Cox was the starting safety for the Bulldogs in 2014. He did not play in the final three games after being arrested for burglary and domestic violence. The charge was dropped when Cox pleaded guilty to the misdemeanor charge of trespassing with the domestic violence charge being dropped at victim's request.

== Professional career ==
=== Kansas City Chiefs ===
Cox went unselected in the 2015 NFL draft, but signed a free agent contract with the Kansas City Chiefs soon after.

=== Saskatchewan Roughriders ===
About 10 months after his release by the Chiefs, Cox signed with the Saskatchewan Roughriders of the Canadian Football League (CFL) in May 2016. In his first year in the CFL, Cox played in 15 games contributing 42 tackles, 2 special teams tackles, 4 interceptions and 1 forced fumble. He missed the final 3 games of the season with an undisclosed injury. For his contributions, he was named the team's Rookie of the Year. Following the season, on December 8, 2016, Cox and the Roughriders agreed to a 2-year contract extension, keeping him with the Riders through 2018.

In the off-season, on April 19, 2017, news broke that Cox had been involved in an incident involving domestic violence. In response, the Riders announced that they had released Cox, and CFL commissioner Jeffrey Orridge stated that the league would not allow any other CFL team to sign him. On May 29, 2017, the provincial court of Saskatchewan determined that Cox was found not guilty of assault causing bodily harm. Despite this, the CFL has stated that it will not allow Cox to play in the league, and the Riders stated that they would not welcome him back even if he was allowed to play by the CFL administration.
