= West Point, Mississippi =

- City
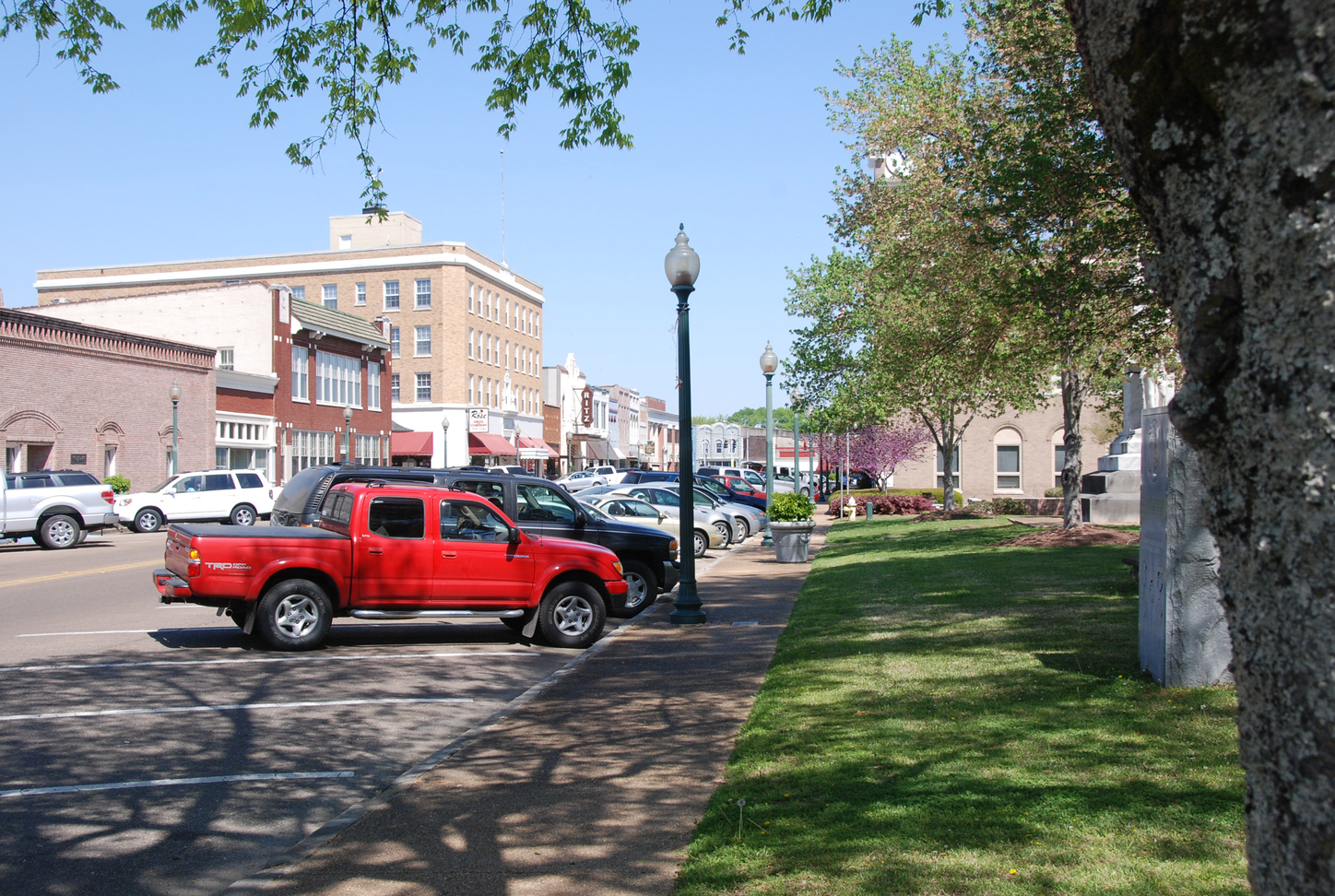
- Downtown West Point from Broad Street

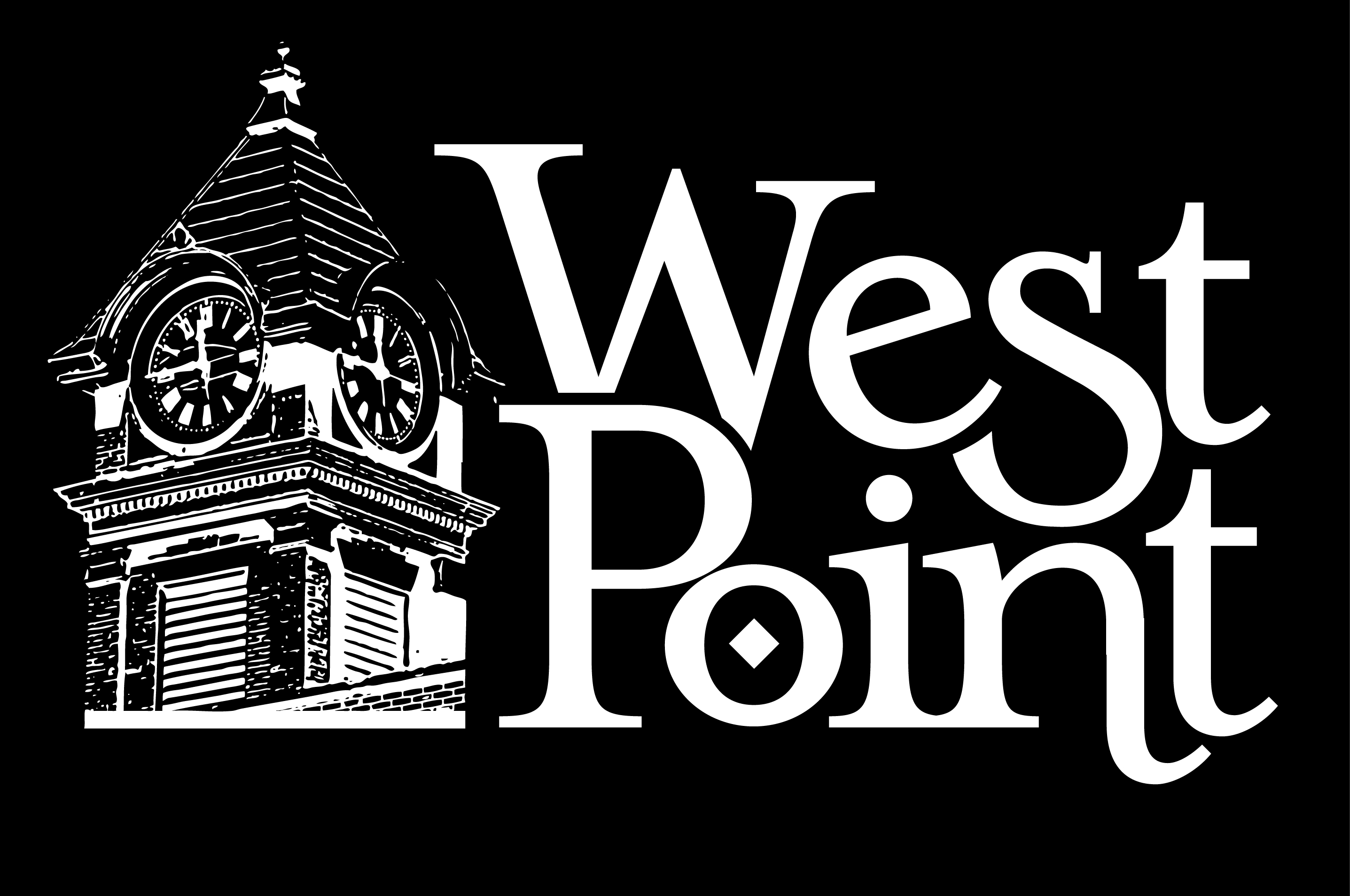
- Flag Seal
- Nickname: Point City
- Location of West Point, Mississippi

- Location in the United States
- Coordinates: 33°36′22″N 88°39′9″W
- Country: United States
- State: Mississippi
- County: Clay

Government
  - Mayor: Rod Bobo (D)

Area
  - Total: 21.13 sq mi (54.73 km^{2})
  - Land: 20.88 sq mi (54.09 km^{2})
  - Water: 0.25 sq mi (0.64 km^{2})
- Elevation: 223 ft (68 m)

Population (2020)
  - Total: 10,105
  - Density: 483.9/sq mi (186.82/km^{2})
- Time zone: UTC−6 (Central (CST))
  - Summer (DST): UTC−5 (CDT)
- ZIP code: 39773
- Area code: 662
- FIPS code: 28-79120
- GNIS feature ID: 0679519
- Website: www.wpnet.org

West Point is a city in Clay County, Mississippi, United States, in the Golden Triangle region of the state. The population was 10,105 at the 2020 census. It is the county seat of Clay County and the principal city of the West Point Micropolitan Statistical Area, which is part of the larger Columbus-West Point Combined Statistical Area.

== History ==
A post office at West Point was built on September 22nd, 1846.

The city was incorporated on November 20th, 1858, around the same time that the Mobile and Ohio Railroad built a line through the city.

== Geography ==
According to the United States Census Bureau, the city has a total area of 21.1 square miles (55 km^{2}), of which 20.8 square miles (54 km^{2}) is land and 0.3 square miles (0.78 km^{2}) (1.28%) is water.

== Demographics ==
Historical population
Census	Pop.	Note	%±
1870	1,392		—
1880	1,786		28.3%
1890	2,762		54.6%
1900	3,193		15.6%
1910	4,864		52.3%
1920	4,400		−9.5%
1930	4,677		6.3%
1940	5,627		20.3%
1950	6,432		14.3%
1960	8,550		32.9%
1970	8,714		1.9%
1980	8,811		1.1%
1990	8,489		−3.7%
2000	12,145		43.1%
2010	11,307		−6.9%
2020	10,105		−10.6%
U.S. Decennial Census

West Point is located in the northeast section of Mississippi just across the Alabama state line. The city has a rich heritage, with generations of family lineage calling it home. Historically the area has a blend of African American, White and Native American lineage. The city has many social activities sponsored by church and civic organizations.

=== 2020 census ===
As of the 2020 census, West Point had a population of 10,105. There were 4,202 households and 2,523 families residing in the city.

The median age was 40.1 years. 23.5% of residents were under the age of 18 and 20.2% were 65 years of age or older. For every 100 females, there were 83.1 males, and for every 100 females age 18 and over, there were 78.6 males age 18 and over.

80.5% of residents lived in urban areas, while 19.5% lived in rural areas.

Of all households, 31.1% had children under the age of 18 living in them. Of all households, 31.7% were married-couple households, 18.4% were households with a male householder and no spouse or partner present, and 45.7% were households with a female householder and no spouse or partner present. About 32.5% of all households were made up of individuals, and 15.2% had someone living alone who was 65 years of age or older.

There were 4,825 housing units, of which 12.9% were vacant. The homeowner vacancy rate was 2.6%, and the rental vacancy rate was 13.8%.

Racial composition as of the 2020 census
Race	Number	Percent
White	3,476	34.4%
Black or African American	6,285	62.2%
American Indian and Alaska Native	28	0.3%
Asian	41	0.4%
Native Hawaiian and Other Pacific Islander	1	0.0%
Some other race	66	0.7%
Two or more races	208	2.1%
Hispanic or Latino (of any race)	90	0.9%

=== 2010 census ===
As of the census of 2010, there were 11,307 people 4,444 households, and 3,043 families residing in the city. The population density was 535.13 inhabitants per square mile (206.61/km^{2}). There were 4,856 housing units at an average density of 235.3 per square mile (90.8/km^{2}). The racial makeup of the city was 37.57% White, 61.40% African American, 0.01% Native American, 0.18% Asian, 0.1% from other races, and 0.2% from two or more races. Hispanic or Latino people of any race was 0.88% of the population.

There were 3,043 households, out of which 22.2% had own children under the age of 18 living with them, 35.1% were married couples living together, 28.4% had a female householder with no husband present, male household no wife present 4.9% and 31.5% were non-families. 28.6% of all households were made up of individuals, and 28.7% had someone living alone who was 65 years of age or older. The average household size was 2.48, and the average family size was 3.04.

In the city, the population was spread out, with 22.6% under the age of 18, 6.4% from 20 to 24, 23.7% from 25 to 44, 25.1% from 45 to 64, and 15.1% who were 65 years of age or older. The median age was 36.4 years. The population was 53.7% female and 46.3% male.

The median income for a household in the city was $30,440, and the median income for a family was $39,295. The per capita income for the city was $17,675. About 23.4% of families and 24.6% of the population were below the poverty line, including 37.8% of those under age 18 and 13.6% of those people age 65 or over.

== Economy ==
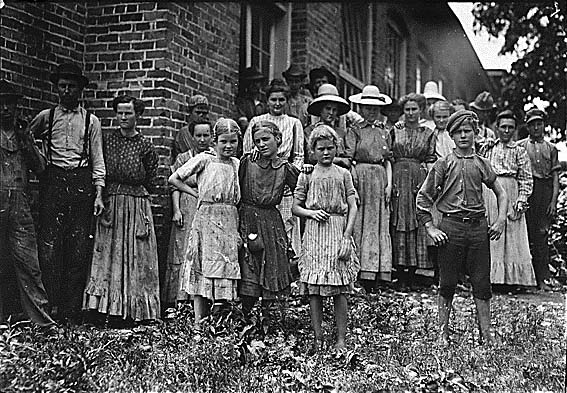
Child labor in West Point Cotton Mills, May 1911. Photo by Lewis Hine.

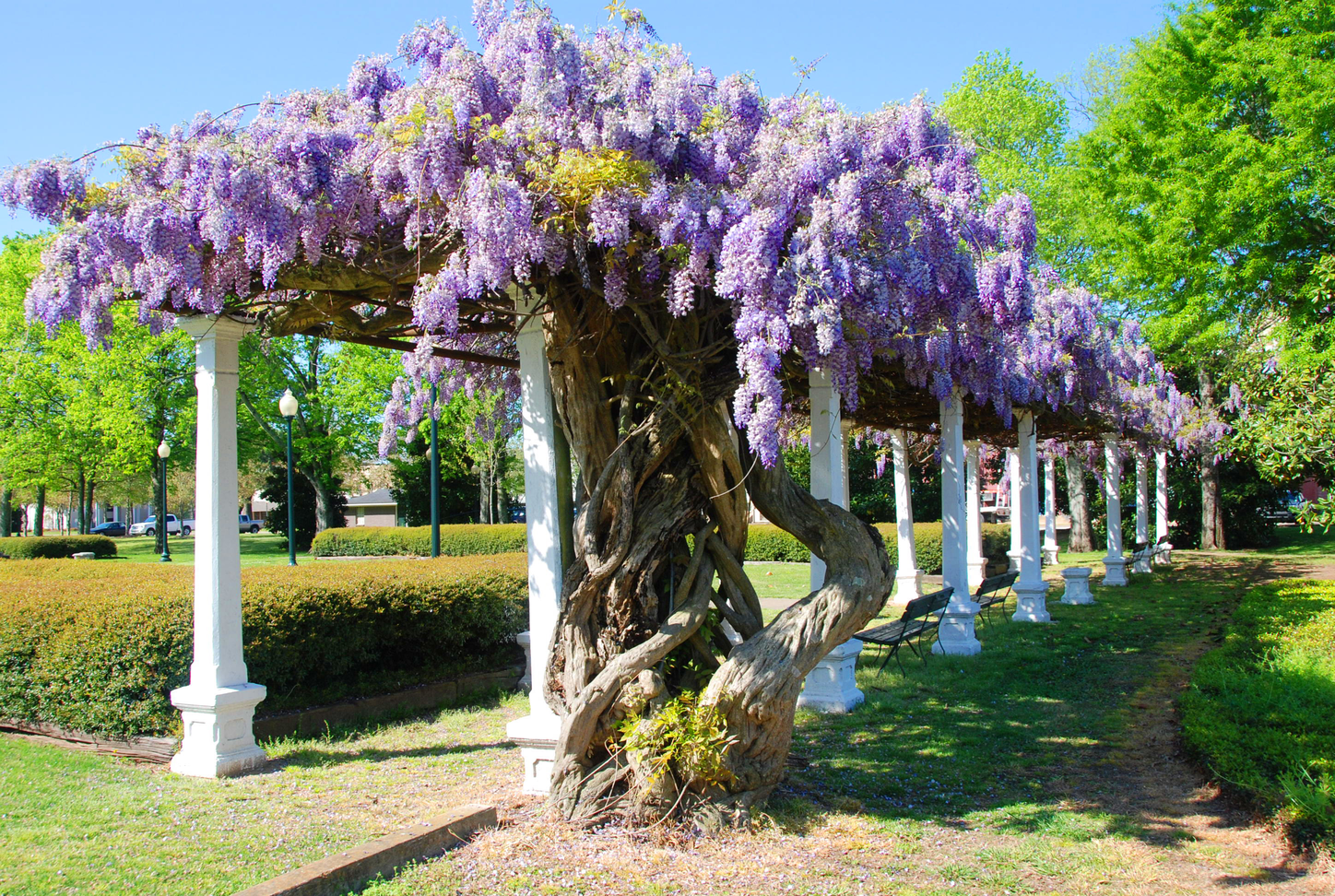
Sallie Kate Winters Park in full bloom

Large businesses in West Point include Southern Ionics, Babcock & Wilcox, and Mossy Oak. Bryan Foods was founded in West Point in 1936 by John H. Bryan, Sr and W.B. Bryan. Bryan Foods was acquired by Sara Lee Corporation in 1968 and continued operations in West Point until March 2007.

== Arts and culture ==
Old Waverly Golf Club, located outside of West Point and recognized as one of Mississippi's top golf courses, hosted the 1999 U.S. Women's Open, which was won by Juli Inkster. West Point Country Club is three minutes from downtown West Point and offers 18 holes of golf, swimming, tennis and a club house.

Payne Field was an advanced aviation school operated from May 1918 to March 1920. About 1,500 pilots were trained there. It is recognized as the first airfield in the state of Mississippi.

Despite averaging less than 1" of snow a year, West Point was the home of the original Blazon-Flexible Flyer, Inc. proclaimed to make the best snow sled in the United States, which became an American tradition.

Waverly Plantation Mansion, eight miles east of West Point, is a National Historic Landmark. Its four-story cantilevered stair hall and cupola are considered unique in the United States. The mansion is open daily for tours from 9 am to 5 pm. An admission fee is charged.

West Point is the home of the Howlin' Wolf Blues Museum. Each Labor Day weekend the town of West Point hosts the Prairie Arts Festival. The weekend kicks off with the Howlin’ Wolf Blues Festival on Friday night followed by the Prairie Arts Festival during the day on Saturday. The festival showcases the areas arts and crafts with shopping, music, rides for children, a 5K race and a car show.

== Education ==
Public education in the city of West Point is provided by the West Point Consolidated School District.

The West Point Green Wave football team has won the state championship for their classification thirteen times, in 1982, 1987, 1988, 1989, 2005, 2009, 2010, 2016, 2017, 2018,2019, 2023, and 2024.

West Point is the home of three high schools. West Point High School, the town's lone public high school, offers a diverse classroom environment and is the largest of the three. Oak Hill Academy and Hebron Christian School are tuition based private schools.

Oak Hill Academy is a private PK-12 school that was founded in 1966 as a segregation academy for white students.

== Notable people ==
- Jesse Anderson, professional football player
- Tyrone Bell, professional football player
- Orlando Bobo, professional football player
- Wirt Bowman, capitalist, entrepreneur, and one of the founders of the Agua Caliente Casino and Hotel
- George W. Bryan, local businessman
- John H. Bryan, Former CEO of Sara Lee Corporation
- Silas Chandler (1838-1919), co-founder of Mount Hermon Baptist Church
- Cleveland Crosby, professional football player
- John Davidson, former member of the Illinois Senate
- Vontarrius Dora, football outside linebacker
- Kevin Dotson, football offensive guard
- Jesse Dukeminier (1925–2003), professor of law
- David Gibbs, legislator, businessman
- Karl Gibbs, member of the Mississippi House of Representatives
- Tom Goode, professional football player
- Johnny Green, football player
- Toxey Haas, founder and CEO of Haas Outdoors, Inc.
- Floyd Heard, retired track and field sprinter
- Carey Henley, football player
- Paul V. Hester, Commander, Pacific Air Forces; Air Component Commander for the Commander, U.S. Pacific Command, Hickam Air Force Base, Hawaii, 2004–2007
- Don Hopkins, pinch runner for the Oakland Athletics
- Dewayne Jefferson, former professional basketball player
- Lyndon Johnson, football defensive end
- Reuben D. Jones, retired United States Army major general
- Bubba Phillips, baseball player
- Lenore L. Prather, Chief Justice of the Mississippi Supreme Court
- Dolph Pulliam, former basketball player
- Earl T. Ricks, U.S. Air Force major general, Chief of the National Guard Bureau and mayor of Hot Springs, Arkansas
- Larry Semon, actor, director, producer, and screenwriter during the silent film era
- Brad Smith (born 1968), guitarist for the band Blind Melon
- Rogers Stevens (born 1970), guitarist for the band Blind Melon
- Barrett Strong, Motown singer who had Motown's first hit with "Money"
- William Townsend (1914–2005), Arkansas state legislator and optometrist
- Bennie Turner, legislator, lawyer
- Angela Turner-Ford, member of the Mississippi House of Representatives
- Michael Williams, film director, producer, screenwriter, cinematographer and Film editor
- Howlin' Wolf (real name Chester Arthur Burnett), blues musician, born in West Point
- Zora Young, blues singer
