= Oak Hill Academy (Mississippi) =

Segregation academy in Mississippis

Location
- West Point, Mississippi; United States; 33.6167°N 88.6339°W

Information
- Opened: 1966
- NCES School ID: 00735523
- Principal: Phill Ferguson
- Faculty: 30
- Enrollment: 380
- Athletics conference: MAIS
- Teams: Raiders
- Accreditation: Mississippi Association of Independent Schools; Southern Association of Colleges and Schools
- Website: www.oakhillacademy.net
- Last updated: 8 January 2018

Oak Hill Academy is a private PK-12 school in West Point, Mississippi, the seat of Clay County, Mississippi. The school serves about 400 students. It was founded as a segregation academy in 1966.

== History ==
Oak Hill was refused tax-exempt status by the IRS in the 1970s for refusal to execute a policy of non-discrimination.

The school's policy was a matter of questioning at the Senate confirmation of Lyonel Thomas Senter Jr. as a federal judge. His children attended Oak Hill.

In 1987, Oak Hill was still an all-white school, as described in Fyfe v. Curlee. In 2016, the school had no black students registered. By 2021, the National Center for Education Statistics reported the school had 279 students, of whom two were Black and four Hispanic. The racial makeup of Clay County is 56.33% Black or African American, 42.82% White, 0.05% Native American, 0.16% Asian, 0.01% Pacific Islander, 0.21% from other races, and 0.42% from two or more races. 0.86% of the population were Hispanic or Latino of any race.
