= Crain Communications Building =

Skyscraper in Chicago, Illinois

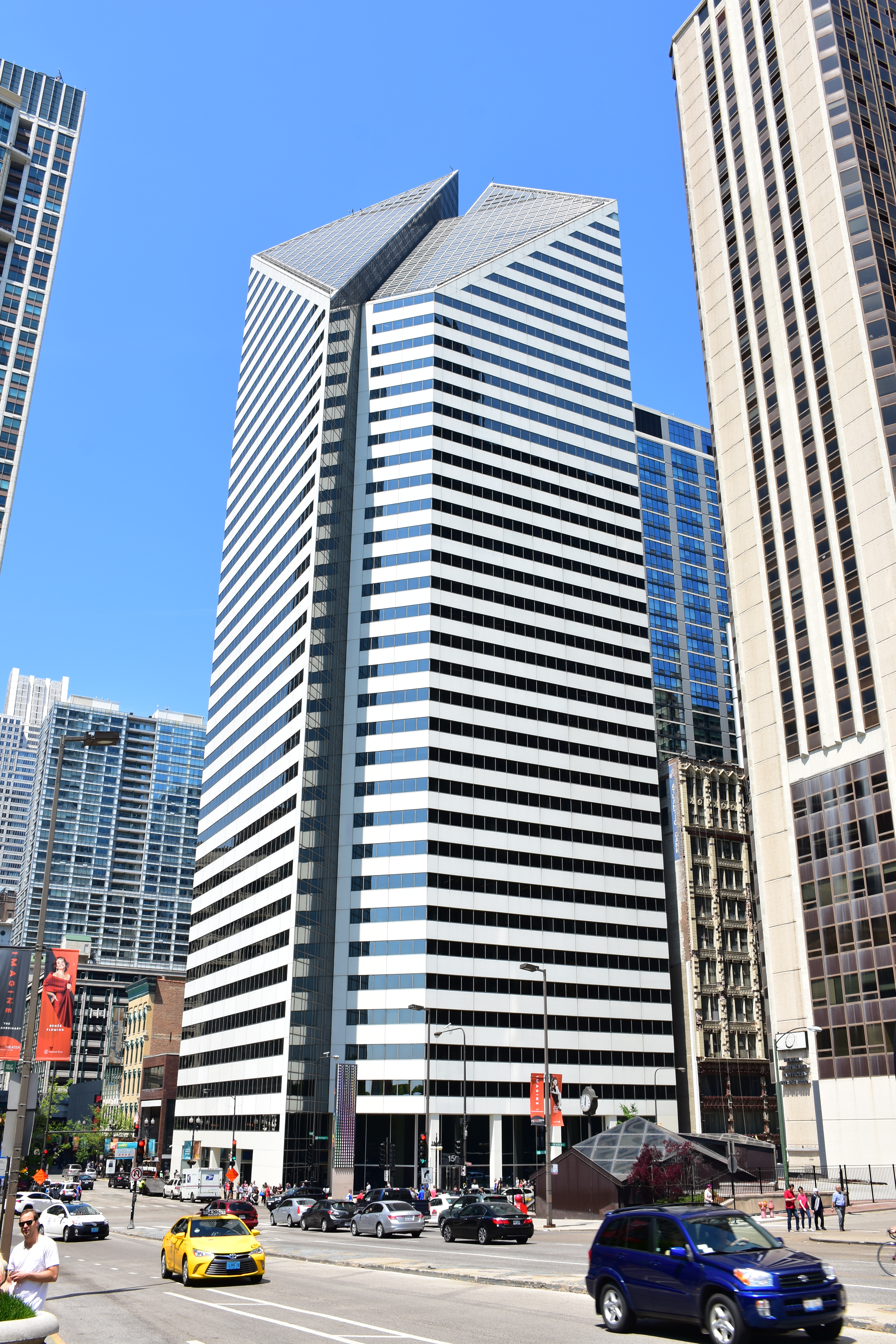
- Crain Communications Building in 2016
- Interactive map of the Crain Communications Building area

General information
- Location: 150 N. Michigan Av. Chicago, Illinois, United States
- Coordinates: 41.8854°N 87.6248°W
- Construction started: 1982
- Completed: 1983
- Opening: 1984
- Owner: John Hancock Real Estate Asset Management

Height
- Tip: 582 ft (177 m)

Technical details
- Floor count: 39
- Floor area: 709,998 ft^{2} (65,961.0 m^{2})

Design and construction
- Architects: A. Epstein and Sons

The Crain Communications Building is a 39-story, 582 foot (177 m) skyscraper located at 150 North Michigan Avenue in downtown Chicago, Illinois. Also (previously) known as the Smurfit–Stone Building and the Stone Container Building, it was originally going to be named "One Park Place" before it opened as the Associates Center, named after the initial tenant of the building, the Associates Commercial Corp.

Construction of the building began in 1982 and was completed in 1984. The building, noted for its uncommon slanted top facade, was designed by Sheldon Schlegman of A. Epstein and Sons. It has 39 floors of tenant space and the two spires at the top cover the main roof and serve as mechanical rooms for HVAC equipment.

== History ==
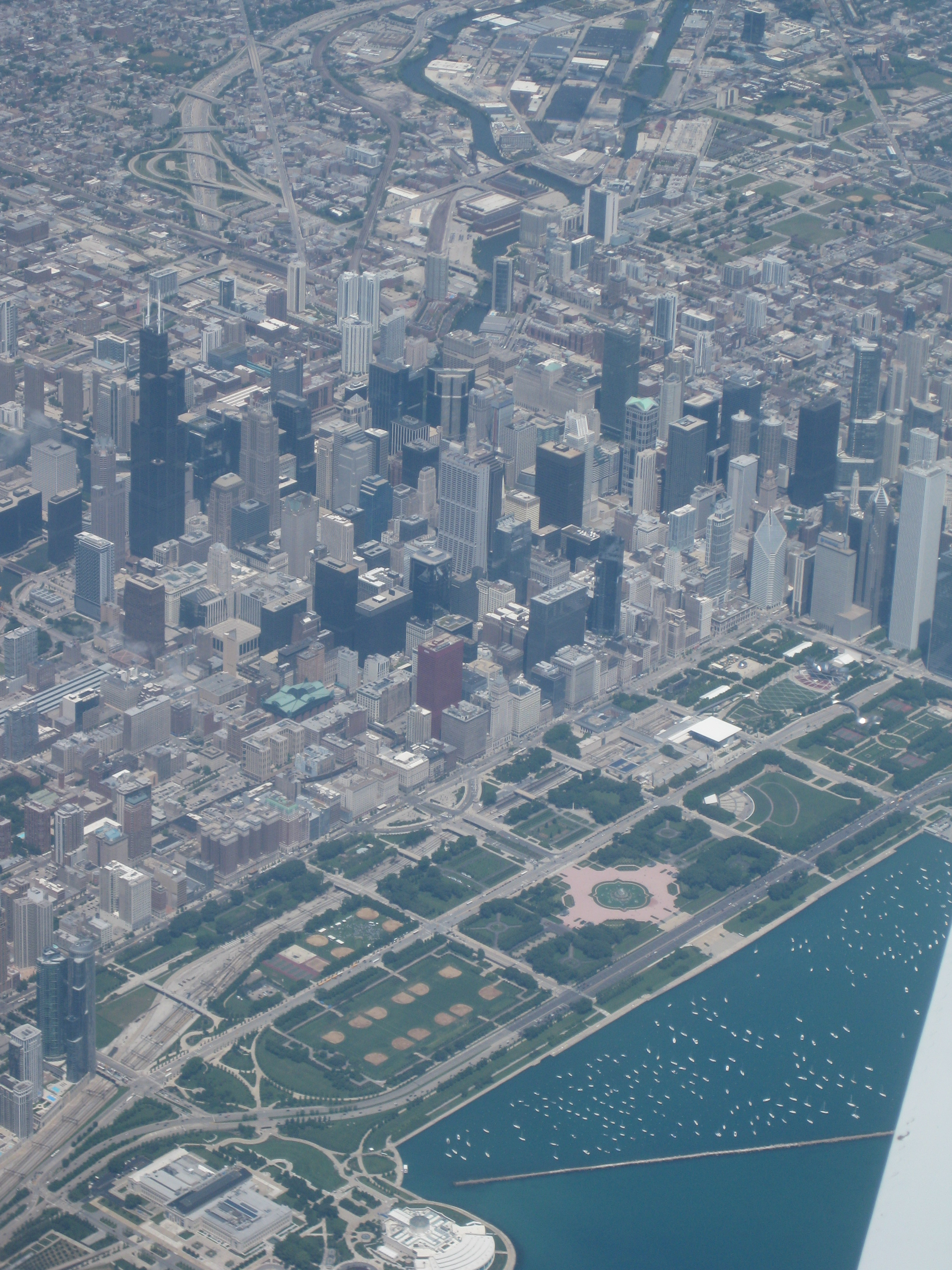
Crain Communications Building at the northwest corner of Grant Park

Although the building looks as though it is split down the middle, the two sides are only slightly disjointed all the way to the top, where there is a gap between them. At times, its flat but slanted and "cut" roof—which has been likened to a skyscraper pared with a knife—displays local sports slogans on its face, such as "GO BEARS" and "GO SOX". It also displayed "VOTE 2008" during the 2008 election day rally at Grant Park.

At the time of its construction, the Associates Center was considered to be a smart building, with sophisticated environmental and security controls. Three years after its completion, the building played a role in the Touchstone Pictures film Adventures in Babysitting. It was also the location of Patrovita's office in the 1986 film Raw Deal. The building is also modeled in EA's SimCity 4, as well as being destroyed in the film Transformers: Dark of the Moon and in the videogame Command & Conquer: Red Alert 2. The building name was changed to the Crain Communications Building in March 2012, after Crain Communications moved its headquarters there.

It is popularly referred to as the Diamond Building or the Vagina Building (from the locally popular but apocryphal story that, with its prominent vertical slit up the front, the building was designed to be a yonic counter to the phallic nature of most skyscrapers).

== Tenants ==
- Crain Communications
- Consulate General of Sweden Chicago
- German American Chamber of Commerce of the Midwest
- Wells Fargo: Insurance Services
- United Airlines: previously maintained a ticketing office in this building.

== See also ==
- List of tallest buildings in Chicago
