= Tyrone Bell =

American football player (born 1974)

No. 47
- Position: Defensive back

Personal information
- Born: October 20, 1974 (age 52); West Point, Mississippi, U.S.
- Listed height: 6 ft 2 in (1.88 m)
- Listed weight: 205 lb (93 kg)

Career information
- High school: West Point
- College: North Alabama
- NFL draft: 1999: 6th round, 178th overall pick

Career history
- San Diego Chargers (1999)*; Green Bay Packers (1999); Seattle Seahawks (2000)*; Memphis Maniax (2001); British Columbia Lions (2001–2002); Winnipeg Blue Bombers (2002)
- * Offseason or practice squad member only

Career NFL statistics
- Games played: 1
- Tackles: 1
- Stats at Pro Football Reference

Tyrone Bell (born October 20, 1974) is an American former professional defensive back in the National Football League (NFL) and Canadian Football League (CFL).

== Early life ==
Bell was born Tyrone Edward Bell in West Point, Mississippi.

== Professional career ==
Bell was selected in the sixth round of the 1999 NFL draft by the San Diego Chargers with the 178th overall pick. He would spend that season with the Green Bay Packers. He played at the collegiate level at the University of North Alabama. He also played for the BC Lions and Memphis Maniax.

== Personal life ==
Bell is currently a Senior Vice President of Primerica Financial Services in Huntsville, Alabama.
