= Bryan Foods =

American company

Bryan Foods is an American meat company founded in 1936 by John H. Bryan Sr. and W.B. Bryan in West Point, Mississippi.

== Information ==
The company was acquired in 1968 by Sara Lee Corporation, which later became Hillshire Brands, and was subsequently acquired by Tyson Foods. Its headquarters were originally in West Point, then relocated to Cincinnati, Ohio, before moving to Downers Grove, Illinois. Bryan Foods products are primarily sold in the Southern United States.

== Products ==
The products that Bryan Foods sells to consumers include the following:

- Hotdogs
- Smoked sausage
- Lunch meat
- Cocktail smokies
- Ham
- Corn dogs
- Bacon
- Breakfast sausage
