= Freddie Lee Peterkin =

American singer-songwriter

Freddie Lee Peterkin, also known as Freddie Lee, is a published author, singer–songwriter, actor and ordained interdenominational Minister, born in Pahokee, Florida. He is known for his gritty power soul vocals reminiscent of Bobby Womack. He has become an artist of public note through his 2008 independent release of the Soul and Gospel album Beyond Comprehension under the recording name of Freddie Lee. He made his prime time acting debut as "DJ Freddie Murphy" on Channel 4's T4 Stars & Strikes and as a character in BBC2's Grumpy Guide to Work in 2011. He was also the voice for Bewiser Owl in the Bewiser Insurance TV commercial in 2012 and 2013. He established himself in the live entertainment industry with his choreographed costume Soul Tribute stage productions for theatres and resorts in 1991. These critically acclaimed shows include The Sounds of the Four Tops, The Sounds of the Drifters and The Sounds of the Temptations. He is currently a DJ and presenter on Solar Radio.

Freddie Lee Peterkin is also a member of Alpha Phi Alpha fraternity, Delta Psi chapter. Peterkin was responsible for composing many Delta Psi Chapter fraternity anthems such as 'I Know I've Been Changed' written in 1985 while he was pledging. He was also a dancer and choreographer of the Delta Psi Chapter's 'Step Shows'. Stepping (African-American) or step-dancing is a form of percussive dance in which the participant's entire body is used as an instrument to produce complex rhythms and sounds through a mixture of footsteps, spoken word, and hand claps and a strong part of Black Greek Letter Fraternities.

Peterkin is the son of migrant workers originally from Georgia who came to Florida to pick crops for a living. He is of African and Seminole Indian heritage. His stepfather, James Elijah Jr., was the lead vocalist of the 1960s and 1970s gospel group, The Royal Lights. His sister Breyona Elijah is part of the gospel group James Smith & Nu Birth and they are both cousins of Gospel group Damali. His mother Bernice Bell is also a singer and as a child won a competition to write a song for Joe Tex, for which she was awarded concert tickets and a chance to meet her idol. Joe Tex went on to have a major hit with the song but Bernice remained uncredited. Bernice Bell has been more recently recognized for her charity work and ran youth programs in Pahokee's Padgett Island Community Center for 17 years and donating hot meals to Pahokee's underprivileged children. The community center was recently renamed "The Bernice Bell Community Center".

== Early life ==
Peterkin grew up in Padgett Island one of a number of housing projects in Pahokee, Florida, US. As a child he began working alongside his family picking beans and oranges to support the family income. Like most children in the area he also attended Pahokee Elementary and Pahokee High School. Whilst in school Freddie became part of the Pahokee marching band OD Express and also part of the New Hope Missionary Baptist Church Choir. He also formed a High School band called High Society featuring James Smith, Ronald 'Buttermilk' Banks and twins Barlow and Peewee Bouie. Freddie was an exceptional high school student and gained a scholarship to attend Florida Memorial University, a historical black college based in Miami, Florida.

He graduated with a double degree in Airway Science, Business Management and minors in Sociology, Psychology and Education. Whilst attending Florida Memorial University, he pledged to his fraternity Alpha Phi Alpha. He also formed the Florida Memorial Gospel Choir with Benjamin Carroll. During this time Freddie was part of the Soul and Gospel group 'Message' and he opened up for artists such as Howard Hewett, Betty Wright, Vanessa Bell Armstrong and Shirley Caesar. He also worked with Gloria Estefan and Miami Sound Machine, providing backing vocals on their studio recordings. From 1985 to 1991, he served as the assistant Pastor at Greater New Hope Missionary Baptist Church, Pahokee, FL. He was certified for ministering by Reverend W. Bouyer and Church Secretary Ms Mary Jackson and served under Rev. Bouyer and his successor Dr. Rev. Bass holding Sunday service every fourth Sunday. From 1987 to 1991 he also studied Expository Preaching and Exegetical Preaching under his mentor Elder Rev. Kenneth Duke at New Jerusalem Primitive Baptist Church, Miami Florida.

Upon graduating, Freddie was a qualified counselor working at the Miami Psychological Evaluation Center and a school teacher for the County. A career change came with a contract to produce a soul show in Spain. He and his colleagues in his singing group Message left the United States for Europe. At this time Peterkin also left his ministerial career in the church.

== Early career ==
After an initial audition in 1989, in which Peterkin and the other members of Message had to perform several choreographed soul tribute performances, Freddie delayed leaving the United States. He left for Spain in 1991 and began a new life as an entertainer and show producer. He created one of the earliest known soul tribute shows in Europe. In 1993, Freddie renamed the group from Message to Aces, and he was responsible for costumes and show production as well as sharing lead vocals in the show. He was based initially in Madrid and then in Gran Canaria, touring all the live music venues. Aces featured on television, billboards and buses. They also toured England, Germany, France, Italy and the rest of Spain.

Aces relocated permanently to London, England in 1998 and were the first American Soul Tribute show to be seen in the UK. They began touring and working 300 shows a year in theatre, clubs, resorts and festivals. They appeared several times on Capital Gold Radio Roadshows. Freddie was responsible for both costume and choreography for the national theatre show Reach Out, produced by Pete Tobit.

== Homeless ==
In 2002, Freddie found that the colleague who had been appointed Aces' business administrator was stealing from their company account for years. Freddie and the other group members were outraged and closed down the group, after which the members went their separate ways. The consequences of the theft combined with the termination of their work contract to cause Peterkin and two colleagues to lose their homes. During this time, out of pride and a refusal to ask others for help, Peterkin slept in his car at roadside service stations whilst restarting both his life and career. Having lost everything, he could not bring himself to return home to the USA, which would mean facing his family. He has stated in interviews that the few friends in which he confided his situation turned their backs on him, although they had previously enjoyed sharing his once-luxurious lifestyle. It was during this time that he found inspiration for much of the album Beyond Comprehension.

== Restarting his career ==
In early 2003, Peterkin was signed up under the management of Jessie Tsang, who gave him some contracts to work as a solo artist. He showcased for The Stage newspaper and won rave reviews for his performance in Showcall 2003. By 2004, Peterkin was back on his feet again and the show named Sounds of The Four Tops made its debut at the national Showcall Showcase 2004. Peterkin gained recognition in the UK live performance industry through producing shows for Soul Tribute Production and was frequently reviewed by The Stage for his productions Sounds of The Four Tops, Sounds of the Drifters, and, later, the 2009 Sounds of the Temptations show. These production show began touring in the United Kingdom and Europe, averaging two hundred dates per year.

== Plagiarism of Peterkin's dramatic works ==
In 2009, Peterkin discovered that the colleague who had stolen from him and the other group members in 2002 had misappropriated his original stage production, selling it as The Magic of Motown Theatre Show. Three former employees falsely claimed in The Herald newspaper that they had choreographed Peterkin's stage production in How Sweet It Is, another British theatre production. These former employees had been between 12 and 14 years old when Peterkin - then between 23 and 27 years of age - first created and performed the works to the public between 1989-1994.

Peterkin has since taken legal action against both the show producer of The Magic of Motown Theatre Show (his former colleague from Aces) and his former employees in How Sweet It Is through Leonard Lowy and Co Solicitors, the former in-house solicitor for Island Records. Both shows gave notice that they would cease and desist from using Peterkin's works but did not do so until 2010. Peterkin stated in interviews that he intends to still take the matter to High Court to be acknowledged for his works and to seek compensation for the illegal use of his works.

Unaffected by the plagiarism, Freddie Lee's productions Sounds of The Four Tops and Sounds of The Drifters continue to be the most heavily booked Soul Tribute Production Shows in the UK. These productions enabled Freddie to independently finance the production and pressing of his first album Beyond Comprehension. The album went into production in early 2007 and was completed by the December of the same year.

== Beyond Comprehension ==
The Beyond Comprehension album was Peterkin's first critically acclaimed solo recording; it established him as a recording artist and songwriter on radio and in the music press. In August 2008, Peterkin flew a copy of Beyond Comprehension to Radio DJ Dawn Brady on WSWN Sugar 900 Radio; this was the album's US debut. Peterkin chose Sugar 900 Radio because he grew up working in the surrounding sugar cane fields and orange groves. Stellar Award winning radio station WMBM Radio became the next station to support the album, with DJs MJ Smith and Jerry 'the Disciple' Sawyer, interviewing Peterkin on four occasions.

Other radio stations such as WHQT, Hot 105FM have since followed suit. Chief Jimmie Brown interviewed Peterkin for the first time alongside Walter Clyde Orange of the Commodores on Hot 105FM in September 2008. The first Radio station in the UK to play the song 'Brighter Days' from the album 'Beyond Comprehension' was Mike Rimmer on BBC Radio WM in August 2008.

The album Beyond Comprehension was produced by music heavyweights Tony Bean and Colin Bassett at 5am Productions for 5am Records, Birmingham, UK. 5am have been noted for their work with UK soul star Lemar, and US stars Kelly Rowland, Usher, Tyrese and Justin Timberlake. The PR behind the album was Michael Grant, formerly a child reggae star in the group Musical Youth, and Jessie Tsang.

Beyond Comprehension was initially distributed independently through CD Baby and iTunes and has gained popularity through British soul clubs and specialist soul music radio stations such as Solar Radio, Starpoint Radio and 209 Radio. Most recently he was interviewed on mainstream FM stations by Tony Roots on New Style Radio 98.7FM and by Joe Aldred on BBC Radio WM 95.6FM.

On 16 June 2009, Peterkin gave his first British television interview on the chat show Bright Talk on BEN Television, Sky TV channel 184. Following radio and club support by the UK's premier soul DJ's on November 23, 2009, the album was made available in independent UK music shops and hit the No.12 spot Solar Radio's album charts on December 14, 2009. Music from his album "Beyond Comprehension" has featured heavily on the Phil Driver Soul Unsigned radio show and the Gary Spence Soulchoonz radio show, giving Peterkin airplay in the UK, US, Spain, Sweden and the Netherlands.

Following this success Peterkin is featured in the January 2010 edition of Blues & Soul, speaking to noted UK R&B writer Pete Lewis. also appears in a 3-page feature in the February edition of Soul Survivors magazine in an interview with journalist and DJ Fitzroy Facey. Towards the end of 2010 Freddie was featured in a small role in the feature film 'How Not To Be a Loser' with Richard E. Grant. He also made a guest appearance in the BBC 2 comedy series 'Grumpy Guide to...' screened in 2011. Freddie also released his first music video for "The Great I Am" from the album "Beyond Comprehension" in January 2011. The video was directed by Gratian Dimech and James Heath of Razor Edge Productions. He is also wrote and produced with 5am Productions, his first artist - Clifton End. In February 2011 Freddie played the role of a comedy character creation on T4 (Channel 4). This was followed by small roles in various feature films from 2011 to 2012.

== Music ==
Three years after the release of his first album, Peterkin released his new single "Searching" on May 1, 2011. This single is the first release from his forthcoming second album, My Soul Intentions, distributed via iTunes, Amazon and Nokia Music. On October 24, 2011 he released the single "Book of Love". As of July 2012, he released the single "Lover is Forever" with a B side "Brighter Days" (remixed).

Over the course of 2013 Peterkin wrote several compositions with David Lee Andrews. One of these compositions originally titled "If We Just Keep Holding On To Love" is performed by David Lee Andrews. The track has since been renamed "Hold On To Love". The method of collaboration was done via Andrews sending instrumental and vocal ideas via e-mail and Peterkin returning verses, choruses and hooks via video and mp3 demos. The final production of "Hold On" was completed by Tony Bean and Colin Basset of 5am Productions who had produced Beyond Comprehension.

Released in June 2014 was the single "So Far Away" performed by Dutch Caribbean star Clifton End, written by Peterkin, Tony Bean and Ronald Banks. Once again the track is produced by Tony Bean and Colin Bassett of 5am Productions. Peterkin had written and recorded the original version song "So Far Away" over 20 years ago but had been looking for the right artist to convey the emotion of the song. "So Far Away" reached No. 2 on the Official UK Soul Chart as of August 2014.

Freddie Lee Peterkin has been under the management of Jessie Tsang since 2003. Jessie Tsang became the CEO of Solar Records and Soul Train Records in 2018 according to Soul Survivors magazine.

After a hiatus from the music scene, Freddie Lee Peterkin is set to return to the music scene with the single 'Freedom' written by Dana Meyers, and the late Kevin Johnson of the group Slave and Peterkin. Dana Meyers is famed for writing smash hits for the Gladys Knight, The Whispers, Shalamar, Glenn Jones and Janet Jackson.

== Return to the church ==
In 2012, Peterkin re-dedicated his life to Christ and returned to the Church ministry as a member of the clergy. In early 2014 he embarked upon a ministerial tour of churches across the state of Florida, preaching his first sermons in eight years and visiting other churches. He became ordained in December 2014.

He is once again known as Minister Freddie Lee Peterkin. His online ministry currently reaches an audience of up to 20,000 people each month offering psychological counsel, and spiritual guidance. He is a certified minister, originally licensed by Reverend W. Bouyer and Church Secretary Ms Mary Jackson in 1985 and ordained in December 2014. Peterkin's style of ministering is described as Expository Preaching and Exegetical Preaching which he had studied in 1997 to 1991, under his mentor Elder Rev. Kenneth Duke at New Jerusalem Primitive Baptist Church, Miami Florida. He is also a certified teacher and psychological counselor licensed by the State of Florida in 1989.

== Film and television credits ==
- 2014: Luck - Feature Film Directed by Liviu Tipuriță (Role: Casino Gambler)
- 2013: 'English Language Educational Series' - For London Wall TV Studios (Role: American Interviewee)
- 2012: World War Z - Feature Film starring Brad Pitt (Role: Looter)
- 2012: Streetdance 2 3-D - Feature Film starring (Role: Fan)
- 2011: How to Stop Being a Loser - Feature Film starring Richard E Grant (Role: Lawyer)
- 2011: Stars and Strikes - Channel 4 Saturday Morning TV Show (Role: Presenter DJ Freddie Murphy)
- 2011: 4Music - Channel 4 Music Show (Role: Presenter DJ Freddie Murphy)
- 2011: 'Bewiser Insurance' - TV Commercial (Role: Voice of Bewiser Owl)
- 2011: 'English Language Educational Series' - For London Wall TV Studios (Role: American Interviewee)
- 2010: The Grumpy Guide To Work - BBC 2 Series (Role: Naughty Office Worker)
- 2010: "On The Inside" - Feature Film starring Phoenix James as Robert King the Black Panther activist (Role: Wallace jail inmate)
