= Merrill Noel =

American football player (born 1991)

Profile
- Position: Cornerback

Personal information
- Born: September 10, 1991 (age 35); Pahokee, Florida, U.S.
- Listed height: 5 ft 10 in (1.78 m)
- Listed weight: 177 lb (80 kg)

Career information
- High school: Pahokee (FL)
- College: Wake Forest
- NFL draft: 2015: undrafted

Career history
- Buffalo Bills (2015)

Awards and highlights
- ACC Defensive Rookie of the Year (2011)

Merrill "Bud" Noel (born September 10, 1991) is an American former football cornerback.

== Early life ==
A native of Pahokee, Florida, Noel attended Pahokee High School, where he was a teammate of Janoris Jenkins and Richard Ash.

Noel was named ACC Defensive Rookie of the Year in 2011.

== Professional career ==
=== Buffalo Bills ===
Following the 2015 NFL draft, Noel signed with the Buffalo Bills as an undrafted free agent. On September 4, 2015, he was released by the Bills. On September 8, 2015, he was added to the Bills practice squad. He was promoted to the Bills' active roster on December 30.
