= Alphonso Smith =

American football player (1985–2026)

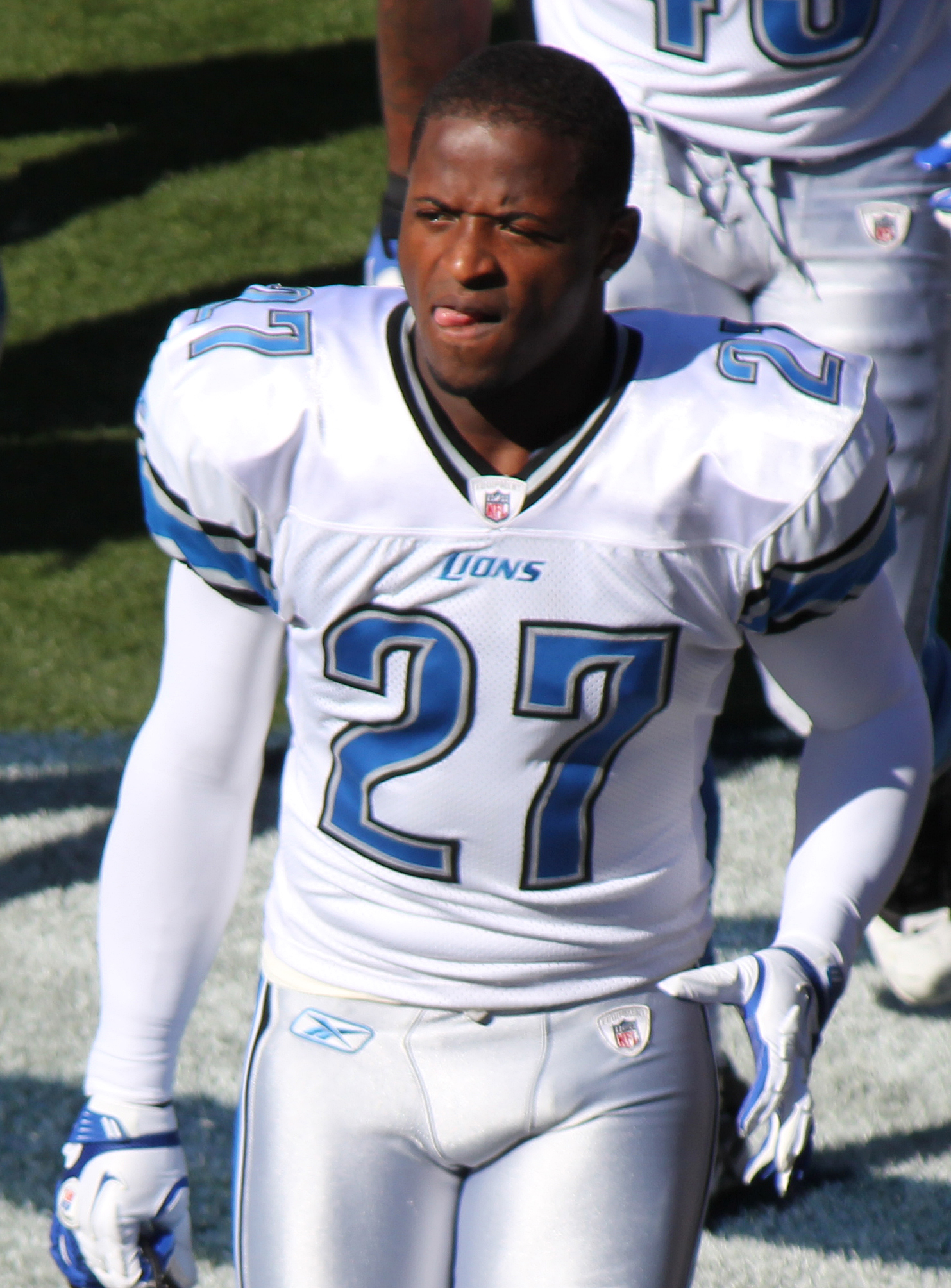
- Smith with the Detroit Lions in 2011

No. 33, 27
- Position: Cornerback

Personal information
- Born: October 20, 1985; Pahokee, Florida, U.S.
- Died: September 2, 2026 (aged 40); Pahokee, Florida, U.S.
- Listed height: 5 ft 9 in (1.75 m)
- Listed weight: 193 lb (88 kg)

Career information
- High school: Pahokee
- College: Wake Forest
- NFL draft: 2009: 2nd round, 37th overall pick

Career history
- Denver Broncos (2009); Detroit Lions (2010–2012)

Awards and highlights
- Consensus All-American (2008); Second-team All-American (2007); 2× First-team All-ACC (2007, 2008)

Career NFL statistics
- Total tackles: 88
- Forced fumbles: 2
- Fumble recoveries: 2
- Pass deflections: 19
- Interceptions: 8
- Defensive touchdowns: 2
- Stats at Pro Football Reference

Alphonso Smith Jr. (October 20, 1985 – September 2, 2026) was an American professional football player who was a cornerback for four seasons in the National Football League (NFL). Smith played college football for the Wake Forest Demon Deacons, and received consensus All-American honors. He was selected by the Denver Broncos in the second round of the 2009 NFL draft, and also played for the NFL's Detroit Lions.

== Early life ==
Smith was born in Pahokee, Florida, on October 20, 1985. He played quarterback and cornerback at Pahokee High School, and was runner up for the state Player of the Year award as a senior after leading the school to a 13–1 record and the Class 2B state championship. He earned first-team all-state honors as a senior cornerback, totaling 27 tackles, four interceptions and one sack. On offense, he threw for 2,400 yards and 32 touchdowns while also rushing for 640 yards and six scores as a senior. He also started on the school's basketball team.

== College career ==
Smith attended Wake Forest University, where he played for coach Jim Grobe's Wake Forest Demon Deacons football team from 2004 to 2008. Smith redshirted as a true freshman in 2004. As a redshirt freshman in 2005, Smith started all 11 games and finished the season with 60 tackles (52 unassisted), three interceptions, two sacks, 12 pass breakups and one forced fumble. He received first-team Freshman All-America honors from CollegeFootballNews.com, ESPN.com and Scout.com. In 2006, the sophomore played 14 games with three starts, registering 48 tackles (37 solo), three interceptions, four sacks, 11 pass breakups and one forced fumble.

As a junior in 2007, Smith started all 13 games as a junior for the Demon Deacons and had 44 tackles (36 solo), eight interceptions, three sacks, 18 pass breakups and four forced fumbles and returned three of the interceptions for touchdowns. He tied for first in the nation with a school-record eight interceptions and was first-team All-Atlantic Coast Conference (ACC) selection and received second-team All-America honors from Walter Camp.

In 2008 Smith started all 13 games as a senior for Wake Forest, totaling 37 tackles (28 solo), seven interceptions, 20 pass breakups and two forced fumbles and tied for first in the nation in both interceptions and pass breakups. He was a first-team All-ACC selection and a consensus first-team All-American. He was also named one of five finalists for the Bronko Nagurski Trophy. He continues to hold the ACC record for career interceptions (21), and broke the record previously held by Dré Bly of North Carolina in the 2008 EagleBank Bowl.

== Professional career ==
Pre-draft measurables
Height	Weight	Arm length	Hand span	40-yard dash	10-yard split	20-yard split	20-yard shuttle	Three-cone drill	Vertical jump	Broad jump	Bench press
5 ft 9 in (1.75 m)	193 lb (88 kg)	31 1/2 in (0.80 m)	9 3/4 in (0.25 m)	4.57 s	1.60 s	2.65 s	4.38 s	7.09 s	34 in (0.86 m)	10 ft 5 in (3.18 m)	13 reps
All values from NFL Combine

=== Denver Broncos ===
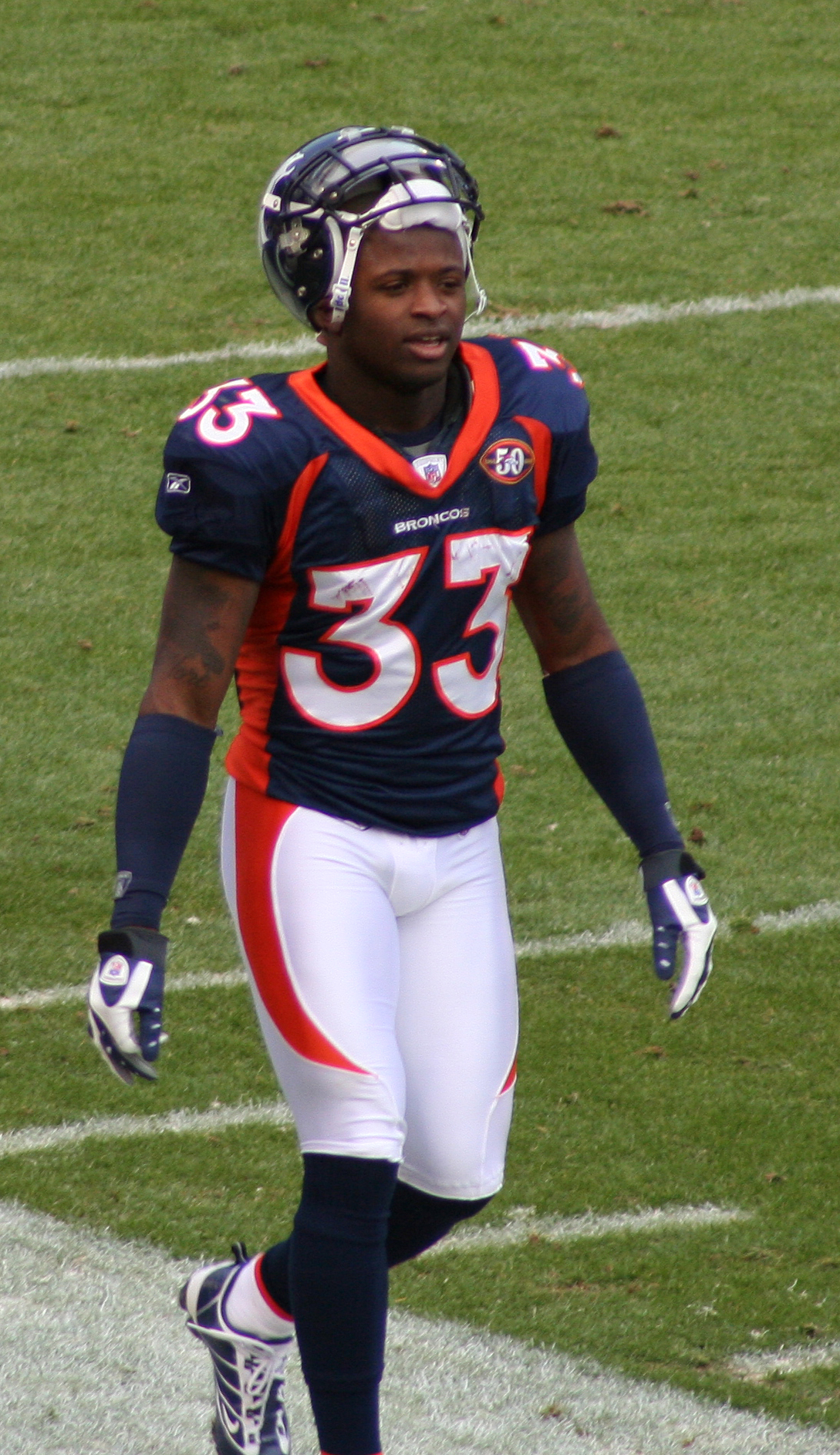
Smith in 2010 during his tenure with the Broncos

The Broncos selected Smith in the second round (37th overall) in the 2009 NFL draft. The Broncos traded their first round pick in 2010 in order to select him. This trade, among other poor decisions, led to the firing of coach Josh McDaniels. The pick Denver traded to Seattle was used to select Pro Bowler Earl Thomas. On July 26, 2009, Smith signed a four-year, $4.08 million contract with a $2.15 million signing bonus. The contract allowed Smith to earn $750,000 through a one-time playing-time incentive that was guaranteed for injury. In addition, if Smith won Defensive Rookie of the Year in 2009, he would have received $100,000. The contract also included a $50,000 workout bonus in 2011 and a $130,000 workout bonus in 2012. His base salary was $310,000 in 2009, $395,000 in 2010, $480,000 in 2011, and $565,000 in 2012.

=== Detroit Lions ===
On September 4, 2010, Smith was traded to the Detroit Lions in exchange for tight end Dan Gronkowski. He had his first career interception on September 26 against the Minnesota Vikings. The following week, Smith beat Green Bay Packers receiver Greg Jennings on a jump ball for his second career interception. In a home game against the St. Louis Rams on October 10, Smith returned an interception 42 yards for a touchdown in the Lions' 44–6 win. Against the Washington Redskins on October 30, Smith had a big interception late in the game to help the Lions comeback to beat Washington. He led the Lions in interceptions for the 2010 season.

A memorable moment of his Detroit tenure came in a Week 12 Thanksgiving loss to the New England Patriots in 2010. Coming into the game, Smith was first on the team with five interceptions. While the Lions were leading in the third quarter, Smith taunted New England quarterback Tom Brady with a finger wag after an incompletion. Brady would target Smith on three of his next four touchdown passes, as the Patriots ultimately scored 24 points unanswered to win 45–24. Overall, he was thrown at seven times accounting for five catches and three touchdowns, the last of which led to him being benched. Smith accepted responsibility for the turnaround, considering himself the catalyst and apologizing to the Detroit fans.

On August 31, 2012, the Lions released Smith as one of their final roster cuts. He was re-signed on October 18 due to injuries to Jacob Lacey and Bill Bentley. In Week 7 against the Chicago Bears, Smith was fined $15,750 for horse-collar tackling Brandon Marshall.

== Personal life ==
In November 2015, Smith was removed from his position as head coach of the Pahokee High School football team over allegations of unspecified "inappropriate conduct."

In July 2016, Smith was charged with domestic battery against his ex-girlfriend.

== Death ==
Smith died by suicide at a housing community in Pahokee, Florida, on September 2, 2026, at the age of 40. Hours before his death, Smith posted a suicide note on Facebook.

== NFL statistics ==
Year	Team	GP	COMB	TOTAL	AST	SACK	FF	FR	FR YDS	INT	IR YDS	AVG IR	LNG IR	TD	PD
2009	DEN	15	14	9	5	0.0	0	0	0	0	0	0	0	0	3
2010	DET	12	39	30	9	0.0	1	1	9	5	48	10	42	1	8
2011	DET	11	27	25	2	0.0	1	1	0	3	64	21	30	1	6
2012	DET	4	8	7	1	0.0	0	0	0	0	0	0	0	0	2
Career		42	88	71	17	0.0	2	2	0	8	112	14	42	2	19
