= Richard Ash (American football) =

American football player (born 1992)

No. 94, 76, 93, 97, 91
- Position: Defensive tackle

Personal information
- Born: August 4, 1992 (age 34); Hendersonville, North Carolina, U.S.
- Listed height: 6 ft 4 in (1.93 m)
- Listed weight: 315 lb (143 kg)

Career information
- High school: Pahokee (Pahokee, Florida)
- College: Western Michigan
- NFL draft: 2015: undrafted

Career history
- Jacksonville Jaguars (2015–2016); Dallas Cowboys (2016–2017); San Antonio Commanders (2019); Dallas Renegades (2020)*
- * Offseason or practice squad member only

Career NFL statistics
- Total tackles: 21
- Stats at Pro Football Reference

Richard Ash (born August 4, 1992) is an American former professional football player who was a defensive tackle in the National Football League (NFL). He was signed as an undrafted free agent by the Jacksonville Jaguars after the 2015 NFL draft. He played college football for the Western Michigan Broncos.

== Early life ==
Ash attended Pahokee High School, playing for the Pahokee Blue Devils football team, while being teammates with Janoris Jenkins and Merrill Noel. As a sophomore, Pahokee went 14–0, beating Newberry 53–14 at the Florida Citrus Bowl for the 2008 FHSAA Class 2B State championship.

As a junior, he tallied 84 tackles (7 for loss), 5 sacks, one interception, 5 forced fumbles and 2 fumble recoveries. As a senior, he registered 45 tackles (13 for loss), 4 sacks and 2 fumble recoveries. He was a four-star prospect according to Rivals.com.

== College career ==
Ash accepted a football scholarship from the University of Michigan. As a redshirt freshman, he appeared in 4 games as a backup nose tackle. As a sophomore, he appeared in 6 games as a reserve defensive tackle.

As a junior, he appeared in five games as a backup defensive tackle. He made his first career tackle against Ohio State University.

He transferred to Western Michigan University at the end of the 2013 season. As a senior in 2014, he appeared in 13 games (12 starts), while posting 42 tackles and 7.5 tackles for loss (third on the team). He had 7 tackles (3 for loss) against Purdue University. He made 6 tackles and 1.5 sacks against Ohio University.

== Professional career ==
=== Jacksonville Jaguars ===
Ash was signed as an undrafted free agent by the Jacksonville Jaguars after the 2015 NFL draft on May 11. He was waived on September 4. He was signed to the Jaguars' practice squad on September 6. On January 1, 2016, he was promoted to the active roster to play in the season finale against the Houston Texans.

He was released on September 3, and signed to the practice squad the next day. He was promoted to the active roster on October 25. He was released on November 26 after being activated for one game against the Tennessee Titans, and was re-signed to the practice squad three days later.

=== Dallas Cowboys ===
On December 28, 2016, Ash was signed by the Dallas Cowboys off the Jaguars' practice squad, with the team suffering multiple injuries along the defensive line and losing defensive end Zach Moore to the San Francisco 49ers. He was acquired to provide depth to play the last game of the season and rest Tyrone Crawford, Cedric Thornton and Terrell McClain for the playoffs. He played in the season finale against the Philadelphia Eagles and had 2 tackles (one for loss).

On September 2, 2017, he was waived and was signed to the practice squad the next day. On October 21, he was promoted to the active roster to improve the depth at the defensive line with Stephen Paea being placed on the injured reserve list.

On August 20, 2018, he was waived/injured with a knee injury and placed on the injured reserve list. He was released on August 24.

=== San Antonio Commanders ===
On January 5, 2019, Ash was signed by the San Antonio Commanders of the Alliance of American Football. On January 30, he was released by the Commanders as part of the final training camp cuts. He was added to the team's rights list and re-signed to a contract on March 25. He was activated to the roster on March 26. The league ceased operations in April 2019.

=== Dallas Renegades ===
In 2020, he was signed by the Dallas Renegades of the XFL. He was waived during final roster cuts on January 22. In March, amid the COVID-19 pandemic, the league announced that it would be cancelling the rest of the season. The XFL suspended operations on April 10.
