= Kevin Bouie =

American football player (born 1971)

No. 33
- Position: Running back

Personal information
- Born: August 18, 1971 (age 55); Pahokee, Florida, U.S.
- Listed height: 6 ft 1 in (1.85 m)
- Listed weight: 230 lb (104 kg)

Career information
- High school: Pahokee
- College: Garden City CC (1990–1991); Mississippi State (1992–1994)
- NFL draft: 1995: 7th round, 210th overall pick

Career history
- Philadelphia Eagles (1995–1996); San Diego Chargers (1996); Arizona Cardinals (1997)

Career NFL statistics
- Rushing yards: 26
- Rushing average: 2.4
- Return yards: 136
- Stats at Pro Football Reference

Kevin Lamont Bouie (born August 18, 1971) is an American former professional football player who was a running back for two seasons in the National Football League (NFL) with the San Diego Chargers and Arizona Cardinals. He was selected by the Philadelphia Eagles in the seventh round of the 1995 NFL draft. He played college football at Garden City Community College before transferring to the Mississippi State Bulldogs.

== Early life ==
Kevin Lamont Bouie was born August 18, 1971, in Pahokee, Florida. He attended Pahokee High School in Pahokee.

== College career ==
Bouie first played college football at Garden City Community College from 1990 to 1991. He transferred to play for the Bulldogs of Mississippi State University in 1992 and was a two-year letterman from 1993 to 1994. He rushed six times for 26 yards in 1992. In 1993, Bouie totaled 115 carries for 505 yards and three touchdowns while also catching 13 passes for 158 yards and two touchdowns and returning six kicks for 101 yards. He recorded 157 rushing attempts for 896 yards and six touchdowns as a senior in 1994.

== Professional career ==
Bouie was selected by the Philadelphia Eagles in the seventh round, with the 210th overall pick, of the 1995 NFL draft. He officially signed with the team on July 10. He was placed on injured reserve on August 22 and spent the entire 1995 season there. He was released by the Eagles the next year on November 22, 1996. He did not appear in any games during his stint with the Eagles.

Bouie signed with the San Diego Chargers on December 4, 1996, and played in one game for the team during the 1996 season but did not record any statistics. He was released by the Chargers on June 2, 1997.

Bouie was signed by the Arizona Cardinals on June 4, 1997. He played in five games for the Cardinals in 1997, rushing 11 times for 26 yards while also returning six kicks for 136 yards. He was released on November 17, 1997.
