= Pernell McPhee =

American football player (born 1988)

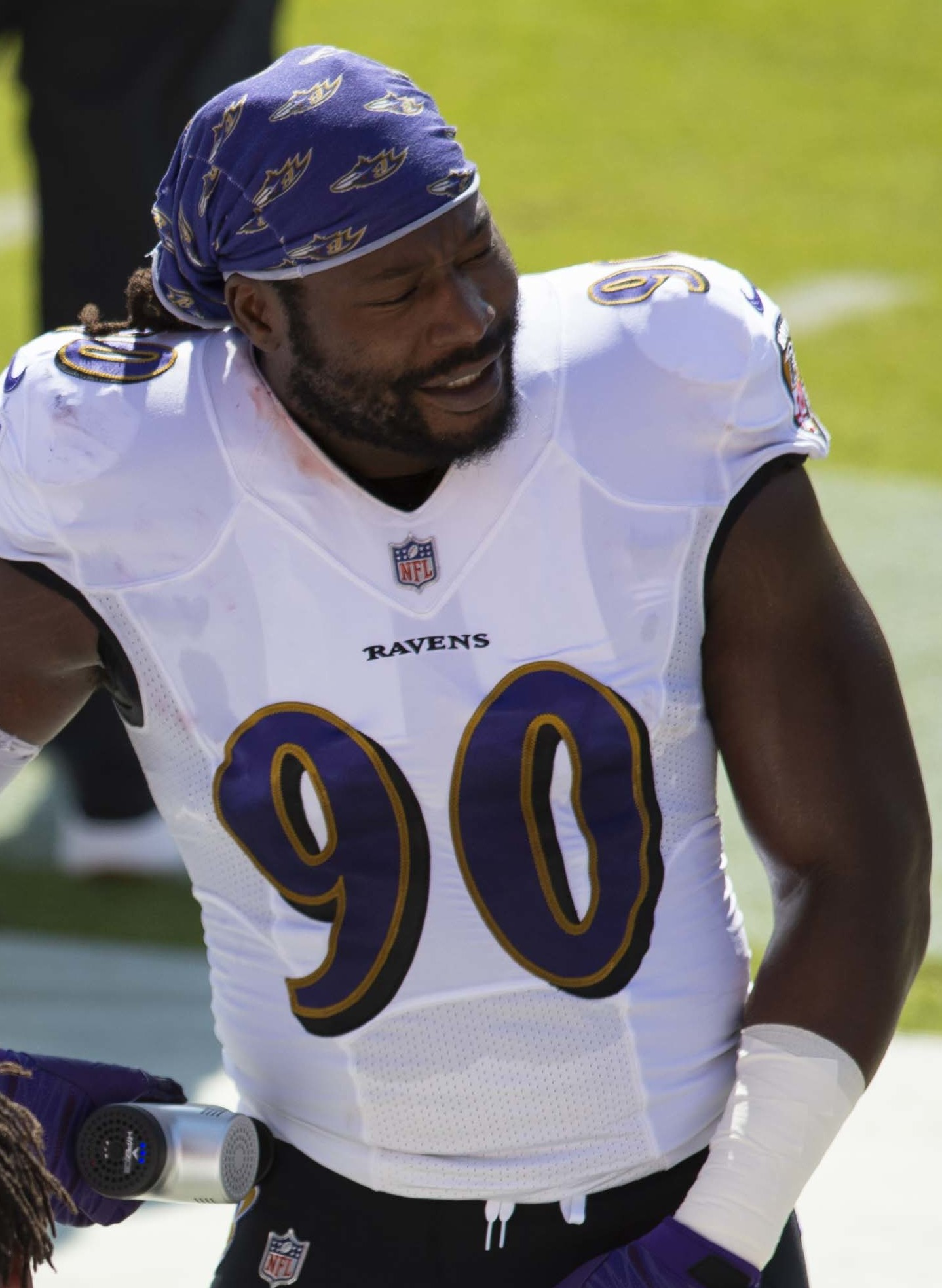
- McPhee with the Baltimore Ravens in 2020

No. 90, 92, 96
- Position: Defensive end

Personal information
- Born: December 17, 1988 (age 37); Orlando, Florida, U.S.
- Listed height: 6 ft 3 in (1.91 m)
- Listed weight: 269 lb (122 kg)

Career information
- High school: Pahokee (Pahokee, Florida)
- College: Mississippi State
- NFL draft: 2011: 5th round, 165th overall pick

Career history

Playing
- Baltimore Ravens (2011–2014); Chicago Bears (2015–2017); Washington Redskins (2018); Baltimore Ravens (2019–2021)

Coaching
- Michigan; Graduate assistant (2024); Outside linebackers coach (2025)

Awards and highlights
- Super Bowl champion (XLVII); NJCAA All-American (2008); First-team All-SEC (2010); Second-team All-SEC (2009)

Career NFL statistics
- Total tackles: 260
- Sacks: 38
- Forced fumbles: 6
- Fumble recoveries: 2
- Interceptions: 1
- Pass deflections: 16
- Stats at Pro Football Reference

Pernell McPhee (born December 17, 1988) is an American football coach and former professional football linebacker in the National Football League (NFL). He played college football for the Mississippi State Bulldogs and was selected by the Baltimore Ravens in the fifth round of the 2011 NFL draft. McPhee also played for the Chicago Bears and Washington Redskins. He was an assistant coach at the University of Michigan in 2024 and 2025.

== Early life ==
Pernell attended Pahokee High School, where he was teammates with Dwight Bentley and Janoris Jenkins. McPhee only played one year of high school football and started on both sides of the ball, playing offensive tackle and defensive end. He registered 75 total tackles, including 35 tackles for loss and 19 quarterback sacks to go along with 12 forced fumbles as a senior. He helped lead Pahokee to a 14–0 record that included a 25–11 win over John Brantley's Ocala Trinity Catholic for the 2006 FHSAA Class 2B State Championship. McPhee was named all-state following that season. In addition to his exploits on the football field, he was also a two-year starter in basketball. He originally signed with the University of Southern Mississippi out of high school before going the community college route.

== College career ==
Spent the first two years of his college career at Itawamba Community College in Fulton, Mississippi where he was named an NJCAA All-American as a sophomore, a season in which he led the nation with 13.5 sacks. During his career at ICC, he tallied 124 tackles (92 solo), 32.5 sacks, 73.5 TFL, 47 QB pressures, and 4 FFs in 18 games. In 2019, McPhee was selected to the ICC Athletic Hall of Fame.

After completing his two years at ICC he transferred to Mississippi State University. He was named to the coaches All-SEC first-team as a senior in 2010 and was named first-team All-SEC as a junior in 2009. He served as a team captain in 2010. During his Bulldogs career, he started all 25 of the games in which he appeared and totaled 91 tackles (46 solo), 7 sacks, 22 TFL, 20 QB pressures, 2 FFs, and 4 pass breakups. In 2009, he was twice named the SEC Defensive Lineman of the week.

== Professional career ==
Pre-draft measurables
Height	Weight	Arm length	Hand span	Wingspan	40-yard dash	10-yard split	20-yard split	20-yard shuttle	Three-cone drill	Vertical jump	Broad jump	Bench press
6 ft 2 5/8 in (1.90 m)	278 lb (126 kg)	34 3/8 in (0.87 m)	9 in (0.23 m)	6 ft 9 1/4 in (2.06 m)	4.80 s	1.72 s	2.78 s	4.59 s	7.13 s	28.5 in (0.72 m)	8 ft 11 in (2.72 m)	20 reps
All values from NFL Combine/Pro Day

=== Baltimore Ravens (first stint) ===
McPhee was selected by the Baltimore Ravens in the fifth round with the 165th overall pick of the 2011 NFL draft. McPhee collected 6.0 sacks as a rookie for the Ravens in 2011, plus 23 tackles and a forced fumble while playing in all 16 regular season games. On January 12, 2013, in the AFC Divisional Playoff against the Denver Broncos, McPhee recorded a strip-sack on quarterback Peyton Manning. The Ravens would go on win that game 38–35 in double overtime. On January 20, 2013, in the AFC Championship against the New England Patriots, McPhee tipped a pass from quarterback Tom Brady that led to an interception by Dannell Ellerbe with 6:49 remaining in regulation. This led to the Ravens winning that game 28–13 and earning a trip to Super Bowl XLVII, where they would defeat the San Francisco 49ers by a score of 34–31. McPhee switched from defensive end to outside linebacker for the 2013 season.

In the 2014 season, McPhee finished with a career high 7.5 sacks and a forced fumble.

=== Chicago Bears ===
On March 10, 2015, McPhee signed a five-year contract with the Chicago Bears. On September 27 on the road at CenturyLink Field, McPhee came up with two back to back sacks in a 0–26 loss to the Seattle Seahawks. In the 2015 season, McPhee led the team with 18 quarterback hits. McPhee started the 2016 season on the PUP list with a knee injury. He was activated to the active roster on October 20, 2016. In 2017, McPhee played in 13 games with five starts before suffering a shoulder injury in Week 15. He was placed on injured reserve on December 20, 2017. On February 26, 2018, McPhee was released.

=== Washington Redskins ===
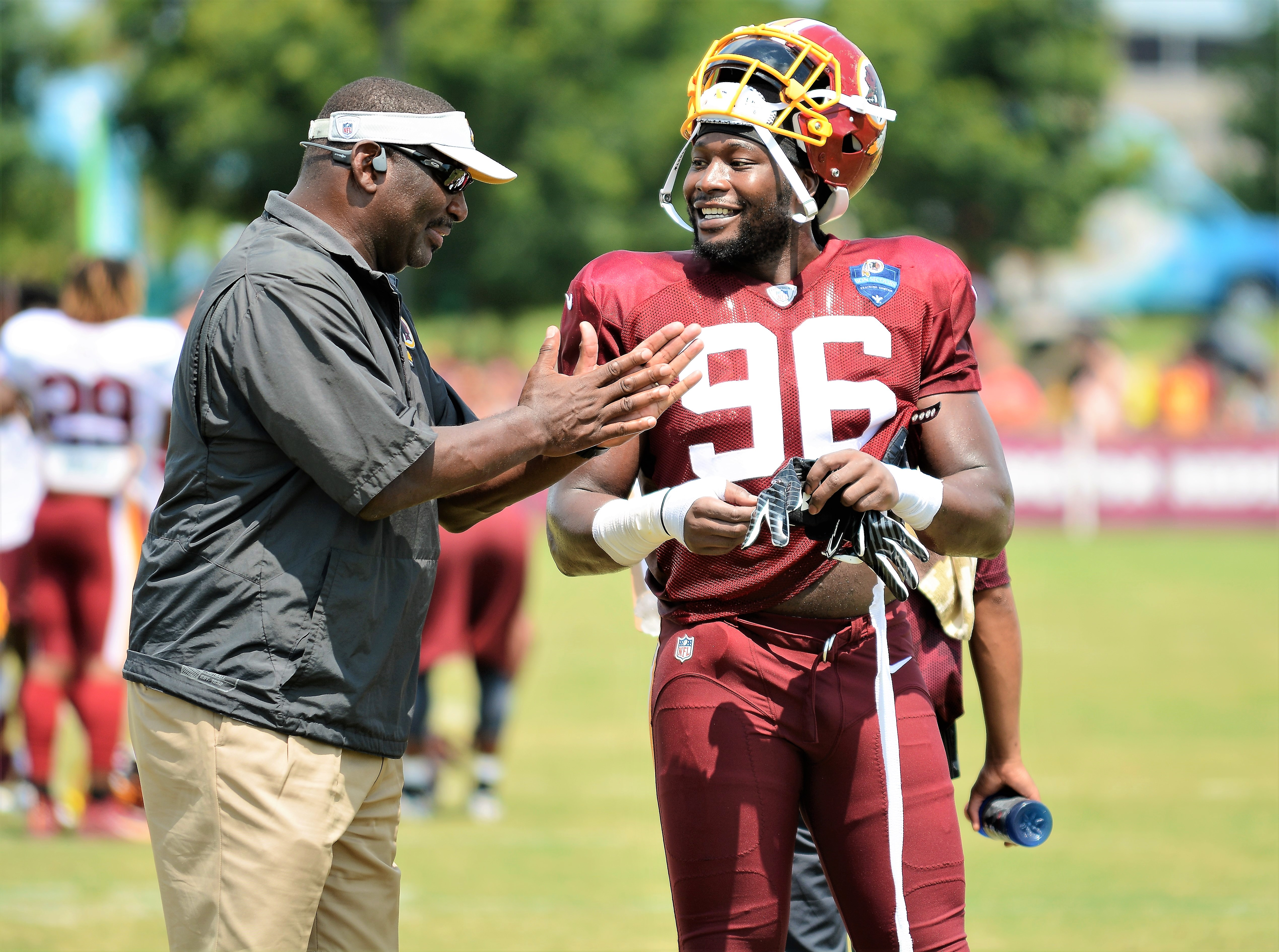
Doug Williams and McPhee during 2018 training camp

On March 26, 2018 McPhee signed a one-year, $1.8 million contract with the Washington Redskins. He made 13 appearances for Washington, recording two pass deflections, one fumble recovery, and 11 combined tackles.

=== Baltimore Ravens (second stint) ===
On May 17, 2019, McPhee signed with the Baltimore Ravens. He was placed on injured reserve on October 21, with a triceps injury.

On May 12, 2020, McPhee re-signed with the Ravens. He was placed on the reserve/COVID-19 list by the team on November 24, and activated on December 4.

On March 16, 2021, McPhee signed a one-year contract extension with the Ravens. On November 20, McPhee was placed on injured reserve with an knee injury. He was activated on December 20.

== Coaching career ==
In March 2024, McPhee was hired by the University of Michigan as an assistant football coach, coaching under his former defensive coordinator while at the Baltimore Ravens, and current Michigan defensive coordinator, Don Martindale.

== NFL career statistics ==
Legend
**Bold**	Career high

=== Regular season ===
Year	Team	Games		Tackles					Interceptions					Fumbles			
Year	Team	GP	GS	Cmb	Solo	Ast	Sck	TFL	Int	Yds	TD	Lng	PD	FF	FR	Yds	TD
2011	BAL	**16**	0	23	16	7	6.0	4	0	0	0	0	2	**1**	**1**	0	0
2012	BAL	12	6	21	18	3	1.5	4	0	0	0	0	0	0	0	0	0
2013	BAL	**16**	0	21	13	8	2.0	5	0	0	0	0	1	**1**	0	0	0
2014	BAL	**16**	0	27	17	10	**7.5**	**11**	0	0	0	0	**4**	**1**	0	0	0
2015	CHI	14	12	**53**	**42**	**11**	6.0	9	**1**	**13**	0	**13**	3	**1**	0	0	0
2016	CHI	9	0	16	13	3	4.0	5	0	0	0	0	0	**1**	0	0	0
2017	CHI	13	5	21	20	1	4.0	5	0	0	0	0	2	**1**	0	0	0
2018	WAS	13	0	11	8	3	0.0	3	0	0	0	0	2	0	**1**	**24**	0
2019	BAL	7	7	19	17	2	3.0	7	0	0	0	0	1	0	0	0	0
2020	BAL	15	**13**	34	26	8	3.0	3	0	0	0	0	1	0	0	0	0
2021	BAL	10	0	14	11	3	1.0	2	0	0	0	0	0	0	0	0	0
		141	43	260	201	59	38.0	58	1	13	0	13	16	6	2	24	0

=== Playoffs ===
Year	Team	Games		Tackles					Interceptions					Fumbles			
Year	Team	GP	GS	Cmb	Solo	Ast	Sck	TFL	Int	Yds	TD	Lng	PD	FF	FR	Yds	TD
2011	BAL	2	0	0	0	0	0.0	0	0	0	0	0	1	0	0	0	0
2012	BAL	**4**	0	4	2	2	**1.0**	0	0	0	0	0	**2**	**1**	**1**	0	0
2014	BAL	2	0	4	0	**4**	0.5	0	0	0	0	0	0	0	0	0	0
2020	BAL	2	**1**	**7**	**6**	1	**1.0**	**1**	0	0	0	0	0	0	0	0	0
		10	1	15	8	7	2.5	1	0	0	0	0	3	1	1	0	0
