= Sounds of The Four Tops =

The Sounds of The Four Tops is a Four Tops tribute show created by the American Soul Singer, show producer and actor Freddie Lee Peterkin. Peterkin is also known under the recording name of 'Freddie Lee' for the critical acclaim of his album Beyond Comprehension. The Sounds of the Four Tops is a unique Four Tops Tribute as the signature visual production and choreography does not imitate the original artists The Four Tops although the shows pays homage to the original artist's music with vocal presentations of The Four Tops hits. This show is one of three current touring productions which include Sounds of the Drifters and Sounds of the Temptations.

The choreography in his Four Tops tribute show are completely Peterkin's original dramatic works. His signature visual production consists of original choreographed works created by him between 1991 - 2009. His first known touring production Aces toured Europe in 1991 - 1998. The show Aces was part of the Pete Tobit British theatre show "Reach Out" from 1999-2001. Peterkin retained some of his earlier works in his 2004 Sounds of the Four Tops show. The Sounds of the Four Tops show has been subject of national newspaper reviews and interviews particularly in the British entertainment publication The Stage newspaper. Peterkin's style of show has since inspired many similar British Four Tops Tribute Shows.

Peterkin's dynamic stage production and dramatic works for Sounds of the Four Tops are inspired by the traditional Black Greek Fraternity "Step Shows" at Freddie Lee Peterkin's Alma Mater, Florida Memorial University which have a significant historic tradition. Peterkin choreographed routines for competition as part of Alpha Phi Alpha fraternity, Delta Psi chapter.

Controversy has been sparked as Freddie Lee Peterkin took action in 2009 against two British national touring theatre shows for misappropriating his original choreographed works. Peterkin is being represented by Leonard Lowy former inhouse solicitor for Island Records at Leonard Lowy & Co Solicitors. He also discussed the infringement case in a Sky TV interview in June 2009. His tribute production is the only known tribute production to have tributes. Rather than imitating the routines of the original artists, the two national Motown style theatre shows plagiarized Freddie Lee Peterkin's works without a license agreement or seeking Peterkin's consent. Both shows featured one former member of his Aces show and 3 former employees that worked for him from 1999-2003. In 2009 Peterkin discovered that the colleague who had stolen from him and the other group members had taken his original stage production and misappropriated the works as his own and contracted Peterkin's original dramatic works to "The Magic of Motown Theatre Show". Three former employees falsely claimed in the Herald newspaper that they had choreographed Peterkin's stage production in "How Sweet It Is" another British theatre show. His former employees were aged between 12-14 years old when Peterkin then aged 23 - 27 years old first created and performed the works to the public between 1989-1994.

Peterkin has since taken legal action against both the show producer of "The Magic of Motown", his former colleague from his group 'Aces' and his former employees in "How Sweet It Is" via Leonard Lowy and Co Solicitors, former in house solicitor for Island Records. Both shows gave notice that they would desist from using Peterkin's works but did not do so until 2010. Peterkin stated in interviews that he intends to still take the matter to the High Court to be acknowledged for his works and to seek compensation for the illegal use of his works.
