= Antone Smith =

American football player (born 1985)

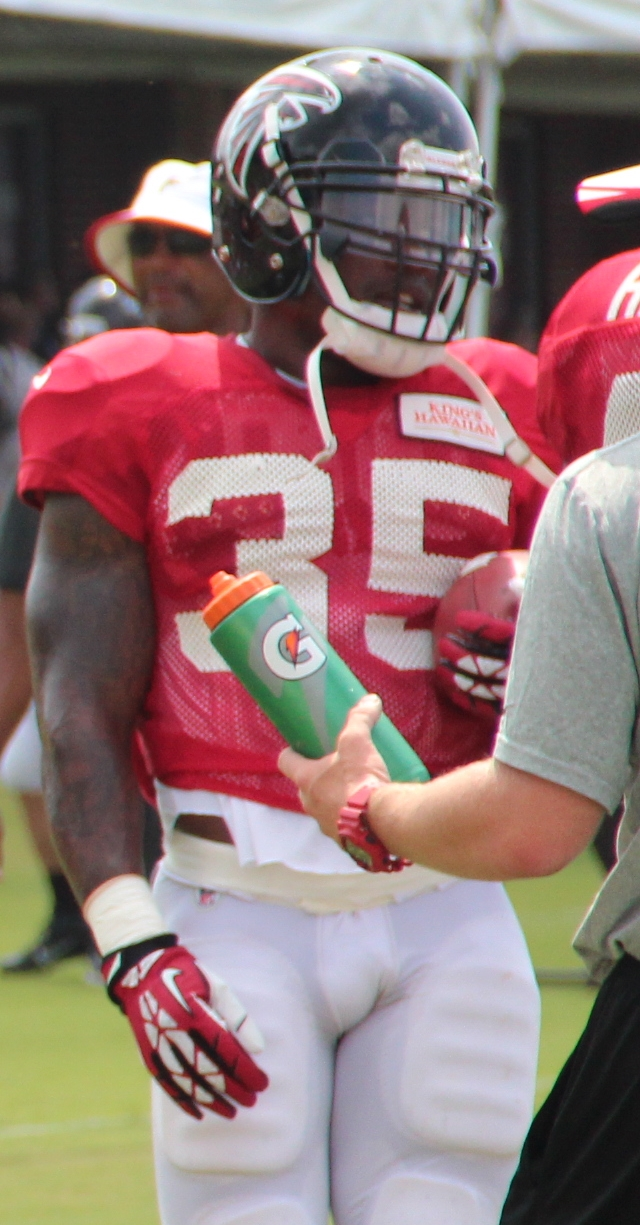
- Smith with the Atlanta Falcons in 2014

No. 35, 36
- Position: Running back

Personal information
- Born: September 17, 1985 (age 41); Pahokee, Florida, U.S.
- Listed height: 5 ft 9 in (1.75 m)
- Listed weight: 192 lb (87 kg)

Career information
- High school: Pahokee
- College: Florida State
- NFL draft: 2009: undrafted

Career history
- Detroit Lions (2009)*; Minnesota Vikings (2009)*; Houston Texans (2009)*; Atlanta Falcons (2009–2014); Chicago Bears (2015); New York Jets (2016)*; Tampa Bay Buccaneers (2016)
- * Offseason or practice squad member only

Career NFL statistics
- Rushing attempts: 40
- Rushing yards: 344
- Rushing touchdowns: 4
- Receptions: 21
- Receiving yards: 309
- Receiving touchdowns: 3
- Stats at Pro Football Reference

Antone Smith (born September 17, 1985) is an American former professional football player who was a running back in the National Football League (NFL). He played college football for the Florida State Seminoles. Smith was signed by the Detroit Lions as an undrafted free agent in 2009. He was also a member of the Minnesota Vikings, Houston Texans, Atlanta Falcons, Chicago Bears, New York Jets, and Tampa Bay Buccaneers.

== Early life ==
In his senior year at Pahokee High School, Smith led Pahokee to the state football title and rushed for 276 yards and three touchdowns in the championship game, finishing with 2,814 yards and 44 touchdowns on the season. During his four-year high school playing career he compiled over 6000 rushing yards.

Smith was ranked as the number 25 player overall by Rivals.com. He was a Parade All-American, the Palm Beach County Player of the Year, the Old Spice National Player of the Year, and was voted as Mr. Football for the state of Florida. Smith was voted the MVP of the Nike Camp and while there recorded an extremely fast 40-yard dash time of 4.25. He played in the CaliFlorida Bowl and was named the offensive MVP.

Smith was also on the school's track team, where he competed as a sprinter. At the 2003 FHSAA 2A Region 4 Championships, he won both the 100-meter dash and 200-meter dash with career-best times of 10.63 seconds and 21.71 seconds. He also spent a part of the spring with Florida State's track team. He finished fifth in the 60-meter dash at the 2006 ACC Championships, with a personal-best time of 6.83 seconds.

Smith was the focus and narrator of "The Muck Bowl," an independently produced feature-length documentary.

== College career ==
During his freshman year at Florida State in 2005, Smith saw action in nine games, playing behind Lorenzo Booker and Leon Washington. He carried the ball 36 times for 188 yards (5.2 avg) and three touchdowns, and was third on team behind Booker and Washington in carries, rushing yards, and yards per game. In Florida State's 55–24 blowout win over Duke University, Smith ran seven times for a season-high 76 yards and two touchdowns, the second of which came on a season-long 45-yard run where he eluded multiple Duke defenders.

As a senior, Smith led the ACC in touchdowns with 15, with 792 rushing yards on 177 carries (for a 4.5 yd average).

Smith ended his career with 2,253 rushing yards and 26 touchdowns.

== Professional career ==
=== Pre-draft ===
Pre-draft measurables
Height	Weight	40-yard dash	10-yard split	20-yard split	20-yard shuttle	Three-cone drill	Vertical jump	Broad jump	Bench press
5 ft 7 3/4 in (1.72 m)	191 lb (87 kg)	4.33 s	1.48 s	2.51 s	4.32 s	6.90 s	32.0 in (0.81 m)	10 ft 2 in (3.10 m)	31 reps
All values from Pro Day

=== Detroit Lions ===
After going undrafted in the 2009 NFL draft, Smith attended a Detroit Lions minicamp on a tryout basis in early May. He was signed by the Lions as an undrafted free agent on May 8, 2009, and released on July 27.

=== Minnesota Vikings ===
Smith was signed by the Minnesota Vikings on August 5, 2009, after the team waived wide receiver Aundrae Allison and was released by the team on September 1.

=== Houston Texans ===
Smith was signed to the Houston Texans practice squad on September 24.

=== Atlanta Falcons ===
Smith was signed to the Atlanta Falcons' practice squad on October 21, 2009, after the team waived quarterback D. J. Shockley. After his contract expired following the season, the Falcons re-signed Smith to a future contract on January 4, 2010. Smith was known mostly as a special teams player while in Atlanta, but did well with limited carries. In Week 12 of 2013, Smith rushed for 88 yards and a touchdown against the Tampa Bay Buccaneers. He also impressed during Week 13 when he rushed for over 50 yards and a touchdown against the Buffalo Bills.

During the first week of the 2014 season against the New Orleans Saints, Smith had 3 touches for a total of 61 yards, one of which was a 54-yard touchdown reception from QB Matt Ryan. In Week 11 against the Carolina Panthers Smith broke his leg covering a punt, which would sideline him for the rest of the year.

On March 10, 2015, Smith re-signed with the Falcons. On September 5, 2015, Smith was released by the Falcons with an injury settlement.

=== Chicago Bears ===
On October 12, 2015, Smith signed with the Chicago Bears. On December 23, 2015, Smith was waived by the Bears.

=== New York Jets ===
Smith was signed by the New York Jets on August 16, 2016. On September 3, 2016, he was released by the Jets.

=== Tampa Bay Buccaneers ===
On October 17, 2016, Smith was signed by the Buccaneers. He was placed on injured reserve on November 7, 2016, with a knee injury.
