= Eric Moore (defensive end) =

American football player (born 1981)

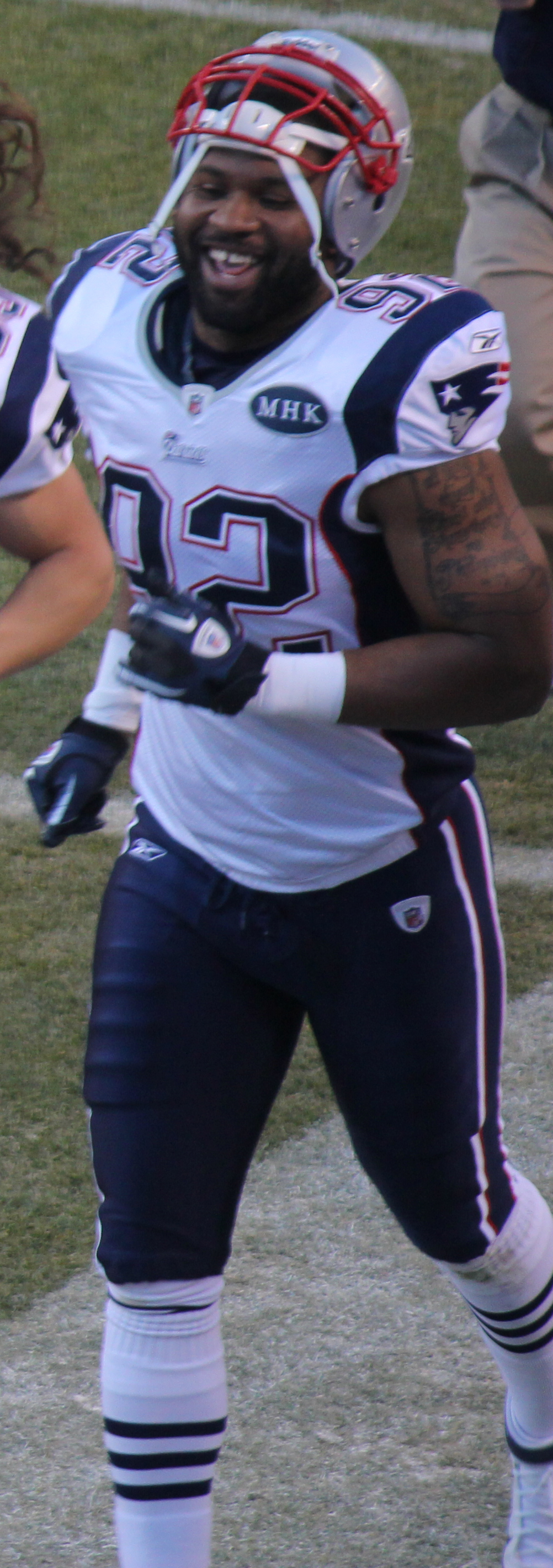
- Moore with the New England Patriots in 2011

No. 93, 92, 96, 66, 98, 95
- Position: Defensive end

Personal information
- Born: February 28, 1981 (age 45); Pahokee, Florida, U.S.
- Listed height: 6 ft 5 in (1.96 m)
- Listed weight: 268 lb (122 kg)

Career information
- High school: Pahokee
- College: Florida State
- NFL draft: 2005: 6th round, 186th overall pick

Career history
- New York Giants (2005); New Orleans Saints (2006); St. Louis Rams (2006–2008); Carolina Panthers (2009–2010)*; Florida Tuskers (2010); New England Patriots (2010); Virginia Destroyers (2011); New England Patriots (2011)
- * Offseason or practice squad member only

Awards and highlights
- UFL champion (2011); Second-team All-ACC (2003)

Career NFL statistics
- Total tackles: 45
- Sacks: 4
- Forced fumbles: 2
- Fumble recoveries: 1
- Pass deflections: 1
- Stats at Pro Football Reference

Eric Maurice Moore (born February 28, 1981) is an American former professional football player who was a defensive end in the National Football League (NFL). He was selected by the New York Giants in the sixth round of the 2005 NFL draft. He played college football for the Florida State Seminoles.

Moore also played for the New Orleans Saints, St. Louis Rams, Carolina Panthers, New England Patriots, and Florida Tuskers.

== Early life ==
Moore attended Pahokee High School, playing football and basketball. He was a Second-team USA Today All-USA selection and earned All-South accolades by Fox Sports Net. He helped lead his team to the state finals as a junior, recording 123 tackles and 10 sacks. He was second best linebacker in the nation coming out of high school.

== College career ==
Moore played college football at Florida State where he played in 41 games, recording 82 tackles and 14 sacks, 30.5 stops for losses, 34 quarterback pressures, 4 fumble recoveries, 4 forced fumbles and 8 pass deflections. In 2001, Moore was a reserve defensive end in Florida State's final nine regular season games as a true freshman. He recorded 15 tackles (8 solo) with an 8-yard sack and two stops for losses. He shared playing time at left end in 2002, finishing with 25 tackles (20 solo), 3 sacks, 11 stops behind the line of scrimmage and 9 pressures, despite missing three games after having his appendix removed mid-season. Moore took over right defensive end duties in 2003, earning Second-team All-Atlantic Coast Conference honors. He made 25 tackles (21 solo) with 7.5 sacks, 12 stops behind the line of scrimmage and 15 pressures in twelve games. He finished his senior season in 2004 with 17 tackles (8 solo), 2.5 sacks and 8 pressures.

== Professional career ==
=== Pre-draft ===
Pre-draft measurables
Height	Weight	40-yard dash	10-yard split	20-yard split	20-yard shuttle	Three-cone drill	Vertical jump	Broad jump	Bench press
6 ft 4 1/4 in (1.94 m)	262 lb (119 kg)	4.76 s	1.66 s	2.75 s	4.50 s	7.62 s	29 1/2 in (0.75 m)	9 ft 0 in (2.74 m)	22 reps
All values from NFL Combine.

=== New York Giants ===
Moore was selected by the New York Giants in the sixth round (186th overall) in the 2005 NFL draft. In his rookie season he played in eight games, recording five tackles. He made his debut against the Minnesota Vikings on November 13, 2005. He was released by the Giants on September 2, 2006.

=== New Orleans Saints ===
Moore was signed by the New Orleans Saints' practice squad on September 4, 2006. He was elevated to the 53-man roster on September 28, 2006, and made four appearances, recording five tackles before being waived on November 7, 2006. His first recorded sack was against the Philadelphia Eagles in 2006.

=== St. Louis Rams ===
Moore signed with the St. Louis Rams as a free agent on November 14, 2006, and made three appearances with three tackles. After being inactive for the first game of the 2007 season, Moore was waived by the Rams on September 15, 2007. He was re-signed to their practice squad on September 19, 2007, and was elevated to the 53-man roster on November 15, 2007. Moore played in seven games including his career first start against the Atlanta Falcons in Week 13. He finished the 2007 season with a career-high nine tackles and his second career sack. In 2008 for the Rams, Moore played in seven games, made 10 tackles and recorded another sack.

He was re-signed by the Rams on March 16, 2009. After spending the 2009 preseason with the Rams, Moore was placed on injured reserve on September 5, 2009, and was released with an injury settlement on September 9, 2009.

=== Carolina Panthers ===
Moore signed with the Carolina Panthers' practice squad on November 17, 2009. After finishing the 2009 season on the Panthers' practice squad, he signed a reserved/future contract on January 4, 2010. He was released on September 4, 2010.

=== Florida Tuskers ===
Moore was added to the roster of the Florida Tuskers of the United Football League on October 4, 2010, and spent the remainder of the 2010 season with the Tuskers. Moore lead the team with 6 sacks and 3 forced fumbles, with 1 recovery.

=== New England Patriots ===
The New England Patriots signed Moore on December 3, 2010. He was active for the first time in the Patriots' Week 14 win over the Chicago Bears, recording a strip-sack of Bears quarterback Jay Cutler in the game. In four games (three starts) with the Patriots in 2010, Moore had 14 tackles, two sacks, and two forced fumbles. He was released during final cuts on September 3, 2011.

=== Virginia Destroyers ===
Moore was signed by the Virginia Destroyers on October 11, 2011. He had 5 sacks and 2 forced fumbles. His team won the Championship in 2011.

=== New England Patriots ===
On December 10, 2011, Moore was re-signed by the Patriots. He was released on December 20, 2011.

=== Personal life ===
Eric Moore is currently married to Petrina Moore since October 20, 2020. He has two children, Olivia Moore born Oct 13, 2009 and Eric Moore Jr born August 10, 2012.
