= Liviu Tipurita =

Director and filmmaker

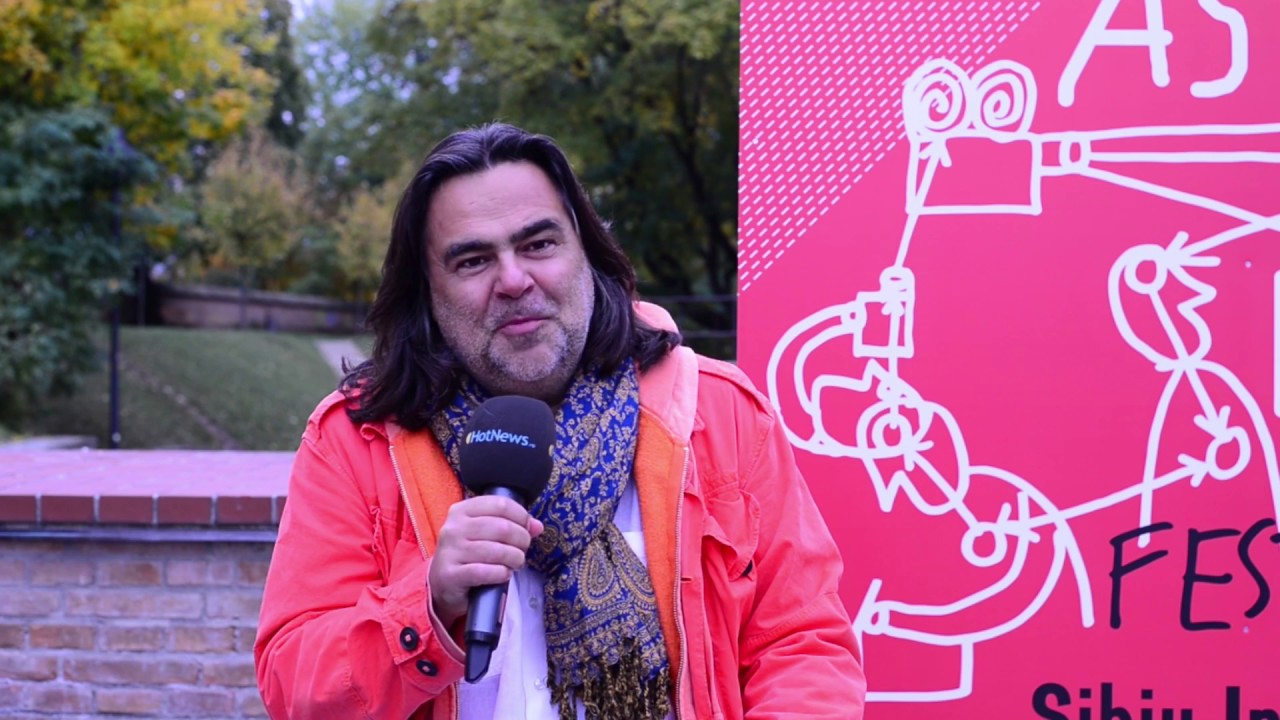
- Tipurita in 2016
- Born: Sibiu, Transylvania, Romania
- Occupation(s): Film director and producer

Liviu Tipuriţă is a Transylvanian-born British film director and producer. He has been nominated for an award by BAFTA.

== Early life ==
Tipuriţă was born and grew up in Sibiu, Romania. He later moved to the UK to study filmmaking in Newcastle and Edinburgh.

== Awards ==
In 2003, he won a George Polk Award for Television Reporting. He has won a National Headliners Award for Investigative Reporting, Erick and Amy Burger Award for Best International Reporting in the Broadcast Media Dealing with Human Rights (2003), Cine Golden Eagle Award/Investigative Category (2004), Foreign Press (FPA) Award for Best Documentary/TV Feature Story Of The Year (2009), Royal Television Society (RTS) Television Journalism Award/Current Affairs International Category, Prix Europa Special Commendation. (2010) Foreign Press (FPA) Award for Arts & Culture Story of the Year 2016, Special Award Astra Film Festival 2016 Impact Docs Award of Merit Special Mention 2017

== Selected filmography ==
- The New Gypsy Kings (2016)
- Numbers Joe (2015)
- Inside The Actors' Temple (2011)
- Britain's Child Beggars (2011)
- Gypsy Child Thieves (2009)
- Rogue Restaurants (TV series, 2008)
- Shoplifters Caught On Camera (2007)
- Conning The Conmen (TV series, 2007)
- Gypsy Witch (2006)
- Behind Closed Doors (2005)
- The Terror Suspect's Dad (2005)
- Easy Prey (2004)
- The Child Sex Trade (2003)
- Weekend (1998)
- Reflections (1993)
