= Pahokee High School =

Pahokee Middle-Senior High School

Location
- 900 Larrimore Road; Pahokee, Florida 33476; United States; 26°49′33″N 80°39′17″W

Information
- Type: Public middle school and high school
- School district: School District of Palm Beach County
- Superintendent: Donald E. Fennoy
- Principal: Dwayne Denard
- Teaching staff: 50.00 (FTE)
- Grades: 6–12
- Enrollment: 916 (2023-2024)
- Student to teacher ratio: 18.32
- Colors: white and Blue
- Mascot: Blue Devil
- Website: pmsm.palmbeachschools.org

- Old Pahokee High School
- U.S. National Register of Historic Places
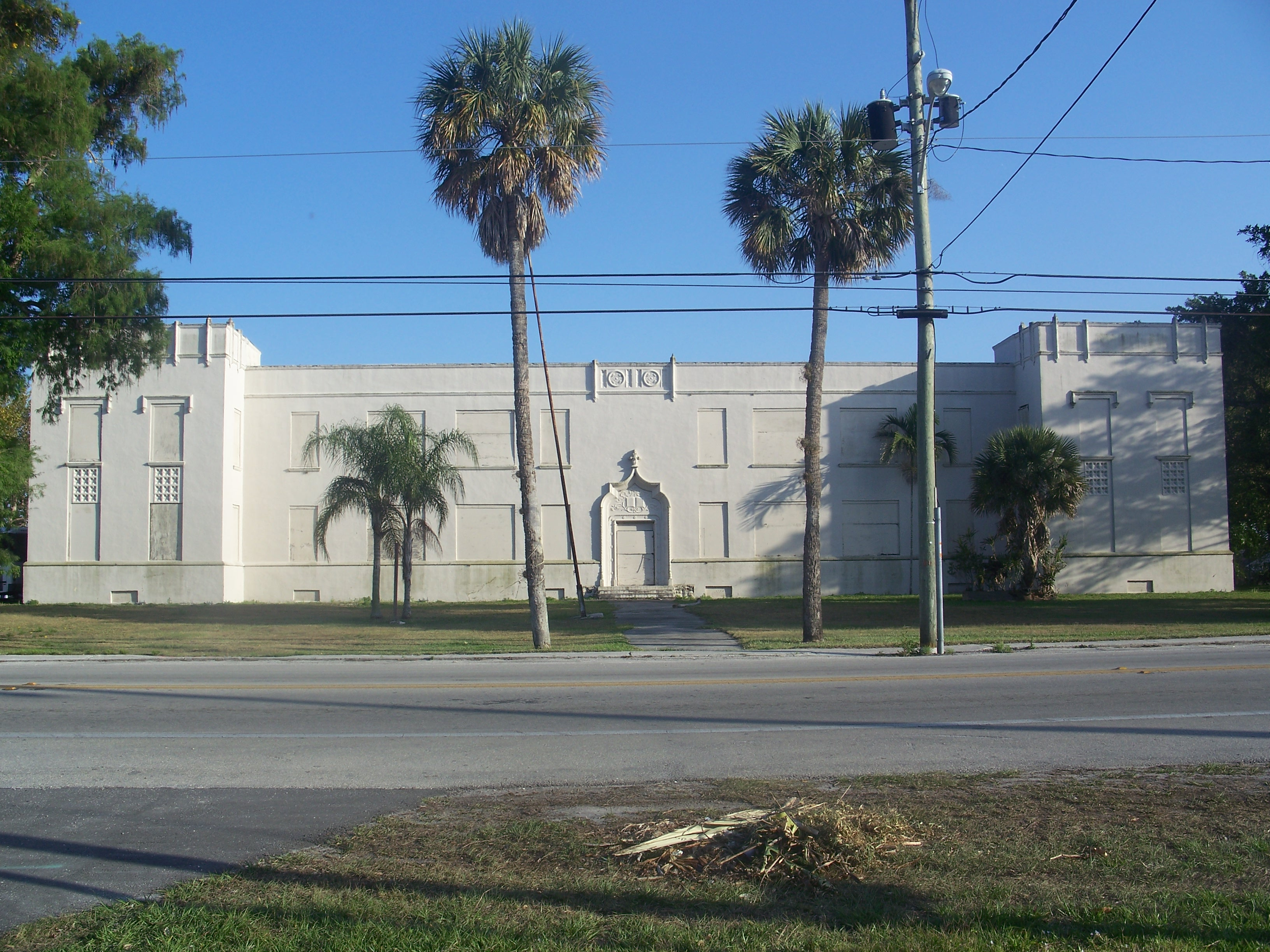

- Location within Florida Location within the United States
- Location: 360 Main St., Pahokee, Florida
- Coordinates: 26°49′30″N 80°39′47″W
- Built: 1928
- Architectural style: Mission/Spanish Revival
- NRHP reference No.: 96001334
- Added to NRHP: November 15, 1996

Pahokee High School (also known as Pahokee Junior Senior High School) is a historic school in Pahokee, Florida. It is currently located at 900 Larrimore Road. On November 15, 1996, The Old Pahokee High School building on E. Main St. was added to the U.S. National Register of Historic Places. It was designed by architect William Manly King. It has had a very successful football program and numerous NFL players have graduated from the school. It has a rivalry with Glades Central High School which also has a successful football program. The schools feature in Bryan Mealer's 2012 book Muck City.

== Athletics ==
Pahokee's football team, the Blue Devils, has won 6 state championships in 1989, 2003, 2004, 2006, 2007 and 2008, including a span from 2006 to 2007 which featured a 28–0 record, a #6 national ranking, and 2 state championships.

== Notable alumni ==
- Richard Ash, football player for Dallas Cowboys
- Bill Bentley, football player for Detroit Lions
- Anquan Boldin, football player for Arizona Cardinals, Baltimore Ravens, San Francisco 49ers
- Kevin Bouie, football player for multiple NFL teams
- Jim Burroughs, football player for Indianapolis Colts
- Rickey Jackson, Pro Football Hall of Fame linebacker
- Janoris Jenkins, football player for Tennessee Titans
- Pernell McPhee, football player for Chicago Bears, Baltimore Ravens
- Eric Moore, football player for New England Patriots, St. Louis Rams
- Alphonso Smith, football player for Detroit Lions
- Antone Smith, football player for Atlanta Falcons
- Vincent Smith, football player for Michigan Wolverines
- Mel Tillis, singer, Country Music Hall of Fame inductee
- Andre Waters, football player for Philadelphia Eagles, had CTE Chronic traumatic encephalopathy
- Riquna Williams, basketball player for WNBA's Las Vegas Aces
