= Bill Bentley (American football) =

American football player (born 1989)

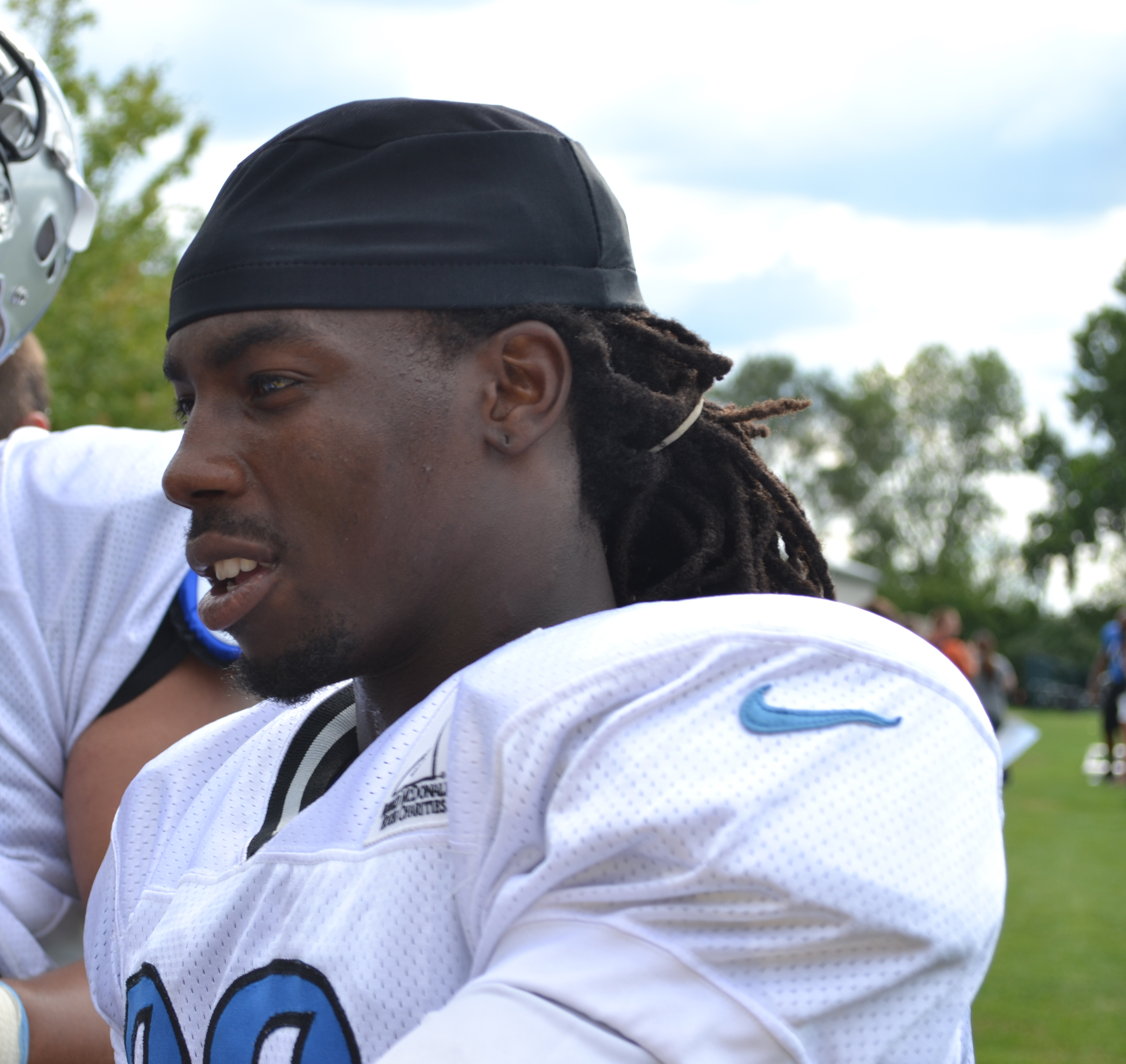
- Bentley with the Detroit Lions in 2012

No. 28, 41
- Position: Cornerback

Personal information
- Born: May 16, 1989 (age 37); Pahokee, Florida, U.S.
- Listed height: 5 ft 10 in (1.78 m)
- Listed weight: 188 lb (85 kg)

Career information
- High school: Pahokee
- College: Louisiana-Lafayette
- NFL draft: 2012: 3rd round, 85th overall pick

Career history
- Detroit Lions (2012–2015)

Awards and highlights
- First-team All-Sun Belt (2011)

Career NFL statistics
- Total tackles: 45
- Pass deflections: 5
- Stats at Pro Football Reference

Dwight "Bill" Bentley (born May 16, 1989) is an American former professional football player who was a cornerback in the National Football League (NFL). He played college football for the Louisiana-Lafayette Ragin' Cajuns and was selected in the third round of the 2012 NFL draft by the Detroit Lions.

== Early life ==
Bentley attended Pahokee High School in Pahokee, Florida, where he was teammates with Pernell McPhee and Janoris Jenkins. During his senior year, he led all defensive backs with 25 tackles, and also had 6 interceptions. Bentley was named to All-Area First-team and All-State Second-team. He helped Pahokee win three Florida Class 2A state championships. He did not receive any college football offers his senior year.

== College career ==
In 2007, he played a season at Dodge City Community College. He did not play that season, garnering himself a redshirt.

Considered only a two-star recruit by Rivals.com, his only scholarship offer came from Louisiana-Lafayette, which he accepted.

In 2008, as a redshirt freshman, he played in 12 games, starting first 10 at cornerback. In 2009, he played in 12 games, starting in 11 of them. He led all defensive backs on his team with 58 tackles and had three interceptions. He was named All-Sun Belt Honorable Mention for his performance that year. As a junior in 2010, he started in 11 games, missing one game due to an ankle injury. He recorded 58 tackles, including 3 for loss and one interception. In his senior season in 2011, he recorded 71 tackles, a new career high, including five for loss, and also had three interceptions. He was named to the second-team All-Sun Belt.

== Professional career ==
Bentley was ranked among the top ten cornerback prospects of the 2012 NFL draft. He was selected by the Detroit Lions with the 85th overall pick., the ninth cornerback selected.

Pre-draft measurables
Height	Weight	Arm length	Hand span	40-yard dash	10-yard split	20-yard split	20-yard shuttle	Three-cone drill	Vertical jump	Broad jump	Bench press
5 ft 10 in (1.78 m)	182 lb (83 kg)	30 1/4 in (0.77 m)	8 in (0.20 m)	4.43 s	1.58 s	2.52 s	4.50 s	6.99 s	31.5 in (0.80 m)	9 ft 6 in (2.90 m)	13 reps
All values from NFL Combine

On May 11, 2012, Bentley agreed to terms on a four-year contract with the Lions. On June 18, 2015, the Lions waived Bentley due to injury concerns. On November 18, 2015, the Lions signed Bentley after numerous injuries to cornerbacks. On December 29, 2015, Bentley was waived.
