= Pahokee, Florida =

- City
- City of Pahokee
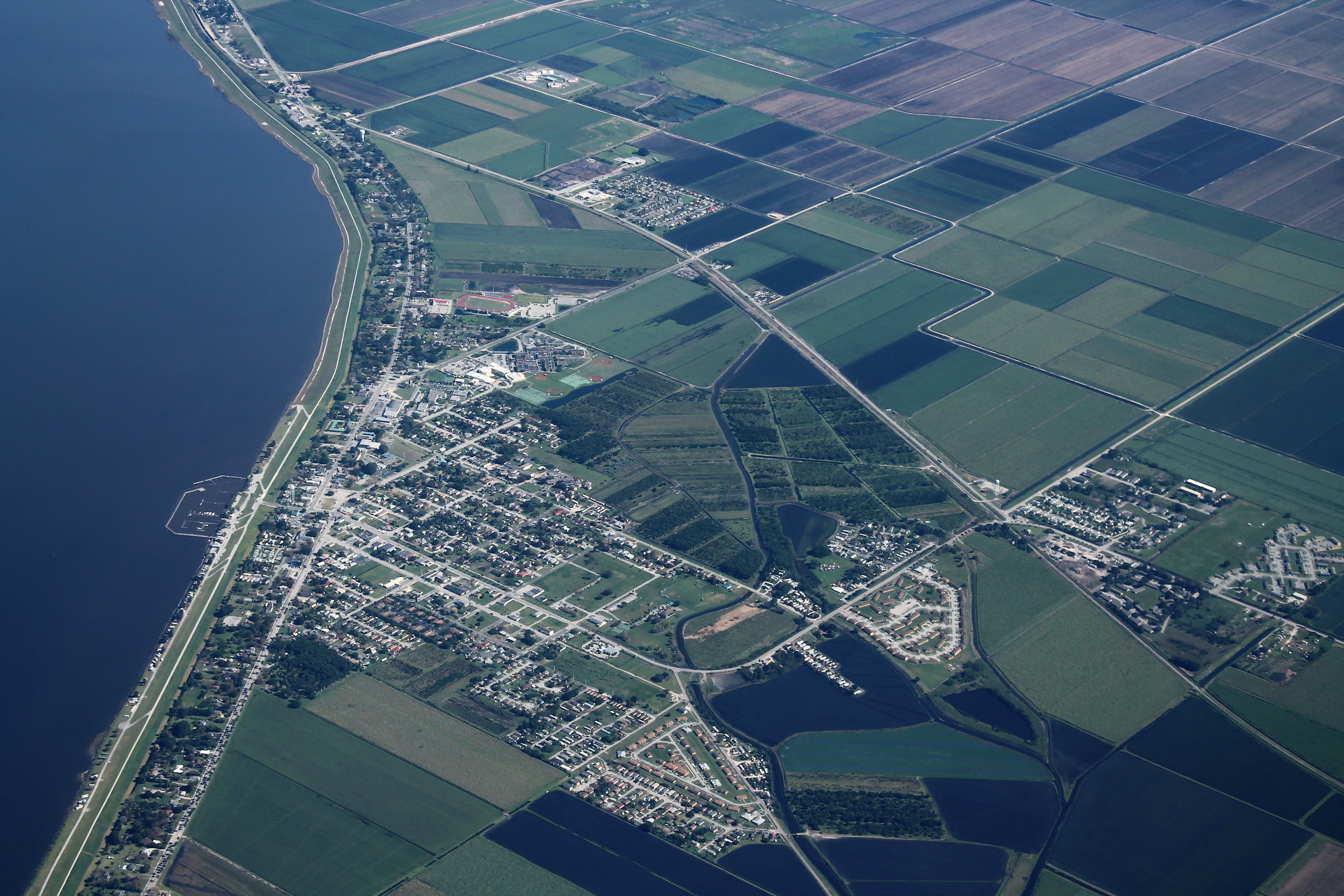

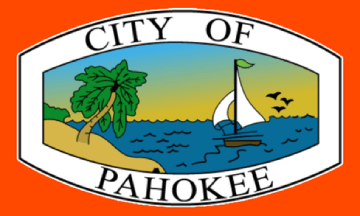
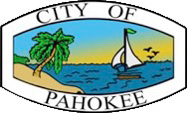
- Flag Seal
- Nickname: Muck City (shared with nearby Belle Glade, Florida)
- Location in Palm Beach County and the state of Florida
- Coordinates: 26°49′13″N 80°39′43″W
- Country: United States
- State: Florida
- County: Palm Beach
- Incorporated: 1922

Government
  - Type: Commission-Manager
  - Mayor: Keith W. Babb, Jr. (D)
  - Vice Mayor: Clara "Tasha" Murvin
  - Commissioners: Derrick Boldin, Juan Gonzalez, and Sara Perez
  - City Manager: Rodney D. Lucas
  - City Clerk: Tijauna L. Warner

Area
  - Total: 5.32 sq mi (13.77 km^{2})
  - Land: 5.32 sq mi (13.77 km^{2})
  - Water: 0 sq mi (0.00 km^{2})
- Elevation: 13 ft (4.0 m)

Population (2020)
  - Total: 5,524
  - Density: 1,039.3/sq mi (401.28/km^{2})
- Time zone: UTC-5 (Eastern (EST))
  - Summer (DST): UTC-4 (EDT)
- ZIP code: 33476
- Area codes: 561, 728
- FIPS code: 12-53800
- GNIS feature ID: 2404459
- Website: cityofpahokee.com/Pages/index

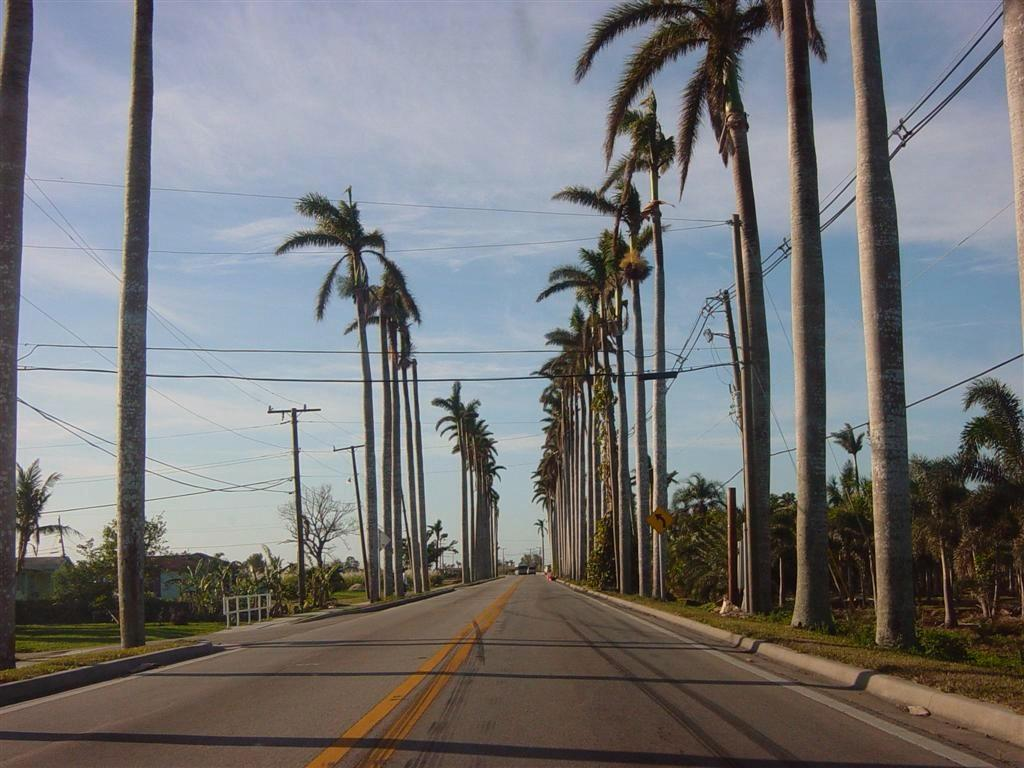
Royal Palms line the main thoroughfare through downtown Pahokee.

Pahokee is a city located on the south-eastern shore of Lake Okeechobee in Palm Beach County, Florida, United States. It is part of the Miami metropolitan area of South Florida. The population was 5,524 in the 2020 census.

According to the 2020 U.S. Census, 57% of the residents of Pahokee were African American and 33% were Hispanic or Latino. In 2018, the Mayor as well as four members of the City Commission were all African American.

== History ==
Pahokee was incorporated in 1922. The name "Pahokee" means "grassy waters" in the Creek language. Local residents refer to Pahokee as "The K" which is a part of "the Muck" and is known for the mineral-rich dark soil in which sugar cane, citrus fruits, and corn are grown by agribusinesses. In the 1930s, it was known as the "Winter Vegetable Capital of the World".

The city was severely affected, as were the other communities to the south of the lake, by the 1928 Okeechobee hurricane. Hurricane Wilma, in 2005, destroyed a newly built marina.

== Economy ==
Pahokee was founded on the produce grown in the muck, the fertile bottom of the Everglades after part of it was drained in the early 20th century. In 1939, the Federal Writers' Project guide said of Pahokee: "From Christmas until April, Pahokee is a 24-hour town; long trains of refrigerated cars roll out for northern markets day and night." "The streets are noisy and crowded; bars, restaurants and gambling places are never closed."

In 1963, with access to Cuban sugar restricted, a sugar plant was built, and agriculture shifted to the mechanized crop of sugar cane. The plant closed in 2009.

As a result, it is one of two Palm Beach County cities—the other is South Bay—on a list of 13 Florida municipalities in "a state of financial emergency." Records suggest it has been on the list continually since 1994. Unemployment exceeds 25%. Taxable property values dropped from about $99 million in 2007 to $66 million in 2014. A fifth of the population has migrated in the past 15 years. Dissolution of the city has been proposed.

On November 15, 1996, the old Pahokee High School building, built in 1928, was added to the U.S. National Register of Historic Places.

=== Everglades Regional Medical Center ===
Everglades Regional Medical Center, at 200 S. Barfield Highway was founded in 1936 as Everglades General Hospital; the current building opened in 1950. The 63-bed general hospital, financially nonviable, closed in 1998 after years of contention, a change from public to private ownership, and three lawsuits.

=== Glades Health Care Center ===
Adjacent to the former hospital, at 230 S. Barfield Highway, is Glades Health Care Center, a 120-bed skilled nursing facility, with about 70 full-time employees.

== Schools ==
=== Public ===
Pahokee belongs to the School District of Palm Beach County.

- Pahokee Elementary School, 560 East Main Place (grades pre-K–5). Enrollment: 375 (2015). Pahokee Elementary School is an IB (International Baccalaureate) school. Enrollment is 63% black, 35% Hispanic, 1% white, 1% other. 96% are from low-income families.
- K. E. Cunningham/Canal Point Elementary School, 37000 Main Street, Canal Point (grades K–5). Enrollment: 329. The racial makeup of the student body is 69% black, 29% Hispanic, 2% white. 99% of the students are from low-income families.
- Pahokee Middle-High School, 900 Larrimore Rd. (grades 6–12). Enrollment: 857 (2015). Enrollment is 68% black, 39% Hispanic, 2% white, 1% other. 93% are from low-income families.

Pahokee High School is best known for its football program that consistently ranks among the state's best. Pahokee, together with nearby rival Belle Glade, with whom it competes each year in the "Muck Bowl", has "sent at least 60 players to the National Football League". "In Muck City, football is salvation, an escape from the likelihood of prison or early death." "Football is the chief subject taught at Pahokee High," a town historian wrote in 1963. In 2014 five former Blue Devils were in the NFL, the second most from any high school in the country.

=== Public charter ===
- Glades Academy, 7368 State Road 15 (grades K–8). Enrollment: 195 (2015). Enrollment is 72% black, 18% Hispanic, 9% white, 1% other. 97% are from low-income families.

=== Private ===
- Everglades Preparatory Academy, 380 East Main St. (grades 9–12). Enrollment: 106 (2016). (There is another, unrelated Everglades Preparatory Academy in Homestead, Florida.) Enrollment is 92% black, 6% Hispanic, 2% white. 90% are from low-income families.
- The Shepherd's School, 1800 Bacom Point Road, a Christian school (grades K–12). Enrollment: 71 (2016).
- G.A.P Christian Academy, 183 S Lake Ave. (K–12 Education)

== Miracle Village ==
Miracle Village, founded by a minister, offers a small residential community for registered sex offenders, who sometimes have great difficulty in finding housing, or are homeless (see Julia Tuttle Causeway sex offender colony), because of Florida's strict regulations limiting where sex offenders can live. It is located about three miles east of Pahokee, on Muck City Road, in a former migrant worker facility, surrounded by sugar cane fields. This helps the offenders better integrate into society and not be a burden or commit further crimes in order to survive after serving their time mandated by the state and being released with little or no assistance from the Department of Corrections.

== Pahokee in the media ==
On December 18, 2009, Damien Cave, Miami Bureau Chief of the New York Times, wrote an article describing Pahokee's economic plight and the town's hopes that a new marina project might help rejuvenate business. In 2014, Governor Rick Scott pledged $1.3 million towards the restoration of Pahokee's infrastructure, in addition to $200,000 pledged by Senator Abruzzo.

== Creative arts about Pahokee ==
=== Movies ===
==== Chasing Rabbits (2008) ====
A short by Aaron Kyle. Rabbit hunting as running training for would-be football players. Famous Florida State football coach Bobby Bowden makes a cameo appearance. Days after its release, it was shown on ESPN, and an Adidas commercial was made using footage from it.

==== Murder of a Small Town (2015) ====
- James Patterson asks "What the hell happened here?" in the PBS documentary Murder of a Small Town, which examines unemployment, crime, drugs and high school football. The documentary deals with Belle Glade as well as Pahokee.

==== The Send-Off (2016) ====
- The Send-Off, a 12-minute short by Patrick Bresnan and Yvette Lucas, called an "intimate portrait" of Pahokee, was shown at the 2016 Sundance Film Festival. "Emboldened by a giant block party on the evening of their high school prom, a group of students enter the night with the hope of transcending their rural town and the industrial landscape that surrounds them." Along with others it was nominated for, it won three awards in 2016: the Golden Gate Award for Best Documentary Short at the San Francisco International Film Festival, the Grand Jury Prize – Special Mention, Live Action Short at the American Film Institute's AFI Fest, and the Grand Jury Award at the South by Southwest Film Festival.

==== The Rabbit Hunt (2017) ====
- The Rabbit Hunt, another short by Patrick Bresnan and Yvette Lucas. It differs from Chasing Rabbits in its approach to the topic, although the action scenes are similar. The rabbits are driven out of the sugar cane fields by the harvesting machinery, or by smoky, slow-moving fires (humidity is high) deliberately set after harvest to clean up leaves and other waste. The emerging rabbits are killed with clubs, gutted, skinned, cooked, and eaten, or sold to others as meat. Rabbits are a food source for a very poor community; the atmosphere has been called "primitive". "In the Florida Everglades rabbit hunting is a rite of passage for young men, practiced since the early 1900s. The Rabbit Hunt follows a family as they hunt in the fields of an industrial sugar farm." Everyone who appears in the film is African-American. It premiered at the Sundance Film Festival in 2017, and won the award of Outstanding Non-fiction Short in the Cinema Eye awards of the Museum of the Moving Image.

==== Pahokee (2019) ====
- Pahokee is a full-length (110 min.) feature from Bresnan and Lucas. It was shown at the 2019 Sundance Film Festival. The description of its content is: "In the rural town of Pahokee, four teenagers experience the joys and heartbreaks of their last year in high school. This tightly knit community in the Florida everglades struggles with financial insecurity and pin their hopes for the future on their graduating seniors."
  - The film was shown on PBS on February 16, 2021, in the series America ReFramed.

==== Outta The Muck (2023) ====
- Outta The Muck is a full-length (125 min.) feature from Ira McKinley, Bhawin Suchak, and Tracy Rector. The description of its content is: "Wade into the rich soil of Pahokee, Florida, a town on the banks of Lake Okeechobee. Beyond its football legacy, including sending over a dozen players to the NFL (like Anquan Boldin, Fred Taylor, and Rickey Jackson), the fiercely self-determined community tells their stories of Black achievement and resilience in the face of tragic storms and personal trauma."
  - The film was shown on PBS on February 6, 2023, in the series Independent Lens.

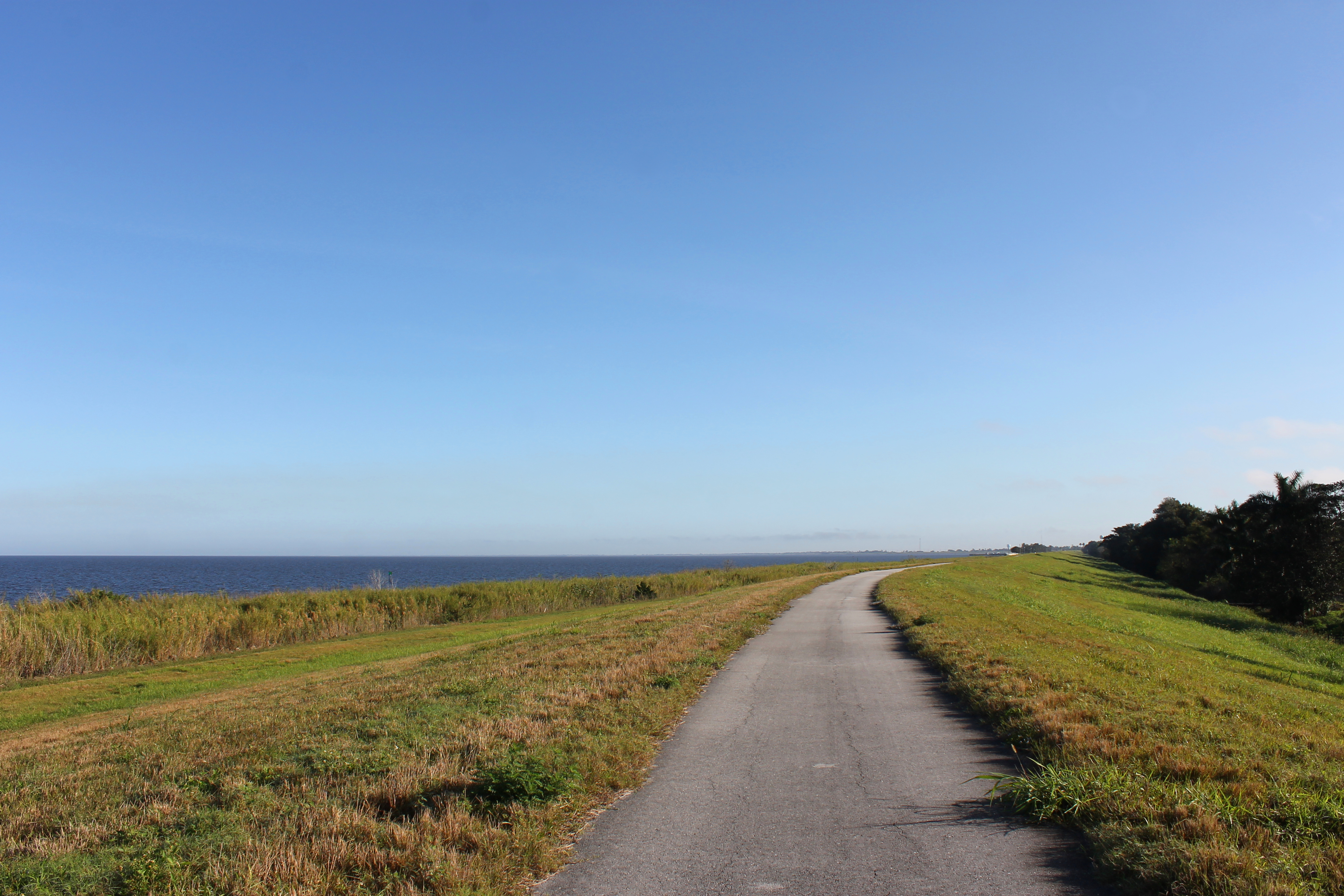
The Lake Okeechobee Scenic Trail in Pahokee

== Geography ==
According to the United States Census Bureau, the city has a total area of 5.4 square miles (14 km^{2}), all land.

Depending on the isotherm used, Pahokee has either a humid subtropical climate (Köppen: Cfa) or a tropical savanna climate (Köppen: Aw.)

== Demographics ==
Historical population
Census	Pop.	Note	%±
1930	2,256		—
1940	4,766		111.3%
1950	4,472		−6.2%
1960	4,709		5.3%
1970	5,663		20.3%
1980	6,346		12.1%
1990	6,822		7.5%
2000	5,985		−12.3%
2010	5,649		−5.6%
2020	5,524		−2.2%
U.S. Decennial Census

=== Racial and ethnic composition ===
Pahokee city, Florida – Racial and ethnic composition Note: the US Census treats Hispanic/Latino as an ethnic category. This table excludes Latinos from the racial categories and assigns them to a separate category. Hispanics/Latinos may be of any race.
Race / ethnicity (NH = Non-Hispanic)	Pop 2000	Pop 2010	Pop 2020	% 2000	% 2010	% 2020
White alone (NH)	813	546	457	13.58%	9.67%	8.27%
Black or African American alone (NH)	3,310	3,129	3,136	55.30%	55.39%	56.77%
Native American or Alaska Native alone (NH)	4	6	2	0.07%	0.11%	0.04%
Asian alone (NH)	29	17	22	0.48%	0.30%	0.40%
Native Hawaiian or Pacific Islander alone (NH)	0	0	1	0.00%	0.00%	0.02%
Other race alone (NH)	6	8	10	0.10%	0.14%	0.18%
Mixed race or Multiracial (NH)	60	32	60	1.00%	0.57%	1.09%
Hispanic or Latino (any race)	1,763	1,911	1,836	29.46%	33.83%	33.24%
Total	5,985	5,649	5,524	100.00%	100.00%	100.00%

=== 2020 census ===
As of the 2020 census, Pahokee had a population of 5,524. The median age was 36.1 years. 24.7% of residents were under the age of 18 and 15.0% of residents were 65 years of age or older. For every 100 females there were 108.8 males, and for every 100 females age 18 and over there were 113.7 males age 18 and over.

85.7% of residents lived in urban areas, while 14.3% lived in rural areas.

There were 1,687 households in Pahokee, of which 38.4% had children under the age of 18 living in them. Of all households, 39.2% were married-couple households, 21.0% were households with a male householder and no spouse or partner present, and 34.0% were households with a female householder and no spouse or partner present. About 23.2% of all households were made up of individuals and 9.8% had someone living alone who was 65 years of age or older. An ACS estimate for 2020 reported 1,227 families residing in the city.

There were 1,936 housing units, of which 12.9% were vacant. The homeowner vacancy rate was 2.3% and the rental vacancy rate was 11.1%.

=== 2010 census ===
Pahokee Demographics
2010 Census	Pahokee	Palm Beach County	Florida
Total population	5,649	1,320,134	18,801,310
Population, percent change, 2000 to 2010	−5.6%	+16.7%	+17.6%
Population density	1,019.7/sq mi	670.2/sq mi	350.6/sq mi
White or Caucasian (including White Hispanic)	28.9%	73.5%	75.0%
(Non-Hispanic White or Caucasian)	9.7%	60.1%	57.9%
Black or African-American	55.4%	17.3%	16.0%
Hispanic or Latino (of any race)	33.8%	19.0%	22.5%
Asian	0.3%	2.4%	2.4%
Native American or Native Alaskan	0.1%	0.5%	0.4%
Pacific Islander or Native Hawaiian	0.0%	0.1%	0.1%
Two or more races (Multiracial)	0.6%	2.3%	2.5%
Some Other Race	0.1%	3.9%	3.6%

As of the 2010 United States census, there were 5,649 people, 1,749 households, and 1,219 families residing in the city.

=== 2000 census ===
As of the US census of 2000, there were 5,985 people, 1,710 households, and 1,328 families residing in the city. The population density was 1,109.4 inhabitants per square mile (428.3/km^{2}). There were 1,936 housing units at an average density of 358.9 per square mile (138.6/km^{2}). The racial makeup of the city was 25.21% White (13.6% Non-Hispanic White), 56.06% African American, 0.10% Native American, 0.50% Asian, 15.20% from other races, and 2.92% from two or more races. Hispanic or Latino of any race were 29.46% of the population.

As of 2000, there were 1,710 households, out of which 44.0% had children under the age of 18 living with them, 46.3% were married couples living together, 22.8% had a female householder with no husband present, and 22.3% were non-families. 18.8% of all households were made up of individuals, and 6.4% had someone living alone who was 65 years of age or older. The average household size was 3.35 and the average family size was 3.79.

In 2000, in the city, 38.4% of the population were under the age of 18, 10.3% were aged 18 to 24, 25.0% from 25 to 44, 18.1% from 45 to 64, and 8.2% were 65 years of age or older. The median age was 26 years. For every 100 females, there were 104.2 males. For every 100 females age 18 and over, there were 100.2 males.

In 2000, the median income for a household in the city was $26,731, and the median income for a family was $26,265. Males had a median income of $28,859 versus $20,066 for females. The per capita income for the city was $10,346. About 29.4% of families and 32.0% of the population were below the poverty line, including 39.9% of those under age 18 and 32.0% of those age 65 or over.

In 2000, 72.78% of the population spoke only English at home, while those who spoke Spanish made up 26.65%, and those who spoke French Creole made up 0.56%.

== Notable people ==
- Reidel Anthony, NFL wide receiver, 1996 Florida Gators football team, Tampa Bay Buccaneers
- Bill Bentley, NFL cornerback, Louisiana-Lafayette, Detroit Lions
- Roosevelt Blackmon, NFL cornerback, Green Bay Packers, Cincinnati Bengals
- Anquan Boldin, NFL wide receiver, Florida State University, Baltimore Ravens
- Kevin Bouie, NFL running back, Mississippi State University
- Zabian Dowdell, basketball player for Phoenix Suns
- Rickey Jackson, NFL linebacker, New Orleans Saints and San Francisco 49ers, NFL Hall Of Fame
- Janoris Jenkins, NFL cornerback, St. Louis Rams, New York Giants, New Orleans Saints
- Jorge Labarga, Florida Supreme Court Justice
- Pernell McPhee, linebacker, Baltimore Ravens
- Joe Milton, quarterback, New England Patriots, Dallas Cowboys, & Philadelphia Eagles
- Eric Moore, NFL Defensive end, New England Patriots
- Freddie Lee Peterkin, minister, soul and gospel singer and actor
- Alphonso Smith, NFL cornerback, Detroit Lions
- Antone Smith, NFL running back, Florida State and Atlanta Falcons
- Vincent Smith, running back, University of Michigan
- Fred Taylor, NFL running back, Jacksonville Jaguars
- Mel Tillis, country musician, born in Tampa, raised in Pahokee
- Andre Waters, defensive back, Philadelphia Eagles
- Riquna Williams, basketball player, University of Miami and WNBA's Los Angeles Sparks
