= NCAA Division II men's outdoor track and field championships =

Track and field championships

- Association: NCAA
- Sport: College outdoor track and field
- Founded: 1963; 63 years ago
- Division: Division II
- Region: United States; Canada
- Most recent champion: Grand Valley State (2nd)
- Most titles: Abilene Christian (19)
- Broadcaster: ESPNU
- Website: NCAA.com

The NCAA Division II men's outdoor track and field championships (known as the NCAA College Division outdoor track and field championships between 1963 and 1972) are contested at an annual track meet hosted by the National Collegiate Athletic Association to determine the team and individual national champions of men's collegiate outdoor track and field among its Division II members in the United States and Canada. It has been held annually since 1963.

The most successful program has been Abilene Christian, with nineteen titles. After the Wildcats' departure to Division I, the active program with the most championships is St. Augustine's, with 16.

The reigning champions are Grand Valley State, who won their second national title in 2026.

== Events ==
=== Track events ===
- Sprint events
  - 100 meter dash
  - 200 meter dash
  - 400 meter dash
- Distance events
  - 800 meter run
  - 1,500 meter run
  - 3,000 meter steeplechase
  - 5,000 meter run
  - 10,000 meter run
- Hurdle Events
  - 110 meter hurdles
  - 400 meter intermediate hurdles
- Relay events
  - 400 meter relay
  - 1,600 meter relay

=== Field events ===
- Jumping events
  - High jump
  - Pole vault
  - Long jump
  - Triple jump
- Throwing events
  - Shot put
  - Discus throw
  - Hammer throw
  - Javelin throw
- Multi-events
  - Decathlon

=== Discontinued events ===
- Sprint events
  - 100 yard dash
  - 220 yard dash
  - 440 yard dash
  - 880 yard dash
- Distance events
  - Mile run
  - Three-mile run
  - Six-mile run
- Hurdle events
  - 120 yard high hurdles
  - 440 yard intermediate hurdles
- Relay events
  - 440 yard relay
  - Mile relay

== Summary ==
=== Scoring procedures ===
Athletes' individual performances earn points for their institution and the team with the most points receives the NCAA team title in track and field.

- 1963–81: 10 (1st), 8 (2nd), 6 (3rd), 4 (4th), 2 (5th), 1 (6th)
- 1982–84: 15 (1st), 12 (2nd), 10 (3rd), 9 (4th), 8 (5th), 7 (6th), 6 (7th), 5 (8th), 4 (9th), 3 (10th), 2 (11th), 1 (12th)
- 1985–present: 10 (1st), 8 (2nd), 6 (3rd), 5 (4th), 4 (5th), 3 (6th), 2 (7th), 1 (8th)

=== Results ===
NCAA Division II Men's Outdoor Track and Field Championships
Year	Site	Stadium	Championship Results			
Year	Site	Stadium	Winner	Points	Runners-up	Points
1963; Details	Chicago, IL (Chicago)	Stagg Field	Maryland State	98	Fresno State	64
1964; Details	Fresno, CA (Fresno State)	Ratcliffe Stadium	Fresno State	87	Long Beach State	57
1965; Details	Long Beach, CA (Long Beach State)	Veterans Stadium	San Diego State	67	Luther	46
1966; Details	Chicago, IL (Chicago)	Stagg Field	San Diego State (2)	67	Long Beach State	56
1967; Details	Ogden, UT (Weber State)	Stewart Stadium	Long Beach State	77	UC Santa Barbara	37
1968; Details	Hayward, CA (Cal State–Hayward)	Pioneer Stadium	Cal Poly SLO	62	UC Santa Barbara	48
1969; Details	Ashland, OH (Ashland)	Jack Miller Stadium	Cal Poly SLO (2)	76	Occidental	43
1970; Details	Saint Paul, MN (Macalester)	Macalester Stadium	Cal Poly SLO (3)	49	C.W. Post	45
1971; Details	Sacramento, CA (Sacramento State)	Hornet Stadium	Kentucky State	42	Cal Poly SLO	31
1972; Details	Ashland, OH (Ashland)	Jack Miller Stadium	Eastern Michigan	93	Norfolk State	49
1973; Details	Crawfordsville, IN (Wabash)	Little Giant Stadium	Norfolk State	54	Lincoln (MO)	48
1974; Details	Charleston, IL (Eastern Illinois)	O'Brien Stadium	Eastern Illinois; Norfolk State	51	Cal Poly–SLO	48½
1975; Details	Sacramento, CA (Sacramento State)	Hornet Stadium	Cal State Northridge	57	Southeastern Louisiana	50
1976; Details	Slippery Rock, PA (Slippery Rock State)	N. Kerr Thompson Stadium	UC Irvine	56	Eastern Illinois	39
1977; Details	Fargo, ND (North Dakota State)	Dacotah Field	Cal State Hayward	66	UC Irvine	58
1978; Details	Macomb, IL (Western Illinois)	Hanson Field	Los Angeles State	70	Cal Poly SLO	59½
1979; Details	Macomb, IL (Western Illinois)	Hanson Field	Cal Poly SLO (4)	95	Cal State Northridge	51
1980; Details	Pomona, CA (Cal Poly Pomona)	Kellogg Field	Cal Poly SLO (5)	53	Los Angeles State	48
1981; Details	Macomb, IL (Western Illinois)	Hanson Field	Cal Poly SLO (6)	92	Southern Connecticut State	39
1982; Details	Sacramento, CA (Sacramento State)	Hornet Stadium	Abilene Christian	121	Cal Poly–SLO	94½
1983; Details	Cape Girardeau, MO (Southeast Missouri State)	Houck Stadium	Abilene Christian (2)	169½	Angelo State	145
1984; Details	Cape Girardeau, MO (Southeast Missouri State)	Houck Stadium	Abilene Christian (3)	246	Angelo State	129
1985; Details	Los Angeles, CA (Los Angeles State)	Jesse Owens Track	Abilene Christian (4)	170½	East Texas State	64
1986; Details	Los Angeles, CA (Los Angeles State)	Jesse Owens Track	Abilene Christian (5)	142	Southeast Missouri State	60
1987; Details	Cape Girardeau, MO (Southeast Missouri State)	Houck Stadium	Abilene Christian (6)	127	Southeast Missouri State	93
1988; Details	San Angelo, TX (Angelo State)	Multi-Sports Complex	Abilene Christian (7)	112	St. Augustine's	75
1989; Details	Hampton, VA (Hampton)	Armstrong Stadium	St. Augustine's	107½	Angelo State	84
1990; Details	Hampton, VA (Hampton)	Armstrong Stadium	St. Augustine's (2)	111	Cal State Northridge	60
1991; Details	San Angelo, TX (Angelo State)	Multi-Sports Complex	St. Augustine's (3)	120	Angelo State	63½
1992; Details	San Angelo, TX (Angelo State)	Multi-Sports Complex	St. Augustine's (4)	95	Abilene Christian	63
1993; Details	Abilene, TX (Abilene Christian)	Elmer J. Gray Stadium	St. Augustine's (5)	116	Abilene Christian	107
1994; Details	Raleigh, NC (St. Augustine's)	George Williams Athletic Complex	St. Augustine's (6)	118	Abilene Christian	117
1995; Details	Emporia, KS (Emporia State)	Francis G. Welch Stadium	St. Augustine's (7)	140½	Abilene Christian	95
1996; Details	Riverside, CA (UC Riverside)	UC Riverside Track Facility	Abilene Christian (8)	149	St. Augustine's	77½
1997; Details	Edwardsville, IL (SIU Edwardsville)	Ralph Korte Stadium	Abilene Christian (9)	151	St. Augustine's	69
1998; Details	Edwardsville, IL (SIU Edwardsville)	Ralph Korte Stadium	St. Augustine's (8)	97	Abilene Christian	80
1999; Details	Emporia, KS (Emporia State)	Francis G. Welch Stadium	Abilene Christian (10)	93	St. Augustine's	73
2000; Details	Raleigh, NC (Saint Augustine's)	George Williams Athletic Complex	Abilene Christian (11)	115	St. Augustine's	71
2001; Details	Edwardsville, IL (SIU Edwardsville)	Ralph Korte Stadium	St. Augustine's (9)	80	Abilene Christian	59
2002; Details	San Angelo, TX (Angelo State)	Multi-Sports Complex	Abilene Christian (12)	91	St. Augustine's	88
2003; Details	Edwardsville, IL (SIU Edwardsville)	Ralph Korte Stadium	Abilene Christian (13)	102	St. Augustine's	69
2004; Details	Pomona, CA (Cal Poly Pomona)	Kellogg Field	Abilene Christian (14)	75	St. Augustine's	74
2005; Details	Abilene, TX (Abilene Christian)	Elmer J. Gray Stadium	Abilene Christian (15)	109	Adams State	84
2006; Details	Emporia, KS (Emporia State)	Francis G. Welch Stadium	Abilene Christian (16)	80	St. Augustine's	77½
2007; Details	Charlotte, NC (Johnson C. Smith)	Irwin Belk Complex	Abilene Christian (17)	105½	St. Augustine's	73
2008; Details	Pomona, CA (Cal Poly Pomona)	Kellogg Field	Abilene Christian (18)	108½	St. Augustine's	102
2009; Details	San Angelo, TX (Angelo State)	LeGrand Sports Complex	St. Augustine's (10)	94	Abilene Christian	86
2010; Details	Charlotte, NC (Johnson C. Smith)	Irwin Belk Complex	St. Augustine's (11)	82	Abilene Christian	62
2011; Details	Turlock, CA (Cal State Stanislaus)	Warrior Stadium	Abilene Christian (19)	68	Adams State	55
2012; Details	Pueblo, CO (CSU Pueblo)	ThunderBowl	Adams State	77	Lincoln (MO)	73
2013; Details	Pueblo, CO (CSU Pueblo)	ThunderBowl	Saint Augustine's (12)	105	Ashland	57
2014; Details	Allendale, MI (Grand Valley State)	GVSU Track and Field Complex	St. Augustine's (13)	112	Adams State †	67
2015; Details	Allendale, MI (Grand Valley State)	GVSU Track and Field Complex	St. Augustine's (14)	53	Findlay	50
2016; Details	Bradenton, FL (Tampa)	IMG Academy	St. Augustine's (15)	85	Texas A&M–Kingsville	36
2017; Details	Bradenton, FL (Tampa)	IMG Academy	St. Augustine's (16)	58	Lincoln (MO)	52
2018; Details	Charlotte, NC	Irwin Belk Track Complex	Texas A&M–Kingsville	65	Ashland	51
2019; Details	Kingsville, TX (Texas A&M–Kingsville)	Javelina Stadium	Ashland	54	Angelo State	53
2020	Cancelled due to the COVID-19 pandemic					
2021; Details	Allendale, MI (Grand Valley State)	GVSU Track and Field Complex	Grand Valley State	76	West Texas A&M	55
2022; Details	Allendale, MI (Grand Valley State)	GVSU Track and Field Complex	Pittsburg State	70	West Texas A&M	61
2023; Details	Pueblo, CO (CSU Pueblo)	ThunderBowl	Pittsburg State (2)	62	West Texas A&M	47
2024; Details	Emporia, KS (Emporia State)	Francis G. Welch Stadium	Pittsburg State (3)	78	West Texas A&M	64
2025; Details	Pueblo, CO (CSU Pueblo)	ThunderBowl	Pittsburg State (4)	111	West Texas A&M	66
2026; Details	Emporia, KS (Emporia State)	Francis G. Welch Stadium	Grand Valley State (2)	66	Pittsburg State	61

- † Participation vacated by NCAA Committee on Infractions

== Champions ==
=== Team titles ===
==== Active programs ====
Team	Titles	Years
St. Augustine's	16	1989, 1990, 1991, 1992, 1993, 1994, 1995, 1998, 2001, 2009, 2010, 2013, 2014, 2015, 2016, 2017
Pittsburg State	4	2022, 2023, 2024, 2025
Grand Valley State	2	2021, 2026
Ashland	1	2019
Texas A&M-Kingsville	1	2018
Adams State	1	2012
Cal State Los Angeles	1	1978
Cal State East Bay	1	1977
Kentucky State	1	1971

==== Former programs ====
Team	Titles	Years
Abilene Christian	19	1982, 1983, 1984, 1985, 1986, 1987, 1988, 1996, 1997, 1999, 2000, 2002, 2003, 2004, 2005, 2006, 2007, 2008, 2011
Cal Poly–San Luis Obispo	6	1968, 1969, 1970, 1979, 1980, 1981
Norfolk State	2	1973, 1974*
San Diego State	2	1965, 1966
UC Irvine	1	1976
Cal State Northridge	1	1975
Eastern Illinois	1	1974*
Eastern Michigan	1	1972
Long Beach State	1	1967
Fresno State	1	1964
UMES	1	1963

=== Individual titles ===
- Note: Top 10 only
- List updated through 2024.

Rank	Team	Titles
1	Abilene Christian	119
2	St. Augustine's	113
3	Cal Poly–San Luis Obispo	48
4	Adams State	36
5	Ashland	35
6	Angelo State	33
7	Lincoln (MO)	28
8	Texas A&M–Kingsville	25
9	Cal State Los Angeles	21
10	Central Missouri	20
10	Pittsburg State	20
10	Western Colorado	20

- Schools highlighted in italics have reclassified athletics from NCAA Division II.

== See also ==
- NCAA Men's Outdoor Track and Field Championship (Division I, Division III)
- NCAA Women's Outdoor Track and Field Championship (Division I, Division II, Division III)
- NCAA Men's Indoor Track and Field Championship (Division I, Division II, Division III)
- NCAA Women's Indoor Track and Field Championships (Division I, Division II, Division III)
- NAIA Men's Outdoor Track and Field Championship
- Pre-NCAA Outdoor Track and Field Champions
