= NCAA Division II women's outdoor track and field championships =

American collegiate track and field tournament

- Association: NCAA
- Sport: College track and field
- Founded: 1982; 44 years ago
- Division: Division II
- Country: United States; Canada
- Most recent champion: West Texas A&M (3rd)
- Most titles: Lincoln (MO) (9)
- Broadcaster: ESPNU
- Website: NCAA.com

The NCAA Division II women's Outdoor track and field championships are contested at an annual track meet hosted by the National Collegiate Athletic Association to determine the individual and team national champions of women's collegiate track and field among its Division II member institutions in the United States and Canada. It has been held every year since 1982.

Athletes' performances in individual championships earn points for their institutions and the team with the most points receives the NCAA team title in track and field.

The championships are held concurrently with the men's Division II outdoor championships but are separate from the NCAA Division II Women's Indoor Track and Field Championships held during the winter.

The most successful team have been Abilene Christian, with 10 titles.

The reigning team national champions are West Texas A&M, who won their third national title in 2026.

== Summary ==
NCAA Division II Women's Outdoor Track and Field Championships
Year	Site	Stadium	Championship Results			
Year	Site	Stadium	Winner	Points	Runners-Up	Points
1982; Details	Sacramento, CA (Sacramento State)	Hornet Stadium	Cal Poly SLO	259	Alabama A&M	144½
1983; Details	Cape Girardeau, MO (Southeast Missouri State)	Houck Stadium	Cal Poly SLO (2)	206	Morgan State	116
1984; Details	Cape Girardeau, MO (Southeast Missouri State)	Houck Stadium	Cal Poly SLO (3)	169½	Alabama A&M	139
1985; Details	Los Angeles, CA (Los Angeles State)	Jesse Owens Track	Abilene Christian	106	Cal Poly SLO	103
1986; Details	Los Angeles, CA (Los Angeles State)	Jesse Owens Track	Abilene Christian (2)	112	Cal Poly SLO	93½
1987; Details	Cape Girardeau, MO (Southeast Missouri State)	Houck Stadium	Abilene Christian (3)	166	Cal Poly SLO	114
1988; Details	San Angelo, TX (Angelo State)	Multi-Sports Complex	Abilene Christian (4)	109½	Alabama A&M	72
1989; Details	Hampton, VA (Hampton)	Armstrong Stadium	Cal Poly SLO (4)	103	Abilene Christian	70
1990; Details	Hampton, VA (Hampton)	Armstrong Stadium	Cal Poly SLO (5)	116	Norfolk State	72
1991; Details	San Angelo, TX (Angelo State)	Multi-Sports Complex	Cal Poly SLO (6)	72	Alabama A&M	71
1992; Details	San Angelo, TX (Angelo State)	Multi-Sports Complex	Alabama A&M	112	Cal State Los Angeles	65
1993; Details	Abilene, TX (Abilene Christian)	Elmer J. Gray Stadium	Alabama A&M (2)	92	Abilene Christian	86
1994; Details	Raleigh, NC (St. Augustine's)	George Williams Athletic Complex	Abilene Christian (5)	89½	Cal State Los Angeles †	72
1995; Details	Emporia, KS (Emporia State)	Francis G. Welch Stadium	Abilene Christian (6)	106	Cal State Los Angeles †	71
1996; Details	Riverside, CA (UC Riverside)	UC Riverside Track Facility	Abilene Christian (7)	136	St. Augustine's	86
1997; Details	Edwardsville, IL (SIU Edwardsville)	Ralph Korte Stadium	St. Augustine's	81	Abilene Christian	69
1998; Details	Edwardsville, IL (SIU Edwardsville)	Ralph Korte Stadium	Abilene Christian (8)	120	St. Augustine's	78
1999; Details	Emporia, KS (Emporia State)	Francis G. Welch Stadium	Abilene Christian (9)	145½	St. Augustine's	98
2000; Details	Raleigh, NC (Saint Augustine's)	George Williams Athletic Complex	St. Augustine's (2)	77	Abilene Christian	66
2001; Details	Edwardsville, IL (SIU Edwardsville)	Ralph Korte Stadium	St. Augustine's (3)	80	Western State	59
2002; Details	San Angelo, TX (Angelo State)	Multi-Sports Complex	St. Augustine's (4)	54	North Dakota State	53
2003; Details	Edwardsville, IL (SIU Edwardsville)	Ralph Korte Stadium	Lincoln (MO)	98	St. Augustine's	67
2004; Details	Pomona, CA (Cal Poly Pomona)	Kellogg Field	Lincoln (MO) (2)	85	Adams State	81
2005; Details	Abilene, TX (Abilene Christian)	Elmer J. Gray Stadium	Lincoln (MO) (3)	108	Cal State Bakersfield	53
2006; Details	Emporia, KS (Emporia State)	Francis G. Welch Stadium	Lincoln (MO) (4)	93	Abilene Christian	86
2007; Details	Charlotte, NC (Johnson C. Smith)	Irwin Belk Complex	Lincoln (MO) (5)	82½	Abilene Christian	69
2008; Details	Pomona, CA (Cal Poly Pomona)	Kellogg Field	Abilene Christian (10)	76½	Adams State	55
2009; Details	San Angelo, TX (Angelo State)	LeGrand Sports Complex	Lincoln (MO) (6)	85	Adams State	82
2010; Details	Charlotte, NC (Johnson C. Smith)	Irwin Belk Complex	Angelo State	87	Lincoln (MO)	73
2011; Details	Turlock, CA (Cal State Stanislaus)	Warrior Stadium	Grand Valley State	82½	Lincoln (MO)	68
2012; Details	Pueblo, CO (CSU Pueblo)	ThunderBowl	Grand Valley State (2)	90	Lincoln (MO)	79
2013; Details	Pueblo, CO (CSU Pueblo)	ThunderBowl	Academy of Art (CA)	60	Johnson C. Smith	54
2014; Details	Allendale, MI (Grand Valley State)	GVSU Track and Field Complex	Lincoln (MO) (7)	64	Johnson C. Smith	59
2015; Details	Allendale, MI (Grand Valley State)	GVSU Track and Field Complex	Central Missouri	59	Lincoln (MO)	50
2016; Details	Bradenton, FL (Tampa)	IMG Academy	Pittsburg State	52	St. Augustine's	51
2017; Details	Bradenton, FL (Tampa)	IMG Academy	West Texas A&M	64	Grand Valley State	44
2018; Details	Sioux Falls, SD (Sioux Falls)	Lillibridge Track	Lincoln (MO) (8)	60	Saint Augustine's	48.5
2019; Details	Kingsville, TX (Texas A&M–Kingsville)	Javelina Stadium	Lincoln (MO) (9)	64	Adams State	54
2020	Cancelled due to the COVID-19 pandemic					
2021; Details	Allendale, MI (Grand Valley State)	GVSU Track and Field Complex	Azusa Pacific	81	Grand Valley State	77
2022; Details	Allendale, MI (Grand Valley State)	GVSU Track and Field Complex	West Texas A&M (2)	77	Grand Valley State	64
2023; Details	Pueblo, CO (CSU Pueblo)	ThunderBowl	Azusa Pacific (2)	66	Minnesota State	57
2024; Details	Emporia, KS (Emporia State)	Francis G. Welch Stadium	Pittsburg State (2)	100	Adams State	72
2025; Details	Pueblo, CO (CSU Pueblo)	ThunderBowl	Grand Valley State (3)	60	Adams State	59
2026; Details	Emporia, KS (Emporia State)	Francis G. Welch Stadium	West Texas A&M (3)	64	Pittsburg State	63.2

- † Appearances vacated by the NCAA Committee on Infractions

=== Team titles ===
==== Active programs ====
Team	Titles	Years
Lincoln (MO)	9	2003, 2004, 2005, 2006, 2007, 2009, 2014, 2018, 2019
St. Augustine's	4	1997, 2000, 2001, 2002
Grand Valley State	3	2011, 2012, 2025
West Texas A&M	3	2017, 2022, 2026
Pittsburg State	2	2016, 2024
Azusa Pacific	2	2021, 2023
Central Missouri	1	2015
Academy of Art	1	2013
Angelo State	1	2010

==== Former programs ====
Team	Titles	Years
Abilene Christian	10	1985, 1986, 1987, 1988, 1994, 1995, 1996, 1998, 1999, 2008
Cal Poly San Luis Obispo	6	1982, 1983, 1984, 1989, 1990, 1991
Alabama A&M	2	1992, 1993

=== Individual titles ===
Rank	Team	Titles
1	Abilene Christian	74
2	Lincoln (MO)	61
3	St. Augustine's	47
4	Adams State	38
5	Cal Poly San Luis Obispo	35
6	Alabama A&M	33
7	Western Colorado	25
7	Grand Valley State	25
9	Seattle Pacific	19
10	Cal State Los Angeles	18

- Schools highlighted in italics have reclassified athletics from NCAA Division II.

== See also ==
- NCAA Women's Outdoor Track and Field Championship (Division I, Division III)
- NCAA Men's Outdoor Track and Field Championship (Division I, Division II, Division III)
- NCAA Women's Indoor Track and Field Championships (Division I, Division II, Division III)
- NCAA Men's Indoor Track and Field Championship (Division I, Division II, Division III)
- AIAW Intercollegiate Women's Outdoor Track and Field Champions
- NAIA Women's Outdoor Track and Field Championship
- Pre-NCAA Outdoor Track and Field Champions
