= Marcus Newsom =

Current position
- Title: Head coach
- Team: Wartburg
- Conference: ARC

Biographical details
- Born: Kansas City, Kansas, U.S.
- Education: Bethany College (Kansas)

Coaching career (HC unless noted)
- 1993–1994: Bethany College (Kansas) (asst.)
- 1994–1995: MidAmerica Nazarene (asst.)
- 1995–1998: Wartburg (asst.)
- 1998–present: Wartburg (track and field)

Accomplishments and honors

Championships
- 5x NCAA Women's Outdoor (2005, 2009, 2012–2015); 3x NCAA Women's Indoor (2009, 2010, 2012); 2021 NCAA Men's Outdoor; 21x IIAC/ARC Women's Outdoor (2000–2017, 2019, 2024); 17x IIAC/ARC Women's Indoor (2003–2016, 2018, 2020–2021, 2025); 13x IIAC/ARC Men's Outdoor (1999, 2002–2003, 2006–2008, 2013–2014, 2017, 2019, 2021, 2023, 2025); 12x IIAC/ARC Men's Indoor (2003–2006, 2008–2009, 2012, 2014–2015, 2019, 2021, 2025)

Awards
- 6x USTFCCCA Women's Outdoor National Coach of the Year (2004, 2005, 2007, 2009, 2010, 2012); 6x USTFCCCA Indoor Women's National Coach of the Year (2004, 2005, 2007, 2009, 2010, 2012); 4x USTFCCCA Outdoor Men's National Coach of the Year (2009, 2012, 2014, 2021)

Marcus Newsom is the current men's and women's track and field coach at Wartburg College in Waverly, Iowa. Newsom came to Wartburg in 1995 as an assistant coach and was elevated to head coach in 1998. Since his arrival, he has coached over 600 All-Americans, 64 team conference titles and 9 team National Champions.

== Wartburg College ==
Newsom was named head coach in 1998. He led the Knights to their first NCAA National Championship in track in field in the schools' history in 2005, winning the Women's outdoor national title. His first national title came at home in Walston-Hoover Stadium. In 2009, Newsom would take the program to new heights when he won his first women's indoor title and then sweep the year by winning the 2009 women's outdoor national title. 2012 would be the best year in Newsom's career as they would win the women's indoor NCAA title with a meet record 99 points and the women's outdoor NCAA title with 129 points, with a 77-point margin of victory over 2nd place, another meet record. He would go on to win 3 straight outdoor national titles from 2012 to 2014, with 5 total women's outdoor NCAA titles. In 2021, Newsom would win his first and the college's first national title in men's track and field. He would lead the Knights to the 2021 outdoor men's track and field title with 51 points.

== Yearly results ==
=== Women's record ===
Season	NCAA		Conference	
Season	Indoor	Outdoor	Indoor	Outdoor
American Rivers Conference
1999	T-21st (6)	8th(24)	1st (161)	2nd (178)
2000	T-39th (1)	T-11th(20)	-	1st
2001	-	9th(21)	-	1st
2002	6th (21)	6th(32)	-	1st (229)
2003	6th (22)	9th(26)	1st (217)	1st (222.5)
2004	T-29th (6)	4th(35)	1st (219)	1st (239)
2005	2nd (32)	1st(43)	1st (191.5)	1st (224)
2006	16th (12)	T-19th(14)	1st (241)	1st (242)
2007	T-14th (12)	7th(31)	1st (262)	1st (267)
2008	2nd (27)	3rd(34)	1st (259)	1st (279.5)
2009	1st (51)	1st(52)	1st (276)	1st (243)
2010	1st (33)	4th(36)	1st (242)	1st (241)
2011	2nd (44)	2nd(59)	1st (251)	1st (279)
2012	1st (99)	1st(129)	1st (317)	1st (353)
2013	4th (25)	1st(46)	1st (262)	1st (286)
2014	3rd (46)	1st(65)	1st (282)	1st (281.5)
2015	T-14th (14)	T-15th(15)	1st (220)	1st (257.5)
2016	T-35th (6)	T-14th(15)	1st (216)	1st (243)
2017	T-21st (10)	T-17th(14)	2nd (183.33)	1st (212.5)
2018	T-35th (6)	T-9th(24)	1st (212.5)	2nd (188)
2019	T-35th (6)	T-14th(24)	2nd (212.5)	1st (188)
2020	—	—	1st (211)	—
2021	T-35th (6)	T-14th(15)	1st (212.5)	2nd (184)
2022	T-35th (6)	T-14th(15)	2nd (188)	1st (231)
2023	9th (23)	6th(29)	2nd (207)	2nd (218)
2024	8th (24)	5th(26)	2nd (178.5)	1st (234.5)
2025	36th (6)	10th(21)	2nd (191.5)	1st (245)
Total	3	5	ARC: 17	ARC: 22

Note: The 2020 season was canceled after ARC Indoor Championships due to the Coronavirus Pandemic, the ARC Outdoor and NCAA Championships were not held.

== Personal life ==
Newsom grew up in Kansas City, Kansas and would go on to play football and run track at Bethany College in Lindsborg, Kansas.

== See also ==
- Wartburg Knights track and field
