= NCAA Division III men's outdoor track and field championships =

American collegiate track and field tournament

- Association: NCAA
- Sport: College outdoor track and field
- Founded: 1974; 52 years ago
- Division: Division III
- No. of teams: 84
- Country: United States
- Most recent champion: Wisconsin–La Crosse
- Most titles: Wisconsin–La Crosse (18)
- Broadcaster: ESPNU
- Website: NCAA.com

The NCAA Division III men's outdoor track and field championships are contested at the annual track meet hosted by the National Collegiate Athletic Association to determine the team and individual national champions of men's collegiate outdoor track and field among its Division III members in the United States. It has been held annually since 1974.

Athletes' individual performances earn points for their institution and individual national titles while the team with the most points receives the NCAA team title for outdoor track and field.

Wisconsin–La Crosse have been the most successful program, with eighteen national titles.

Wisconsin–La Crosse are also the reigning national champions, winning their eighteenth national title in 2026.

== Events ==
=== Track events ===
- Sprint events
  - 100 meter dash
  - 200 meter dash
  - 400 meter dash
- Distance events
  - 800 meter run
  - 1500 meter run
  - 3000 meter steeplechase
  - 5000 meter run
  - 10,000 meter run
- Hurdle Events
  - 110 meter hurdles
  - 400 meter intermediate hurdles
- Relay events
  - 400 meter relay
  - 1600 meter relay

=== Field events ===
- Jumping events
  - High jump
  - Pole vault
  - Long jump
  - Triple jump
- Throwing events
  - Shot put
  - Discus throw
  - Hammer throw
  - Javelin throw
- Multi-events
  - Decathlon

=== Discontinued events ===
- Sprint events
  - 100 yard dash
  - 220 yard dash
  - 440 yard dash
  - 880 yard dash
- Distance events
  - Mile run
  - Three-mile run
  - Six-mile run
- Hurdle events
  - 120 yard high hurdles
  - 440 yard intermediate hurdles
- Relay events
  - 440 yard relay
  - Mile relay

== Results ==
=== Scoring ===
- 1974–1981: the top 6 finishers scored for their team, with points being awarded 10, 8, 6, 4, 2, 1
- 1982–1984: the top 12 finishers scored for their team with points being awarded 15, 12, 10, 9, 8, 7, 6, 5, 4, 3, 2, 1.
- 1985–present: the top 8 finishers scored, with points awarded 10, 8, 6, 5, 4, 3, 2, 1. In the place of a tie of two or more people the total points for those accumulated places are added up and divided by the number of people.

=== Team Champions ===
NCAA Division III Men's Outdoor Track and Field Championships
Year	Site	Championship Results			
Year	Site	Winner	Points	Runners-up	Points
1974; Details	Charleston, IL (Eastern Illinois)	Ashland	61	Southern–New Orleans	48
1975; Details	Berea, OH (Baldwin Wallace)	Southern–New Orleans	66	Augustana (IL)	34
1976; Details	Chicago, IL (Chicago)	Southern–New Orleans (2)	46	Brandeis	44
1977; Details	Grand Rapids, MI (Calvin)	Southern–New Orleans (3)	50	Occidental	47
1978; Details	Grand Rapids, MI (Calvin)	Occidental	45	Glassboro State	35
1979; Details	Berea, OH (Baldwin Wallace)	Slippery Rock	48	Glassboro State	44
1980; Details	Naperville, IL (North Central)	Glassboro State	61	Stanislaus State	56
1981; Details	Cleveland, OH (Case)	Glassboro State (2)	58	Augustana (IL)	42
1982; Details	Naperville, IL (North Central)	Glassboro State (3)	119	Hamline	111½
1983; Details	Naperville, IL (North Central)	Glassboro State (4)	97	Hamline	94
1984; Details	Northfield, MN (Carleton)	Glassboro State (5)	114	Mount Union	100
1985; Details	Granville, OH (Denison)	Lincoln (PA)	61	Wisconsin–La Crosse	58
1986; Details	La Crosse, WI (UW–La Crosse)	Frostburg State	61	Lincoln (PA); Wisconsin–La Crosse	58
1987; Details	Naperville, IL (North Central)	Frostburg State (2)	66	Lincoln (PA)	56
1988; Details	Northfield, MN (Carleton)	Wisconsin–La Crosse	54	Lincoln (PA)	47
1989; Details	Naperville, IL (North Central)	North Central (IL)	66	Lincoln (PA)	58
1990; Details	Naperville, IL (North Central)	Lincoln (PA) (2)	49	Wisconsin–Oshkosh	45
1991; Details	Berea, OH (Baldwin Wallace)	Wisconsin–La Crosse (2)	73	Lincoln (PA)	64
1992; Details	Waterville, ME (Colby)	Wisconsin–La Crosse (3)	73½	Lincoln (PA)	51½
1993; Details	Berea, OH (Baldwin Wallace)	Wisconsin–La Crosse (4)	97	Lincoln (PA)	76
1994; Details	Naperville, IL (North Central)	North Central (IL) (2)	75	Wisconsin–La Crosse	74
1995; Details	Northfield, MN (Carleton)	Lincoln (PA) (3)	80	Williams	61
1996; Details	Naperville, IL (North Central)	Lincoln (PA) (4)	61	Williams	59
1997; Details	La Crosse, WI (UW–La Crosse)	Wisconsin–La Crosse (5)	69½	Lincoln (PA)	58⅓
1998; Details	St. Paul, MN (Macalester)	North Central (IL) (3)	91	Lincoln (PA)	73
1999; Details	Berea, OH (Baldwin Wallace)	Lincoln (PA) (5)	62	Pacific Lutheran	47
2000; Details	Naperville, IL (North Central)	Lincoln (PA) (6); North Central (IL) (4)	52	Central (IA)	38
2001; Details	Decatur, IL (Millikin)	Wisconsin–La Crosse (6)	80	Lincoln (PA)	60
2002; Details	St. Paul, MN (Macalester)	Wisconsin–La Crosse (7)	64	Calvin	41
2003; Details	Canton, NY (St. Lawrence)	Wisconsin–La Crosse (8)	88	Lincoln (PA)	64
2004; Details	Decatur, IL (Millikin)	Wisconsin–La Crosse (9)	88	Nebraska Wesleyan	64
2005; Details	Waverly, IA (Wartburg)	Lincoln (PA) (7)	70	Wisconsin–La Crosse	67½
2006; Details	Lisle, IL (Benedictine)	Wisconsin–La Crosse (10)	74½	Lincoln (PA)	54
2007; Details	Oshkosh, WI (UW–Oshkosh)	Wisconsin–La Crosse (11)	99	SUNY Cortland	34
2008; Details	Oshkosh, WI (UW–Oshkosh)	McMurry	35	SUNY Cortland	33
2009; Details	Marietta, OH (Marietta)	Wisconsin–Oshkosh	46	McMurry	40
2010; Details	Berea, OH (Baldwin Wallace)	North Central (IL) (5)	53	Salisbury	36
2011; Details	Delaware, OH (Ohio Wesleyan)	North Central (IL) (6)	58	Wisconsin–La Crosse	56
2012; Details	Claremont, CA (Claremont–MS)	McMurry (2)	66	Wisconsin–La Crosse	47
2013; Details	La Crosse, WI (UW–La Crosse)	Wisconsin–La Crosse (12)	66	Wisconsin–Eau Claire	64
2014; Details	Delaware, OH (Ohio Wesleyan)	Mount Union	47	Wisconsin–La Crosse	42
2015; Details	Canton, NY (St. Lawrence University)	Wisconsin–La Crosse (13)	71	Wisconsin–Eau Claire	46
2016; Details	Waverly, Iowa (Wartburg College)	Wisconsin–La Crosse (14)	41	Wisconsin–Eau Claire	33
2017; Details	Geneva, OH; The Spire Institute	Wisconsin–La Crosse (15)	47	UW Whitewater	45
2018; Details	La Crosse, WI (UW La Crosse)	Mount Union (2)	36	North Central (IL)	35
2019; Details	Geneva, OH (NCAC)	Wisconsin–Eau Claire	68	MIT	38
2020	Cancelled due to the COVID-19 pandemic				
2021; Details	Greensboro, NC	Wartburg	54	Wisconsin–Eau Claire	49
2022; Details	Geneva, OH (NCAC)	Wisconsin–Eau Claire (2)	73	John Carroll	48
2023; Details	Rochester, NY (St. John Fisher)	MIT	60.5	Wisconsin–La Crosse	49
2024; Details	Myrtle Beach, SC (Coastal Carolina)	Wisconsin–La Crosse (16)	76	Wisconsin–Oshkosh	48
2025; Details	Geneva, OH (NCAC)	Wisconsin–La Crosse (17)	84	Wisconsin–Eau Claire	56
2026; Details	La Crosse, WI (UW–La Crosse)	Wisconsin–La Crosse (18)	106	Rowan	85

== Champions ==
=== Team titles ===
==== Active programs ====
Team	Titles	Years
Wisconsin–La Crosse	18	1988, 1991, 1992, 1993, 1997, 2001, 2002, 2003, 2004, 2006, 2007, 2013, 2015, 2016, 2017, 2024, 2025, 2026
North Central (IL)	6	1989, 1994, 1998, 2000*, 2010, 2011
Rowan (Glassboro State)	5	1980, 1981, 1982, 1983, 1984
Wisconsin–Eau Claire	2	2019, 2022
Mount Union	2	2014, 2018
McMurry	2	2008, 2012
MIT	1	2023
Wartburg	1	2021
Wisconsin–Oshkosh	1	2009
Occidental	1	1978

==== Former programs ====
Team	Titles	Years
Lincoln (PA)	7	1985, 1990, 1995, 1996, 1999, 2000*, 2005
Southern–New Orleans	3	1975, 1976, 1977
Frostburg State	2	1986, 1987
Ashland	1	1974
Slippery Rock	1	1979

=== Individual titles ===
- List updated through the 2024 Championships

Rank	Team	Titles
1	Wisconsin–La Crosse	65
2	Lincoln (PA)	57
3	North Central (IL)	39
4	Mount Union	36
5	Rowan (Glassboro State)	29
6	Wisconsin–Oshkosh	21
7	Southern–New Orleans	19
7	St. Thomas (MN)	19
7	Wisconsin–Whitewater	19
10	Augustana (IL)	17
10	Pomona–Pitzer	17

- Schools highlighted in italics have reclassified athletics from NCAA Division III.

== Championship Meet Records ==
Event	Record	Athlete	University	Date	Meet	Ref.
Track events
100 m	10.13 (+1.9 m/s)	Sam Blaskowski	UW-La Crosse	27 May 2023	2023 Championships	
200 m	20.25 (+1.6 m/s)	Cheickna Traore	Ramapo	27 May 2023	2023 Championships	
400 m	45.29	Andrew Rock	UW-La Crosse	24 May 2003	2003 Championships	
800 m	1:47.39	Trevor Richwine	Dickinson	23 May 2026	2026 Championships	
1500 m	3:44.29	Ryan Hagan	SUNY Geneseo	23 May 2026	2026 Championships	
5000 m	13:55.0	Dan Henderson	Wheaton (IL)	26 May 1979	1979 Championships	
10,000 m	28:37.89	Alex Phillip	John Carroll	25 May 2023	2023 Championships	
110 m hurdles	13.42 (+2.0 m/s)	Luke Schroeder	UW-La Crosse	23 May 2026	2026 Championships	
400 m hurdles	49.59	Edwin Moses	Morehouse	27 May 1977	1977 Championships	
3000 m steeplechase	8:39.22	Joey Sullivan	UW-La Crosse	22 May 2026	2026 Championships	
4 × 100 m relay	39.25	Davian Willems; Dylan Doss; Londyn Little; Nolan Milas	UW-Oshkosh	23 May 2026	2026 Championships	
4 × 400 m relay	3:06.52	Jacob Parent; Josh Thomsen; Victor Lelinga; Grant Nelson	Bethel (MN)	24 May 2025	2025 Championships	
Field events
High jump	2.20 m (7-2.5)	Raheim Greenridge	Wheaton (MA)	27 May 2000	2000 Championships	
Pole vault	5.45 m (17-10.5)	Luke Winder	North Central (IL)	27 May 2017	2017 Championships	
Long jump	7.95 m (26-1)	Joshua Rivers	UW-Oshkosh	23 May 2024	2024 Championships	
Triple jump	17.68 m (54-4¾)	Jan Cado	North Central (IL)	27 May 1989	1989 Championships	
Shot put	19.56 m (64-2¼)	Mike Manders	Hamline	28 May 1983	1983 Championships	
Discus throw	60.38 m (198-1)	Carter Comito	Whitworth	25 May 2013	2013 Championships	
Hammer throw	66.35 m (217-8)	Eric Flores	Cal Lutheran	27 May 2010	2010 Championships	
Javelin throw	75.55 m (247 ft 10 1/4 in)	Tim Vanliew	Rutgers-Camden	25 May 2013	2013 Championships	
Decathlon	7528 pts	Kip Janvrin	Simpson (Iowa)	23 May 1987	1987 Championships	

== See also ==
- NCAA Men's Outdoor Track and Field Championship (Division I, Division II)
- NCAA Women's Outdoor Track and Field Championship (Division I, Division II, Division III)
- NCAA Men's Indoor Track and Field Championship (Division I, Division II, Division III)
- NCAA Women's Indoor Track and Field Championships (Division I, Division II, Division III)
- NAIA Men's Outdoor Track and Field Championship
- Pre-NCAA Outdoor Track and Field Champions
