= Walston-Hoover Stadium =

Athletic facility at Wartburg College

Walston–Hoover Stadium

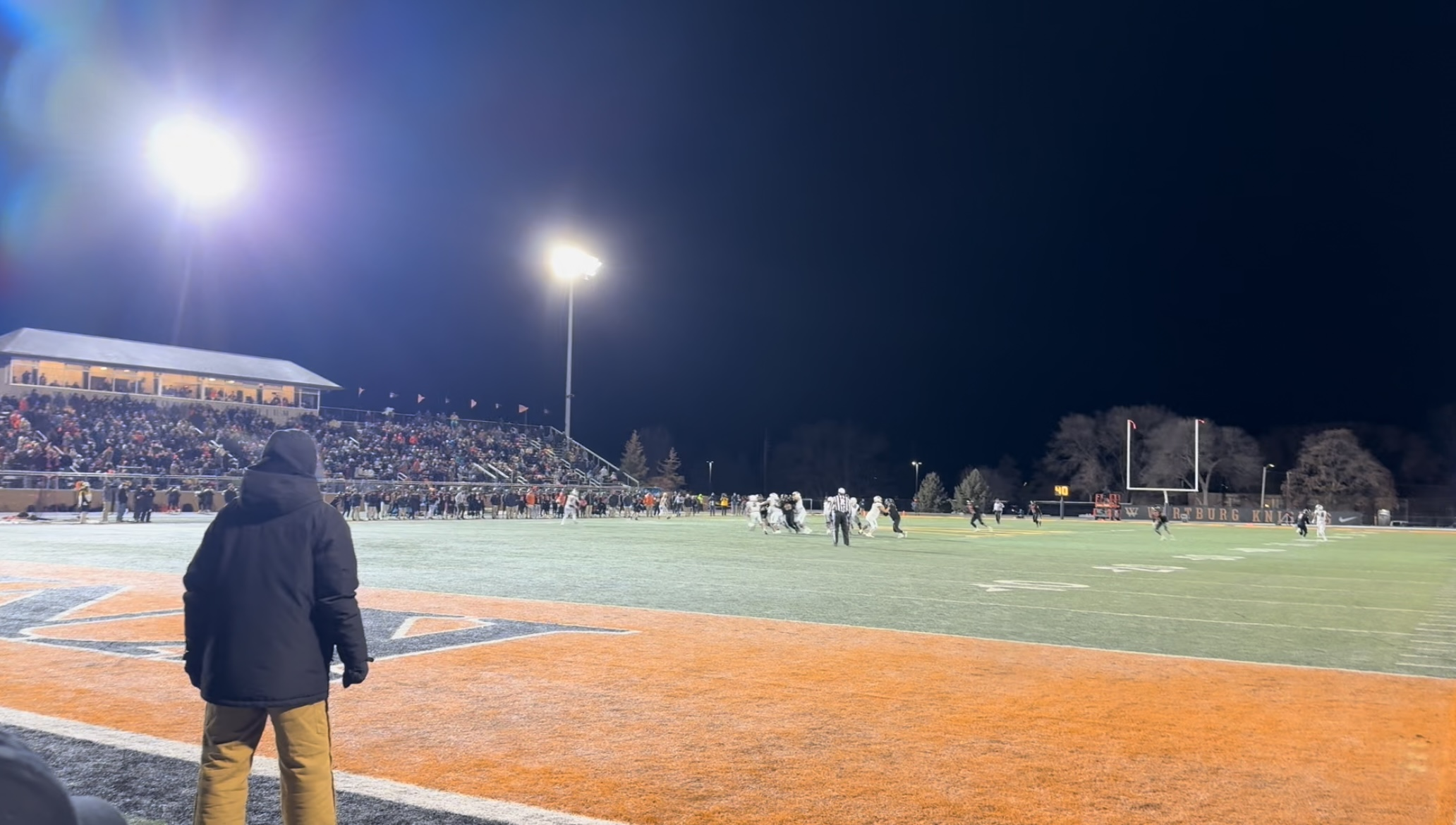
- Walston-Hoover stadium during the NCAA DIII football semifinals in December of 2023
- Interactive map of Walston–Hoover Stadium
- Address: Waverly, IA; United States
- Coordinates: 42.7296°N 92.4844°W
- Owner: Wartburg College
- Capacity: 5,000
- Type: Stadium
- Surface: FieldTurf (2001–present)
- Record attendance: 6,500
- Current use: Football; Track and field

Construction
- Opened: September 1, 2001; 24 years ago
- Cost: 3.7 Million

Tenants
- Wartburg Knights (NCAA) teams: football (2001–present); track and field (2001–present)

Website
- go-knights.net/walston-hoover-stadium

Walston–Hoover Stadium, formerly Schield Stadium, is a stadium in Waverly, Iowa. It is primarily used for American football, and track and field and has a seating capacity of 5,000. The stadium has hosted two NCAA track and field National Championships and multiple NCAA DIII football playoff games, including an NCAA Semifinal in 2023, telecast on ESPN.

== History ==
Wartburg College broke ground on a new football stadium and track and field facility for the 2001 academic year. Formerly Schield stadium, the new facility was named Walston-Hoover Stadium, named after longtime residents and supporters of the Knights. The new stadium saw upgrades in home and visitor bleachers, lighting, scoreboard, field turf and all-weather track. The new track allowed Wartburg to now host outdoor track and field meets, something they could not do prior to the renovation due to their old cinder track.

On September 1, 2001, the stadium opened for the first time to the public with a football game against Wisconsin-Oshkosh. The game would be the first night game hosted by Wartburg in school history, the Knights came away with a 31–10 victory.

The stadium attendance record was set on Saturday October 20, 2007 in a football game against Coe College. The homecoming game was a standing room only crowd of 6,500, which saw a 27-3 Wartburg win.

== Events ==
Walston-Hoover has been the host to two NCAA Division III men's and women's outdoor track and field championships. The first was hosted in 2005, where the host Wartburg Knights women's track and field team would come away with their first NCAA outdoor championship. Lincoln University would win their 7th NCAA title on the men's side. In 2016 the stadium would host for a second time. Wisconsin–La Crosse Eagles would go on to win the men's title for the 14th time, while Illinois Wesleyan would come away with their 3rd outdoor title.
