= Wisconsin–Oshkosh Titans =

- University: University of Wisconsin–Oshkosh
- Nickname: Titans
- NCAA: Division III
- Conference: WIAC
- Location: Oshkosh, Wisconsin, U.S.
- Football stadium: Titan Stadium
- Basketball arena: Kolf Sports Center
- Colors: Black and yellow
- Mascot: Clash
- Website: www.uwoshkoshtitans.com
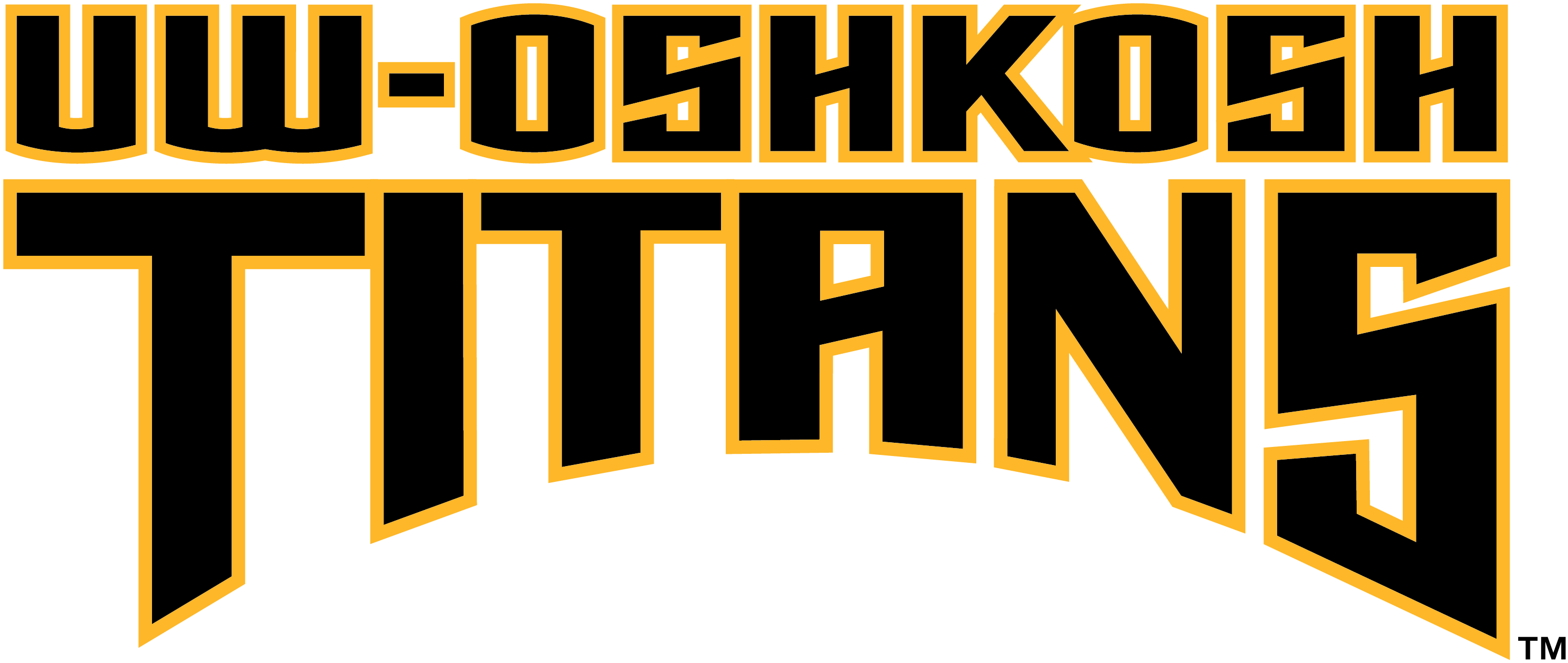

Team NCAA championships
- 36

The University of Wisconsin–Oshkosh Titans (casually known as the UW-Oshkosh Titans) are the athletic teams of the University of Wisconsin–Oshkosh. The Titans athletic teams compete in NCAA Division III.

== Varsity teams ==
Men's sports	Women's sports
Baseball	Basketball
Basketball	Cross country
Cross country	Flag football
Football	Golf
Soccer (2027–28)	Gymnastics
Swimming and diving	Soccer
Track and field	Softball
Wrestling	Swimming and diving
	Tennis
	Track and field
	Volleyball
	Wrestling

== NCAA National championships ==
=== Team ===
Sport	Titles	Assoc.	Division	Year	Opponent	Score
Baseball	2	NCAA	Division III	1985	Marietta	11–6
Baseball	2	NCAA	Division III	1994	Wesleyan (CT)	6–2
Basketball (men's)	1	NCAA	Division III	2019	Swarthmore	96-82
Basketball (women's)	1	NCAA	Division III	1996	Mount Union	66–50
Cross country (men's)	4	NCAA	Division III	1988	North Central (IL)	66–75
Cross country (men's)	4	NCAA	Division III	1989	North Central (IL)	55–118
Cross country (men's)	4	NCAA	Division III	1990	North Central (IL)	87–100
Cross country (men's)	4	NCAA	Division III	2002	Calvin	66–122
Cross country (women's)	4	NCAA	Division III	1987	Ithaca	81–85
Cross country (women's)	4	NCAA	Division III	1988	St. Thomas (MN)	69–73
Cross country (women's)	4	NCAA	Division III	1991	Cortland	98–103
Cross country (women's)	4	NCAA	Division III	1996	St. Thomas (MN)	62–113
Gymnastics (men's)	3	NCAA	Division II	1980	Chico State	260.55-250.05
Gymnastics (men's)	3	NCAA	Division II	1981	Springfield (MA)	209.5-201.55
Gymnastics (men's)	3	NCAA	Division II	1982	East Stroudsburg	216.09-211.2
Track and field (men's) (indoor)	1	NCAA	Division III	2009*	Whitworth	32–24
Track and field (men's) (outdoor)	1	NCAA	Division III	2009	McMurry	46-40
Track and field (women's) (indoor)	9	NCAA	Division III	1994	Christopher Newport	41–36
Track and field (women's) (indoor)	9	NCAA	Division III	1995	Cortland	42–26
Track and field (women's) (indoor)	9	NCAA	Division III	1996	Lincoln (PA)	41–29
Track and field (women's) (indoor)	9	NCAA	Division III	2004	Wheaton (MA)	56.5–28
Track and field (women's) (indoor)	9	NCAA	Division III	2005	Wartburg	36–32
Track and field (women's) (indoor)	9	NCAA	Division III	2006	Williams	44–38
Track and field (women's) (indoor)	9	NCAA	Division III	2011	Wartburg	46.5–44
Track and field (women's) (indoor)	9	NCAA	Division III	2013	Illinois College	56–32
Track and field (women's) (indoor)	9	NCAA	Division III	2014	Wisconsin–La Crosse	67–65
Track and field (women's) (outdoor)	9	NCAA	Division III	1990	Cortland	75–48
Track and field (women's) (outdoor)	9	NCAA	Division III	1991	Cortland	66.5–56
Track and field (women's) (outdoor)	9	NCAA	Division III	1995	St. Thomas (MN)	58–52
Track and field (women's) (outdoor)	9	NCAA	Division III	1996	Lincoln (PA)	69.5–62
Track and field (women's) (outdoor)	9	NCAA	Division III	1997	Wisconsin–La Crosse	59–38.75
Track and field (women's) (outdoor)	9	NCAA	Division III	2004	Calvin	57–42.25
Track and field (women's) (outdoor)	9	NCAA	Division III	2006	Williams	52–42
Track and field (women's) (outdoor)	9	NCAA	Division III	2007	Calvin	57–44.5
Track and field (women's) (outdoor)	9	NCAA	Division III	2011	Wartburg	80–59
Volleyball	1	NCAA	Division III	2025	La Verne	3–0

- Asterisk indicates shared national championship

== Notable alumni ==
- Marty Below, member of the College Football Hall of Fame
- Doe Boyland, former Major League Baseball (Pittsburgh Pirates) first baseman
- Ron Cardo, former head football coach at UW-Oshkosh
- Pahl Davis, American football player
- Claire Decker, NASCAR driver
- Norm DeBriyn (1963), former head baseball coach at the University of Arkansas
- Jim Gantner (attended until 1974), former Major League Baseball (Milwaukee Brewers) second baseman
- Terry Jorgensen, former Major League Baseball (Minnesota Twins) outfielder
- Tim Jorgensen, former Minor League Baseball shortstop
- Rube Lautenschlager, former National Basketball League (United States) basketball player
- Lester Leitl, football coach
- Jim Magnuson, former Major League Baseball (New York Yankees, Chicago White Sox) pitcher
- Dan Neumeier, former Major League Baseball (Chicago White Sox) pitcher
- Allison Pottinger, curler
- Hal Robl, NFL player
- Eric Schafer, professional MMA fighter
- Eber Simpson, NFL player
- Jack Taschner, former Major League Baseball (San Francisco Giants, Philadelphia Phillies, Pittsburgh Pirates, Los Angeles Dodgers) relief pitcher
- John Thome, Football coach
- Gary Varsho (attended until 1982), former Major League Baseball ( Chicago Cubs, Pittsburgh Pirates, Cincinnati Reds, Philadelphia Phillies) outfielder and coach
- Jarrod Washburn (attended until 1995), former Major League Baseball (Los Angeles Angels, Seattle Mariners, Detroit Tigers) pitcher
- Milt Wilson, professional football player
