= NCAA Division II women's indoor track and field championships =

American collegiate track and field tournament

- Association: NCAA
- Sport: College indoor track and field
- Founded: 1985; 41 years ago
- Division: Division II
- Country: United States; Canada
- Most recent champion: Pittsburg State
- Most titles: Abilene Christian (12)
- Broadcaster: ESPNU
- Website: NCAA.com

The NCAA Division II women's indoor track and field championships are contested at an annual meet organized by the National Collegiate Athletic Association to determine the individual and team national champions of women's collegiate indoor track and field among its Division II members in the United States and Canada. The event has been held every year since 1983.

These events are separate from the Division II women's outdoor championships held during the spring

The most successful program has been Abilene Christian, who won 12 team national titles before departing for Division I.

== Format ==
Athletes' performances in individual championships earn points for their institutions and the team with the most points receives the NCAA team title in track and field. A separate NCAA Division II men's competition is also held.

=== Track events ===
- Sprint events
  - 60 meter dash
  - 200 meter dash
  - 400 meter dash
- Distance events
  - 800 meter run
  - Mile run
  - 3,000 meter run
  - 5,000 meter run
- Hurdle Events
  - 60 meter high hurdles
- Relay events
  - 1,600 meter relay
  - Distance medley relay

=== Field events ===
- Jumping events
  - High jump
  - Pole vault
  - Long jump
  - Triple jump
- Throwing events
  - Shot put
  - Weight throw
- Multi-events
  - Pentathlon

== Summary ==
NCAA Division II women's indoor track and field championships
Year	Site (Host)	Stadium/Arena	Championship Results			
Year	Site (Host)	Stadium/Arena	Winner	Points	Runners-up	Points
1985; Details	Fargo, ND (North Dakota State)	–	St. Augustine's	77	NYIT	40
1986	Not held					
1987; Details	Fargo, ND (North Dakota State)	–	St. Augustine's (2)	73	Hampton	62
1988; Details	Vermillion, SD (South Dakota)	Dakota Dome	Abilene Christian	91	Hampton	51
1989; Details	Vermillion, SD (South Dakota)	Dakota Dome	Abilene Christian (2)	69	Southeast Missouri State	48
1990; Details	Vermillion, SD (South Dakota)	Dakota Dome	Abilene Christian (3)	60	Norfolk State	41
1991; Details	Vermillion, SD (South Dakota)	Dakota Dome	Abilene Christian (4)	72	St. Augustine's	28
1992; Details	Bay City, MI (Saginaw Valley State)	SVSU Fieldhouse	Alabama A&M	67	Abilene Christian; Cal State Los Angeles	42
1993; Details	Vermillion, SD (South Dakota)	Dakota Dome	Abilene Christian (5)	57½	Norfolk State	33
1994; Details	Fargo, ND (North Dakota State)	–	Abilene Christian (6)	78	Norfolk State	42
1995; Details	Indianapolis, IN (Indianapolis)	RCA Dome	Abilene Christian (7)	70	Adams State	38
1996; Details	Indianapolis, IN (Indianapolis)	RCA Dome	Abilene Christian (8)	68	St. Augustine's	40
1997; Details	Indianapolis, IN (Indianapolis)	RCA Dome	Abilene Christian (9)	76	St. Augustine's	61
1998; Details	Indianapolis, IN (Indianapolis)	RCA Dome	Abilene Christian (10)	66	South Dakota	43
1999; Details	Indianapolis, IN (Indianapolis)	RCA Dome	Abilene Christian (11)	119	St. Augustine's	44
2000; Details	Boston, MA	Reggie Lewis Track	Abilene Christian (12)	48	North Dakota State	47
2001; Details	Boston, MA	Reggie Lewis Track	St. Augustine's (3)	63	Abilene Christian	48
2002; Details	Boston, MA	Reggie Lewis Track	North Dakota State	67½	St. Augustine's	45
2003; Details	Boston, MA	Reggie Lewis Track	St. Augustine's (4)	73	St. Augustine's	53
2004; Details	Boston, MA	Reggie Lewis Track	Lincoln (MO)	62	Adams State	58
2005; Details	Boston, MA	Reggie Lewis Track	St. Augustine's (5)	53	Abilene Christian	48½
2006; Details	Boston, MA	Reggie Lewis Track	Lincoln (MO) (2)	87	Abilene Christian	50⅓
2007; Details	Boston, MA	Reggie Lewis Track	St. Augustine's (6)	105	Lincoln (MO)	64
2008; Details	Mankato, MN (Minnesota State)	Myers Fieldhouse	Adams State	55	St. Augustine's	48
2009; Details	Houston, TX	Yeoman Field House	Lincoln (MO) (3)	100½	Grand Valley State	48
2010; Details	Albuquerque, NM	Albuquerque Convention Center	Lincoln (MO) (4)	56	Ashland; Grand Valley State	47
2011; Details	Albuquerque, NM	Albuquerque Convention Center	Grand Valley State	83	Lincoln (MO)	51
2012; Details	Mankato, MN (Minnesota State)	Myers Fieldhouse	Grand Valley State (2)	94	Adams State	51
2013; Details	Birmingham, AL	Birmingham CrossPlex	Academy of Art	59	Lincoln (MO)	48½
2014; Details	Winston-Salem, NC	JDL Fast Track	Adams State (2)	67	Johnson C. Smith	59
2015; Details	Birmingham, AL	Birmingham CrossPlex	Central Missouri	47	Hillsdale	40
2016; Details	Pittsburg, KS	Robert W. Plaster Center	Lincoln (MO) (5)	60	Hillsdale	58
2017; Details	Birmingham, AL	Birmingham CrossPlex	Adams State (3)	47	Grand Valley State	39
2018; Details	Pittsburg, KS	Robert W. Plaster Center	West Texas A&M	53	Lincoln (MO)	36
2019; Details	Pittsburg, KS	Robert W. Plaster Center	Adams State (4)	87	Grand Valley State	64
2020	Cancelled due to the COVID-19 pandemic in the United States					
2021; Details	Birmingham, AL	Birmingham CrossPlex	Grand Valley State (3)	93	Minnesota State	40
2022; Details	Pittsburg, KS (Pittsburg State)	Robert W. Plaster Center	Minnesota State	58	Grand Valley State	51
2023; Details	Virginia Beach, VA (Norfolk State)	Virginia Beach Sports Center	Adams State (5)	52	Minnesota State	51
2024; Details	Pittsburg, KS (Pittsburg State)	Robert W. Plaster Center	Adams State (6)	67	Pittsburg State	64.5
2025; Details	Indianapolis, IN (Indianapolis)	Fall Creek Pavilion	Pittsburg State	63	Minnesota State	58
2026; Details	Virginia Beach, VA (Norfolk State)	Virginia Beach Sports Center	Pittsburg State	69.5	West Texas A&M	59

== Champions ==
=== Active programs ===
Team	Titles	Years
Adams State	6	2008, 2014, 2017, 2019, 2023, 2024
St. Augustine's	6	1985, 1987, 2001, 2003, 2005, 2007
Lincoln (MO)	5	2004, 2006, 2009, 2010, 2016
Grand Valley State	3	2011, 2012, 2021
Pittsburg State	2	2025, 2026
Minnesota State	1	2022
West Texas A&M	1	2018
Central Missouri	1	2015
Academy of Art	1	2013

=== Former programs ===
Team	Titles	Years
Abilene Christian	12	1988, 1989, 1990, 1991, 1993, 1994, 1995, 1996, 1997, 1998, 1999, 2000
North Dakota State	1	2002
Alabama A&M	1	1992

== Championship records ==
Event	Record	Athlete	School	Nationality	Date	Place	Ref
60 m	7.11	Joy Udo-Gabriel	Missouri Southern	Nigeria	15 March 2025	Indianapolis	
200 m	22.88	Alexis Brown	Lenoir-Rhyne	United States	15 March 2025	Indianapolis	
400 m	51.78	Carly Muscaro	Merrimack	United States	March 2017	Birmingham	
3000 m	9:06.03	Stephanie Cotter	Adams State	Ireland	11 March 2023	Virginia Beach	
5000 m	15:41.30	Lindsay Cunningham	Winona State	United States	10 March 2023	Virginia Beach	
Pole vault	4.66 m	Brynn King	Roberts Wesleyan	United States	13 March 2025	Indianapolis	
4 × 400 m	3:36.41	Hannah Lakin; Kamaria Carr; Jasmine Haywood; Aerin Thompson	UT Tyler Patriots	United States	14 March 2026	Virginia Beach	
Distance medley relay	11:08.20	Jadyn Herron; Gabrielle Dunich; Charlotte Young; Helen Braybrook	CSU Pueblo ThunderWolves	United States	13 March 2026	Virginia Beach	

== See also ==
- NCAA Women's Indoor Track and Field Championship (Division I, Division III)
- AIAW Intercollegiate Women's Indoor Track and Field Champions
- NAIA Women's Indoor Track and Field Championship
- NCAA Men's Indoor Track and Field Championship (Division I, Division II, Division III)
- NCAA Women's Outdoor Track and Field Championship (Division I, Division II, Division III)
- NCAA Men's Outdoor Track and Field Championship (Division I, Division II, Division III)
