= Jamie Mueller (softball) =

American softball coach

Current position
- Title: Head coach
- Team: Wartburg
- Conference: ARC
- Record: 254–162 (.611)

Biographical details
- Born: Hanover Park, IL
- Education: Aurora; Northern Illinois University

Playing career
- 2005–2008: Aurora
- Position: Second Baseman

Coaching career (HC unless noted)
- 2010-2012: Aurora (Asst.)
- 2013-2015: DePauw (Asst.)
- 2016–Present: Wartburg

Head coaching record
- Overall: 254–162 (.611)
- Tournaments: IIAC/ARC 8−8; NCAA 8−12

Accomplishments and honors

Championships
- 2x A-R-C Regular Season (2025, 2026); 2x A-R-C Tournament (2022, 2023); NCAA Regional (2022)

Awards
- A-R-C Coach of the Year (2026)

Jamie Mueller is an American, former collegiate softball second baseman and current head coach at Wartburg College. She played college softball at Aurora.

== Playing career ==
Mueller played softball at Aurora University for three years. In her time with the Spartans, they compiled a 103–25 record, won three conference titles and made one NCAA Regional.

== Coaching career ==
=== DePauw ===
Mueller spent three seasons, beginning in 2013, as an assistant coach for DePauw University softball, under head coach Erica Hanrahan. In those three years the Tigers saw tremendous success winning three straight North Coast Athletic Conference championships and two NCAC tournament championships. In her final season as an assistant at DePauw, they finished with a 36–16 record and ended the season in the NCAA DIII College World Series.

=== Wartburg ===
On July 8, 2015, Mueller was named the new head coach for the Wartburg Knights softball program. Prior to her arrival in Waverly, the Knights had failed to qualify for the IIAC/ARC conference six team postseason tournament for the past six seasons, finishing on or near the bottom of the conference standings. In her first season, the Knights qualified for the conference tournament. In just her fourth season she led the Knights back to the NCAA tournament first time since 2009, receiving an at-large bid. Mueller's 2022 season found them back in NCAA tournament after winning the American Rivers Conference tournament. Following winning the NCAA regional at Saint Benedict College, the season would come to an end in Decatur, Illinois in the NCAA Super Regionals. The 2023 season she led her team to back to back conference tournament titles, and back to back regional appearances. Her team would end the season in the regional championship game to eventual national champion Trine, falling 4-1. On March 5, 2026, Mueller became the all-time winningest coach in Wartburg softball history with her 228th win against Misericordia University.

== Head coaching record ==
Record table
Season	Team	Overall	Conference	Standing	Postseason
Wartburg Knights (Iowa Intercollegiate Athletic Conference) (2016–2018)
2016	Wartburg	18-24	7-7	6th	
2017	Wartburg	22-16	9-7	4th	
2018	Wartburg	17-17	5-11	8th	
Wartburg Knights (American Rivers Conference) (2018–Present)
2019	Wartburg	27-13	11-5	3rd	NCAA Regional
2020	Wartburg	9−3 (Note: The season was not played past March 7th due to the COVID-19 pandemic in the United States.)			
2021	Wartburg	26−10	17−7	2nd	
2022	Wartburg	30−14	9−7	T-3rd	NCAA Super Regional
2023	Wartburg	25−18	10−6	4th	NCAA Regional
2024	Wartburg	23−18	9−6	T-3rd	NCAA Regional
2025	Wartburg	25−17	11−5	T-1st	NCAA Regional
2026	Wartburg	32−12	14−2	1st	NCAA Regional
Wartburg:		254–162 (.611)	92–63 (.594)		
Total:		254–162 (.611)			
National champion Postseason invitational champion Conference regular season champion Conference regular season and conference tournament champion Division regular season champion Division regular season and conference tournament champion Conference tournament champion
