= Wartburg Knights track and field =

Intercollegiate track and field team of for Wartburg College

- Head coach: Marcus Newsom (26th season)
- Conference: ARC
- Location: Waverly, IA
- Indoor track: Hoover Fieldhouse
- Outdoor track: Walston-Hoover Stadium
- Nickname: Knights
- Colors: Orange and Black

NCAA Indoor National Championships
- Women's: 2009, 2010, 2012

NCAA Outdoor National Championships
- Men's: 2021; Women's: 2005, 2009, 2012, 2013, 2014

Conference Indoor Championships
- Men's: 1998, 2001, 2003, 2004, 2005, 2006, 2008, 2009, 2012, 2014, 2015, 2019, 2021; Women's: 1998, 1999, 2000, 2001, 2002, 2003, 2004, 2005, 2006, 2007, 2008, 2009, 2010, 2011, 2012, 2013, 2014, 2015, 2016, 2018, 2020, 2021

Conference Outdoor Championships
- Men's: 1999, 2002, 2003, 2006, 2007, 2008, 2013, 2014, 2017, 2019, 2021, 2023; Women's: 1993, 1994, 1995, 2000, 2001, 2002, 2003, 2004, 2005, 2006, 2007, 2008, 2009, 2010, 2011, 2012, 2013, 2014, 2015, 2016, 2018, 2020, 2021, 2022, 2024 Cross Country: Men's: 1963, 1967, 1970, 1982, 1991, 1994, 1998, 1999, 2000, 2001, 2002, 2003, 2004, 2005, 2018, 2019, 2020, 2021, 2022, 2023, 2024; Women's: 1991, 1992, 1993, 1994, 1996, 1998, 2001, 2002, 2005, 2008, 2009, 2011, 2012, 2013, 2014, 2019, 2020, 2021, 2022, 2023, 2024

The Wartburg Knights track and field program is the intercollegiate track and field team for Wartburg College located in the U.S. state of Iowa. The team competes at the NCAA Division III level and is a member of the American Rivers Conference. The team participates in indoor and outdoor track and field as well as cross country.

== Women's track and field ==
The Wartburg women's track and field team has won 8 NCAA team national titles, 3 indoor and 5 outdoor, with their most recent coming in the 2014 outdoor season. The Knights won 3 straight NCAA outdoor titles from 2012 to 2014. The 2012 track and field season was one of the best seasons ever by a DIII team. The Knights won the 2012 NCAA DIII Indoor title with a meet-record of 99 points and followed that up with a 2012 NCAA DIII Outdoor title with another meet-record of 129 points, with record margin of victory of 77 points ahead of second place. During 2012 they had 22 indoor All-Americans and 26 outdoor All-Americans.

In the IIAC/ARC the Knights have 22 indoor conference championships with 19 of them coming in a row from 1998 to 2016. In outdoor track and field they have won 23 conference titles, 17 of them consecutively from 2000 to 2016.

=== Yearly record ===
Season	Coach	NCAA		Conference	
Season	Coach	Indoor	Outdoor	Indoor	Outdoor
American Rivers Conference
1983	Liz Wuertz	-	22nd (21)	-	2nd (127.5)
1984	Liz Wuertz	-	T-52nd (7)	-	-
1985	Liz Wuertz	-	-	-	2nd (134)
1986	Liz Wuertz	-	-	-	3rd (99)
1987	Liz Wuertz	-	-	-	-
1988	Liz Wuertz	T-24th (3)	T-29th (8)	-	3rd (93.5)
1989	Steve Johnson	-	-	-	4th (95.5)
1990	Steve Johnson	-	-	-	4th (95.5)
1991	Steve Johnson	52nd (7)	T-54th (1)	-	2nd (95.5)
1992	Steve Johnson	-	T-17th (14)	1st (171)	3rd (136)
1993	Steve Johnson	49th (4)	T-49th (4)	1st (175)	1st (195)
1994	Steve Johnson	38th (.5)	T-29th (8)	1st (191.5)	1st (170)
1995	Steve Johnson	-	T-21st (12)	-	1st (174.5)
1996	Steve Johnson	T-40th (1)	T-53rd (3)	-	3rd (119)
1997	Steve Johnson	T-16th (8)	T-53rd (3)	-	3rd (92)
1998	Steve Johnson	T-23rd (6)	12th(15)	1st (148.5)	2nd (141)
1999	Marcus Newsom	T-21st (6)	8th(24)	1st (161)	2nd (178)
2000	Marcus Newsom	T-39th (1)	T-11th(20)	-	1st
2001	Marcus Newsom	-	9th(21)	-	1st
2002	Marcus Newsom	6th (21)	6th(32)	-	1st (229)
2003	Marcus Newsom	6th (22)	9th(26)	1st (217)	1st (222.5)
2004	Marcus Newsom	T-29th (6)	4th(35)	1st (219)	1st (239)
2005	Marcus Newsom	2nd (32)	1st(43)	1st (191.5)	1st (224)
2006	Marcus Newsom	16th (12)	T-19th(14)	1st (241)	1st (242)
2007	Marcus Newsom	T-14th (12)	7th(31)	1st (262)	1st (267)
2008	Marcus Newsom	2nd (27)	3rd(34)	1st (259)	1st (279.5)
2009	Marcus Newsom	1st (51)	1st(52)	1st (276)	1st (243)
2010	Marcus Newsom	1st (33)	4th(36)	1st (242)	1st (241)
2011	Marcus Newsom	2nd (44)	2nd(59)	1st (251)	1st (279)
2012	Marcus Newsom	1st (99)	1st(129)	1st (317)	1st (353)
2013	Marcus Newsom	4th (25)	1st(46)	1st (262)	1st (286)
2014	Marcus Newsom	3rd (46)	1st(65)	1st (282)	1st (281.5)
2015	Marcus Newsom	T-14th (14)	T-15th(15)	1st (220)	1st (257.5)
2016	Marcus Newsom	T-35th (6)	T-14th(15)	1st (216)	1st (243)
2017	Marcus Newsom	T-21st (10)	T-17th(14)	2nd (183.33)	1st (212.5)
2018	Marcus Newsom	T-35th (6)	T-9th(24)	1st (212.5)	2nd (188)
2019	Marcus Newsom	T-35th (6)	T-14th(24)	2nd (212.5)	1st (188)
2020	Marcus Newsom	—	—	1st (211)	—
2021	Marcus Newsom	T-35th (6)	T-14th(15)	1st (212.5)	2nd (184)
2022	Marcus Newsom	T-35th (6)	T-14th(15)	2nd (188)	1st (231)
2023	Marcus Newsom	9th (23)	6th(29)	2nd (207)	2nd (218)
2024	Marcus Newsom	8th (24)		2nd (178.5)	1st (234.5)
Total		3	5	ARC: 22	ARC: 24

Note: The 2020 season was canceled after ARC Indoor Championships due to the Coronavirus Pandemic, the ARC Outdoor and NCAA Championships were not held.

== Men's track and field ==
The Wartburg men's track and field team won the 2021 NCAA DIII Outdoor national title. The Knights edged out Wisconsin Eau-Claire to win first title in men's track and field for both the college and head coach Marcus Newsom.

In the IIAC/ARC the Knights have won 11 indoor and 11 outdoor conference titles.

== Cross country ==
The Wartburg women's cross country team has had a strong history of high finishes at the NCAA Women's Division III Cross Country Championship. They have finished in trophy position 6 times, with a 2nd-place finish in 2012 and a 3rd-place finish in 2022. Wartburgs Missy Buttry won 3 straight cross country individual championships from 2002 to 2004. She became the first athlete ever, regardless of gender, to win 3 straight NCAA cross country individual titles and first woman ever to win 3 titles in cross country.
