= NCAA Division II men's indoor track and field championships =

United States collegiate competition

- Association: NCAA
- Sport: College indoor track and field
- Founded: 1985; 41 years ago
- Division: Division II
- Country: United States; Canada
- Most recent champion: Pittsburg State (4th)
- Most titles: Abilene Christian (13); St. Augustine's (13)
- Broadcaster: ESPNU
- Website: NCAA.com

The NCAA Division II women's indoor track and field championships are contested at an annual meet organized by the National Collegiate Athletic Association to determine the individual and team national champions of men's collegiate indoor track and field among its Division II members in the United States and Canada. It has been held every year since 1985, except for 2020.

The most successful programs have been Abilene Christian and St. Augustine's, each with 13 titles.

The three-time reigning champions are Pittsburg State, who won their fourth team national title in 2025.

== Format ==
Athletes' individual performances earn points for their institution and the team with the most points receives the NCAA team title in track and field.

=== Track events ===
- Sprint events
  - 60 meter dash
  - 200 meter dash
  - 400 meter dash
- Distance events
  - 800 meter run
  - Mile run
  - 3,000 meter run
  - 5,000 meter run
- Hurdle Events
  - 60 meter high hurdles
- Relay events
  - 1,600 meter relay
  - Distance medley relay

=== Field events ===
- Jumping events
  - High jump
  - Pole vault
  - Long jump
  - Triple jump
- Throwing events
  - Shot put
  - Weight throw
- Multi-events
  - Heptathlon

== Summary ==
NCAA Division II Men's Indoor Track and Field Championships
Year	Site (Host)	Stadium/Arena	Championship Results			
Year	Site (Host)	Stadium/Arena	Winner	Points	Runners-up	Points
1985; Details	Fargo, ND (North Dakota State)	–	Southeast Missouri State	80	St. Augustine's	48
1986	Not held					
1987; Details	Fargo, ND (North Dakota State)	–	St. Augustine's	74	Mount St. Mary's	38
1988; Details	Vermillion, SD (South Dakota)	Dakota Dome	St. Augustine's (2); Abilene Christian	62	Mount St. Mary's	38
1989; Details	Vermillion, SD (South Dakota)	Dakota Dome	St. Augustine's (3)	94	Mankato State	31
1990; Details	Vermillion, SD (South Dakota)	Dakota Dome	St. Augustine's (4)	70	Abilene Christian	46
1991; Details	Vermillion, SD (South Dakota)	Dakota Dome	St. Augustine's (5)	98	Southeast Missouri State	36
1992; Details	Bay City, MI (Saginaw Valley State)	–	St. Augustine's (6)	81	Abilene Christian; Norfolk State	24
1993; Details	Vermillion, SD (South Dakota)	Dakota Dome	Abilene Christian (2)	69	St. Augustine's	61
1994; Details	Fargo, ND (North Dakota State)	–	Abilene Christian (3)	101	St. Augustine's	44
1995; Details	Indianapolis, IN (Indianapolis)	RCA Dome	St. Augustine's (7)	90 3/4	Abilene Christian	84 3/4
1996; Details	Indianapolis, IN (Indianapolis)	RCA Dome	Abilene Christian (4)	86 5/6	St. Augustine's	46 1/3
1997; Details	Indianapolis, IN (Indianapolis)	RCA Dome	Abilene Christian (5)	132	St. Augustine's	43
1998; Details	Indianapolis, IN (Indianapolis)	RCA Dome	Abilene Christian (6)	85	St. Augustine's	59
1999; Details	Indianapolis, IN (Indianapolis)	RCA Dome	Abilene Christian (7)	85	St. Augustine's	50
2000; Details	Boston, MA	Reggie Lewis Track	Abilene Christian (8)	80	St. Augustine's	77
2001; Details	Boston, MA	Reggie Lewis Track	St. Augustine's (8)	74	New York Tech	48
2002; Details	Boston, MA	Reggie Lewis Track	Abilene Christian (9)	74	St. Augustine's; Western State	44
2003; Details	Boston, MA	Reggie Lewis Track	Abilene Christian (10)	58	Western State	54
2004; Details	Boston, MA	Reggie Lewis Track	Abilene Christian (11)	55	St. Augustine's	50
2005; Details	Boston, MA	Reggie Lewis Track	Abilene Christian (12)	84	Adams State	46
2006; Details	Boston, MA	Reggie Lewis Track	St. Augustine's (9)	66 1/2	Abilene Christian	55
2007; Details	Boston, MA	Reggie Lewis Track	St. Augustines †	88	Abilene Christian	48 1/2
2008; Details	Mankato, MN (Minnesota State)	Myers Fieldhouse	St. Augustine's (10)	68	Abilene Christian	49
2009; Details	Houston, TX	Yeoman Field House	St. Augustine's (11)	105	Adams State	80
2010; Details	Albuquerque, NM	Albuquerque Convention Center	Adams State	89	St. Augustine's	72
2011; Details	Albuquerque, NM	Albuquerque Convention Center	Abilene Christian (13)	49	Ashland	42
2012; Details	Mankato, MN (Minnesota State)	Myers Fieldhouse	Grand Canyon	54	Adams State	47
2013; Details	Birmingham, AL	Birmingham CrossPlex	St. Augustine's (12)	72	Ashland	59 1/2
2014; Details	Winston-Salem, NC	JDL Fast Track	St. Augustine's (13)	84 1/2	Adams State	83
2015; Details	Birmingham, AL	Birmingham CrossPlex	Adams State (2)	45	Findlay	40
2016; Details	Pittsburg, KS (Pittsburg State)	Robert W. Plaster Center	Tiffin	49	Adams State	47
2017; Details	Birmingham, AL	Birmingham CrossPlex	Tiffin (2)	63	Ashland	52
2018; Details	Pittsburg, KS (Pittsburg State)	Robert W. Plaster Center	Pittsburg State	49	Ashland	48
2019; Details	Pittsburg, KS (Pittsburg State)	Robert W. Plaster Center	Ashland	38	Adams State	37
2020	Not held					
2021; Details	Birmingham, AL	Birmingham CrossPlex	Ashland (2)	70	Grand Valley State	53
2022; Details	Pittsburg, KS (Pittsburg State)	Robert W. Plaster Center	Grand Valley State	66	Ashland	49
2023; Details	Virginia Beach, VA (Norfolk State)	Virginia Beach Sports Center	Pittsburg State (2)	86	Adams State	42
2024; Details	Pittsburg, KS (Pittsburg State)	Robert W. Plaster Center	Pittsburg State (3)	69	Grand Valley State	56.5
2025; Details	Indianapolis, IN (Indianapolis)	Fall Creek Pavilion	Pittsburg State (4)	76	Grand Valley State	61.5
2026; Details	Virginia Beach, VA (Norfolk State)	Virginia Beach Sports Center	Pittsburg State (5)	75.5	Grand Valley State	51.5

- † Participation vacated by the NCAA Committee on Infractions.

== Champions ==
Team national championships among active programs: 12, 4, 3, 2, 1

=== Active programs ===
Team	Titles	Years
St. Augustine's	13	1987, 1988*, 1989, 1990, 1991, 1992, 1995, 2001, 2006, 2008, 2009, 2013, 2014
Pittsburg State	5	2018, 2023, 2024, 2025, 2026
Ashland	2	2019, 2021
Tiffin	2	2016, 2017
Adams State	2	2010, 2015
Grand Valley State	1	2022

=== Former programs ===
Team	Titles	Years
Abilene Christian	13	1988*, 1993, 1994, 1996, 1997, 1998, 1999, 2000, 2002, 2003, 2004, 2005, 2011
Grand Canyon	1	2012
Southeast Missouri State	1	1985

== Championship Records ==
Event	Record	Athlete	School	Nationality	Date	Place	Ref
200 m	20.48	Trevor Bassitt	Ashland	United States	13 March 2021	Birmingham	
800 m	1:46.78	Oussama El Bouchayby	Angelo State	Morocco	11 March 2023	Virginia Beach	
Mile	3:59.15	Titouan Le Grix	Wingate	France	15 March 2025	Indianapolis	
3000 m	7:46.38	Romain Legendre	Adams State	France	15 March 2025	Indianapolis	
5000 m	13:33.58	Romain Legendre	Adams State	France	13 March 2025	Indianapolis	
60 m hurdles	7.51	Cordell Tinch	Pittsburg State	United States	11 March 2023	Virginia Beach	
Pole vault	5.60 m	Vladyslav Malykhin	Harding	Ukraine	9 March 2024	Pittsburgh	
Long jump	8.04 m	Henry Kiner	Pittsburg State	United States	10 March 2023	Virginia Beach	
4 x 400 metres relay	3:07.18	Dapriest Hogans; Woyn Chatman; Caden Williams; Nate Watson	Pittsburg State	United States; United States; United States; United States	15 March 2025	Indianapolis	
Distance medley relay	9:32.58	Dylan Sprecker; Caden Williams; Jordan Kilonzo; Mason Strader	Pittsburg State	United States; United States; United States; United States	14 March 2025	Indianapolis	

== See also ==
- NCAA Men's Indoor Track and Field Championships (Division I, Division III)
- NAIA Men's Indoor Track and Field Championship
- Pre-NCAA Outdoor Track and Field Champions
- NCAA Women's Indoor Track and Field Championships (Division I, Division II, Division III)
- NCAA Men's Outdoor Track and Field Championships (Division I, Division II, Division III)
- NCAA Women's Outdoor Track and Field Championships (Division I, Division II, Division III)
