= Wisconsin–La Crosse Eagles =

Intercollegiate sports teams of University of Wisconsin–La Crosse

- University: University of Wisconsin–La Crosse
- Nickname: Eagles
- NCAA: Division III
- Conference: WIAC
- Athletic director: Kim Blum
- Location: La Crosse, Wisconsin
- Football stadium: Veterans Memorial Stadium
- Basketball arena: Mitchell Hall Gymnasium
- Baseball stadium: Copeland Park
- Softball stadium: North Campus Field
- Soccer stadium: Veterans Memorial Field Sports Complex
- Lacrosse stadium: Veterans Memorial Field Sports Complex
- Colors: Maroon and gray
- Website: uwlathletics.com
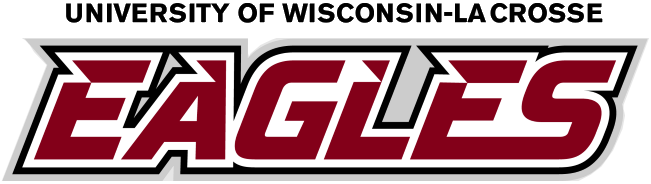

Team NCAA championships
- 54

The University of Wisconsin–La Crosse Eagles (casually known as the UW–La Crosse Eagles) are the athletic teams of the University of Wisconsin–La Crosse. The Eagles athletic teams compete in at the NCAA Division III as a member of the Wisconsin Intercollegiate Athletic Conference (WIAC). Wisconsin–La Crosse's teams were known as the Indians from 1937 to 1989. The name was changed because of concerns of racial insensitivity regarding Native Americans; see Native American mascot controversy.

== Varsity sports ==
Men's sports	Women's sports
Baseball	Basketball
Basketball	Cross country
Cross country	Golf
Football	Gymnastics
Swimming	Lacrosse
Tennis	Soccer
Track and field	Softball
Wrestling	Swimming
	Tennis
	Track and field
	Volleyball

== National championships ==
=== Team ===
Wisconsin–La Crosse has won 81 National Championships including: 54 National Collegiate Athletic Association (NCAA), 7 National Association of Intercollegiate Athletics (NAIA), 2 Association for Intercollegiate Athletics for Women (AIAW), and 18 National Collegiate Gymnastics Association (NCGA).

Sport	Association	Division	Year	Opponent/Runner–up	Score
Women's Basketball (1)	AIAW	Division III	1981	Mount Mercy (IA)	79–71
Men's Bowling (3)	NAIA	Division I	1967	Pomona (CA)	N/A
Men's Bowling (3)	NAIA	Division I	1968	Harding (AR)	N/A
Men's Bowling (3)	NAIA	Division I	1969	Adelphi (NY)	N/A
Men's Cross Country (5)	NCAA	Division III	1996	North Central (IL)	86–94
Men's Cross Country (5)	NCAA	Division III	2001	Calvin (MI)	80–140
Men's Cross Country (5)	NCAA	Division III	2005	Calvin (MI)	94–117
Men's Cross Country (5)	NCAA	Division III	2024	Wartburg (IA)	77–173
Men's Cross Country (5)	NCAA	Division III	2025	SUNY Geneseo (NY)	82–132
Women's Cross Country (1)	NCAA	Division III	1983	St. Thomas (MN)	45–70
Football (3)	NAIA	Division II	1985	Pacific Lutheran (WA)	24–7
Football (3)	NCAA	Division III	1992	Washington & Jefferson (PA)	16–12
Football (3)	NCAA	Division III	1995	Rowan (NJ)	36–7
Men's Gymnastics (3)	NAIA	Division I	1975	N/A	N/A
Men's Gymnastics (3)	NAIA	Division I	1976	N/A	N/A
Men's Gymnastics (3)	NAIA	Division I	1977	N/A	N/A
Women's Gymnastics (18)	NCGA	Division III	1986	N/A	N/A
Women's Gymnastics (18)	NCGA	Division III	1988	N/A	N/A
Women's Gymnastics (18)	NCGA	Division III	1995	N/A	N/A
Women's Gymnastics (18)	NCGA	Division III	1997	N/A	N/A
Women's Gymnastics (18)	NCGA	Division III	1999	N/A	N/A
Women's Gymnastics (18)	NCGA	Division III	2001	N/A	N/A
Women's Gymnastics (18)	NCGA	Division III	2002	N/A	N/A
Women's Gymnastics (18)	NCGA	Division III	2003	N/A	N/A
Women's Gymnastics (18)	NCGA	Division III	2004	N/A	N/A
Women's Gymnastics (18)	NCGA	Division III	2005	N/A	N/A
Women's Gymnastics (18)	NCGA	Division III	2006	N/A	N/A
Women's Gymnastics (18)	NCGA	Division III	2008	N/A	N/A
Women's Gymnastics (18)	NCGA	Division III	2009	N/A	N/A
Women's Gymnastics (18)	NCGA	Division III	2010	N/A	N/A
Women's Gymnastics (18)	NCGA	Division III	2011	N/A	N/A
Women's Gymnastics (18)	NCGA	Division III	2015	N/A	N/A
Women's Gymnastics (18)	NCGA	Division III	2016	N/A	N/A
Women's Gymnastics (18)	NCGA	Division III	2025	N/A	N/A
Men's Indoor Track & Field (21)	NCAA	Division III	1987	St. Lawrence (NY)	44.5–43
Men's Indoor Track & Field (21)	NCAA	Division III	1988	St. Lawrence (NY)	36–30
Men's Indoor Track & Field (21)	NCAA	Division III	1991	Lincoln (PA)	58–47.5
Men's Indoor Track & Field (21)	NCAA	Division III	1992	Lincoln (PA)	57–49
Men's Indoor Track & Field (21)	NCAA	Division III	1993	Lincoln (PA)	70–48
Men's Indoor Track & Field (21)	NCAA	Division III	1994	Nebraska Wesleyan	50–42
Men's Indoor Track & Field (21)	NCAA	Division III	1997	Lincoln (PA)	44–41
Men's Indoor Track & Field (21)	NCAA	Division III	2001	Wisconsin–Oshkosh	58–44
Men's Indoor Track & Field (21)	NCAA	Division III	2002	Lincoln (PA)	54–48
Men's Indoor Track & Field (21)	NCAA	Division III	2003	Wisconsin–Oshkosh	71–34
Men's Indoor Track & Field (21)	NCAA	Division III	2004	Wisconsin–Whitewater & Lincoln (PA)	70–29
Men's Indoor Track & Field (21)	NCAA	Division III	2005	Lincoln (PA)	53–38
Men's Indoor Track & Field (21)	NCAA	Division III	2006	Lincoln (PA)	78–31
Men's Indoor Track & Field (21)	NCAA	Division III	2008	Monmouth (IL)	43–33
Men's Indoor Track & Field (21)	NCAA	Division III	2009^	Whitworth (WA)	32–24
Men's Indoor Track & Field (21)	NCAA	Division III	2013	Wisconsin–Oshkosh	74–40
Men's Indoor Track & Field (21)	NCAA	Division III	2014	Wisconsin–Eau Claire	63.5–48
Men's Indoor Track & Field (21)	NCAA	Division III	2017^^	Wisconsin–Whitewater	34–30
Men's Indoor Track & Field (21)	NCAA	Division III	2023	MIT	35–34.5
Men's Indoor Track & Field (21)	NCAA	Division III	2024	Wisconsin–Eau Claire	74–52
Men's Indoor Track & Field (21)	NCAA	Division III	2025	Wisconsin–Oshkosh	84–39
Women's Indoor Track & Field (2)	NCAA	Division III	2015	Wisconsin–Oshkosh	55–49
Women's Indoor Track & Field (2)	NCAA	Division III	2023	Washington University (MO)	59.5–54
Men's Outdoor Track & Field (18)	NCAA	Division III	1988	Lincoln (PA)	54–47
Men's Outdoor Track & Field (18)	NCAA	Division III	1991	Lincoln (PA)	73–64
Men's Outdoor Track & Field (18)	NCAA	Division III	1992	Lincoln (PA)	73.5–51.5
Men's Outdoor Track & Field (18)	NCAA	Division III	1993	Lincoln (PA)	97–76
Men's Outdoor Track & Field (18)	NCAA	Division III	1997	Lincoln (PA)	69.5–58.33
Men's Outdoor Track & Field (18)	NCAA	Division III	2001	Lincoln (PA)	80–60
Men's Outdoor Track & Field (18)	NCAA	Division III	2002	Calvin (MI)	64–41
Men's Outdoor Track & Field (18)	NCAA	Division III	2003	Lincoln (PA)	88–64
Men's Outdoor Track & Field (18)	NCAA	Division III	2004	Nebraska Wesleyan	88–64
Men's Outdoor Track & Field (18)	NCAA	Division III	2006	Lincoln (PA)	74.5–54
Men's Outdoor Track & Field (18)	NCAA	Division III	2007	SUNY Cortland (NY)	99–34
Men's Outdoor Track & Field (18)	NCAA	Division III	2013	Wisconsin–Eau Claire	66–64
Men's Outdoor Track & Field (18)	NCAA	Division III	2015	Wisconsin–Eau Claire	71–46
Men's Outdoor Track & Field (18)	NCAA	Division III	2016	Wisconsin–Eau Claire	41–33
Men's Outdoor Track & Field (18)	NCAA	Division III	2017	Wisconsin–Whitewater	47–45
Men's Outdoor Track & Field (18)	NCAA	Division III	2024	Wisconsin–Oshkosh	76–48
Men's Outdoor Track & Field (18)	NCAA	Division III	2025	Wisconsin–Eau Claire	84–56
Men's Outdoor Track & Field (18)	NCAA	Division III	2026	Rowan (NJ)	106–85
Women's Outdoor Track & Field (6)	AIAW	Division III	1982	N/A	N/A
Women's Outdoor Track & Field (6)	NCAA	Division III	1983	St. Thomas (MN)	156–126
Women's Outdoor Track & Field (6)	NCAA	Division III	1984	Central (IA)	185.5–102
Women's Outdoor Track & Field (6)	NCAA	Division III	2015	Wisconsin–Eau Claire	73–43
Women's Outdoor Track & Field (6)	NCAA	Division III	2023	Loras (IA)	67.5–58
Women's Outdoor Track & Field (6)	NCAA	Division III	2026	Washington University (MO)	53–42

^ Split 2009 title with Wisconsin–Oshkosh

^^ Split 2017 title with North Central (IL)

== WIAC conference championships ==
=== Conference regular season championships ===
As of June 1st, 2026, UWL has won 462 WIAC Conference Championships in the following sports:

WIAC titles	Cross country	Football	Soccer	Volleyball	Basketball	Gymnastics	Swimming	Indoor track and field	Outdoor track and field	Wrestling	Baseball	Softball	Golf	Tennis	Badminton	Total
Men's	40	35	0	0	12	12	5	49	60	24	14	0	16	6	0	273
Women's	14	0	8	12	10	24	23	32	40	0	0	2	0	16	8	189
Total	54	35	8	12	22	36	28	81	100	24	14	2	16	22	8	462

=== Conference tournament championships ===
Additionally, UWL has won 17 WIAC Tournament Championships in the following sports:

WIAC titles	Soccer	Basketball	Baseball	Softball	Total
Men's	0	1	4	0	5
Women's	7	1	0	4	12
Total	7	2	4	4	17

== Individual teams ==
=== Football ===
The Eagles football team plays its home games at Veterans Memorial Stadium. The football program has won three national titles: the NAIA Division II Football National Championship in 1985 and NCAA Division III Football Championship in 1992 and 1995, all during the tenure of Roger Harring, who served as head coach from 1969 to 1999 and was inducted into the College Football Hall of Fame in 2005.

=== Track and field ===
The Eagles have won 21 team titles at the NCAA Division III Men's Indoor Track and Field Championships and 18 team titles at the NCAA Division III Men's Outdoor Track and Field Championships. Both totals are the best in Division III history.

== Notable athletes ==
- Jerry Augustine, MLB player
- Will Berzinski, NFL player
- Sam Blaskowski, Track and Field Sprinter
- Caleb Boushley, MLB pitcher
- Ben Braun, college basketball coach
- Roman Brumm, NFL player
- Mike Dee, college baseball coach at University of Illinois at Chicago
- Brian Gutekunst, NFL General Manager, Green Bay Packers
- Don Iverson, professional golfer on the PGA Tour
- Don Kindt, Jr., NFL player
- Tom Klawitter, MLB player
- Craig Kusick, baseball player
- Craig Kusick, Jr., Arena Football League quarterback
- Ace Loomis, NFL player
- Mike Maslowski, National Football League (NFL) linebacker
- Ric Mathias, NFL player
- Greg Mattison, NCAA and NFL football coach
- Neal Nelson, Hall of Fame basketball coach
- Tom Newberry, NFL offensive Lineman
- Andrew Rock, Olympic Sprinter, Gold Medalist
- Vinny Rottino, MLB player
- Bill Schroeder, 1994, NFL wide receiver
- Webb Schultz, MLB player
- Ed Servais, college baseball coach at Saint Mary's and Creighton
- Ellen Tronnier, All-American Girls Professional Baseball League player
- Jeremy Unertl, Arena Football League player
- Joel Williams, NFL linebacker
