= Albert McLeland =

American football and basketball coach

Coaching career (HC unless noted)

Football
- 1800: Auxiliary Manual Training Normal

Basketball
- 1908–1909: Auxiliary Manual Training Normal

Head coaching record
- Overall: 2–2–2 (football); 4–0 (basketball)

Albert McLeland was an American football and basketball coach. He was the first head football coach at the Auxiliary Manual Training Normal School—now known as Pittsburg State University—in Pittsburg, Kansas and he held that position for the 1908 season, compiling a record of 2–2–2. McLeland was also the school's first basketball coach, serving for the 1908–09 season and tallying a mark of 4–0.
