= NCAA Women's Outdoor Track and Field Championship =

College athletics tournament in the US

The NCAA Women's Outdoor Track and Field Championship refers to one of three annual collegiate outdoor track and field competitions for women organised by the National Collegiate Athletic Association (NCAA) for athletes from institutions that make up its three divisions: Division I, II, and III. In each event athlete's individual performances earn points for their institution and the team with the most points receives the NCAA team title in track and field.

- NCAA Division I Women's Outdoor Track and Field Championships
- NCAA Division II Women's Outdoor Track and Field Championships
- NCAA Division III Women's Outdoor Track and Field Championships

A separate NCAA men's competition is also held.

== See also ==
- AIAW Intercollegiate Women's Outdoor Track and Field Champions
- NCAA Women's Indoor Track and Field Championship
- NCAA Men's Indoor Track and Field Championship
- NCAA Men's Outdoor Track and Field Championship
