= Wartburg Knights =

College sports teams

- College: Wartburg College
- Nickname: Knights
- NCAA: Division III
- Conference: American Rivers Conference
- Athletic director: John Cochrane
- Location: Waverly, IA
- Varsity teams: 27
- Football stadium: Walston-Hoover Stadium
- Basketball arena: Levick Arena
- Baseball stadium: Harms Stadium at Hertel Field
- Softball stadium: Lynes Field
- Soccer stadium: Salzwedel Field
- Golf course: Prairie Links Golf Course
- Tennis venue: Meirink Family Tennis Facility
- Outdoor track and field venue: Hoover Fieldhouse
- Colors: Orange and Black
- Mascot: Sir Victor
- Fight song: U RAH RAH RAH!
- Website: go-knights.net

Team NCAA championships
- 26

The Wartburg Knights are the athletic teams that represent Wartburg College, located in Waverly, Iowa. The Knights have varsity teams in 27 sports, 13 for men and 14 for women. The teams participate in Division III of the National Collegiate Athletic Association (NCAA) and are members of the American Rivers Conference. Currently, the school's athletic director is John Cochrane.

Wartburg has had a strong history in athletics at the Division III level. The Knights wrestling team has an NCAA Division III leading 15 national championships. The Knights also have multiple national championships in both women's indoor track and field(3) and women's outdoor track and field(5), with men's track and field winning one in 2021. The Knights made history in the spring of 2012 when they became the first and only school to win two national titles in one day when both wrestling and women's indoor track and field won. In basketball, the Wartburg women have reached the NCAA Final Four on three occasions, most recently in 2024. The men's team has made the Elite Eight once and the Sweet Sixteen on three occasions, most recently in 2017. The baseball team has reached the College World Series twice, most recently in 2005. Wartburg's softball team has played in the Women's College World Series once, in 2003.

In May 2024, Wartburg secured their 20th straight American Rivers Conference all-sports trophy. The Knights have won the trophy every year since its inception in 2003. They also won the men's all-sports trophy for the 25th time and have won the women's all sports trophy 18 times.

== Sports sponsored ==
| Men's sports | Women's sports |
|---|---|
| Baseball | Basketball |
| Basketball | Bowling |
| Bowling | Clay Target Sports |
| Clay Target Sports | Cross country |
| Cross country | Esports |
| Esports | Golf |
| Football | Soccer |
| Golf | Softball |
| Soccer | Tennis |
| Tennis | Track and field |
| Track and field | Volleyball |
| Wrestling | Wrestling |

== Current head coaches ==
| Team | Coach |
Wartburg NCAA Sport Head Coaches
| Baseball | Casey Klunder |
| Basketball (Men's) | Sam Leal |
| Basketball (Women's) | Bob Amsberry |
| Cross Country | Ryan Chapman |
| Football | Chris Winter |
| Golf (Director) | Jason Steege |
| Golf (Women's) | John Thompson |
| Soccer (Men's) | Mike Madigan |
| Soccer (Women's) | Emily Ryan |
| Softball | Jamie Mueller |
| Tennis (Men's and Women's) | Chris Gustas |
| Track and field (Men's and Women's) | Marcus Newsom |
| Volleyball | DeAnn Akins |
| Wrestling (Men's) | Eric Keller |
| Wrestling (Women's) | Brady Kyner |

== Championships ==
=== NCAA team championships ===
Wartburg has won 26 NCAA team championships.

National Championships (26)
Men's (18)
| Sport | Year | Head Coach | Tournament |
|---|---|---|---|
| Outdoor Track & Field | 2021 | Marcus Newsom | NCAA |
| Wrestling | 1996 | Jim Miller | NCAA |
| Wrestling | 1999 | Jim Miller | NCAA |
| Wrestling | 2003 | Jim Miller | NCAA |
| Wrestling | 2004 | Jim Miller | NCAA |
| Wrestling | 2006 | Jim Miller | NCAA |
| Wrestling | 2008 | Jim Miller | NCAA |
| Wrestling | 2009 | Jim Miller | NCAA |
| Wrestling | 2011 | Jim Miller/Eric Keller | NCAA |
| Wrestling | 2012 | Jim Miller/Eric Keller | NCAA |
| Wrestling | 2013 | Jim Miller/Eric Keller | NCAA |
| Wrestling | 2014 | Eric Keller | NCAA |
| Wrestling | 2016 | Eric Keller | NCAA |
| Wrestling | 2017 | Eric Keller | NCAA |
| Wrestling | 2018 | Eric Keller | NCAA |
| Wrestling | 2022 | Eric Keller | NCAA |
| Wrestling | 2025 | Eric Keller | NCAA |
| Wrestling | 2026 | Eric Keller | NCAA |
Women's (8)
| Indoor Track & Field | 2009 | Marcus Newsom | NCAA |
| Indoor Track & Field | 2010 | Marcus Newsom | NCAA |
| Indoor Track & Field | 2012 | Marcus Newsom | NCAA |
| Outdoor Track & Field | 2005 | Marcus Newsom | NCAA |
| Outdoor Track & Field | 2009 | Marcus Newsom | NCAA |
| Outdoor Track & Field | 2012 | Marcus Newsom | NCAA |
| Outdoor Track & Field | 2013 | Marcus Newsom | NCAA |
| Outdoor Track & Field | 2014 | Marcus Newsom | NCAA |

=== Conference championships ===
Wartburg has 282 championships in the American Rivers Conference (A-R-C), known as the Iowa Intercollegiate Athletic Conference (IIAC) from 1927 to 2018.

Conference Championships (282)
| Titles | Sport | Year |
|---|---|---|
| 43 | Men's Wrestling | IIAC: 1948, 1949, 1950, 1951, 1954, 1960, 1974, 1976, 1977, 1978, 1993, 1994, 1995, 1996, 1997, 1998, 1999, 2000, 2001, 2002, 2003, 2004, 2005, 2006, 2007, 2008, 2009, 2010, 2011, 2012, 2013, 2014, 2015, 2016, 2017, 2018; A-R-C: 2019, 2021, 2022, 2023, 2024, 2025, 2026 |
| 26 | Women's Outdoor Track and Field | IIAC: 1993, 1994, 1995, 2000, 2001, 2002, 2003, 2004, 2005, 2006, 2007, 2008, 2009, 2010, 2011, 2012, 2013, 2014, 2015, 2016, 2018; A-R-C: 2020, 2021, 2024, 2025, 2026 |
| 22 | Baseball | IIAC: 1961, 1962, 1963, 1977, 1978, 1979, 1997, 1998, 1999, 2000, 2001, 2002, 2003, 2004, 2005, 2006, 2007, 2008, 2013, 2015, 2016, 2017 |
| 22 | Men's Cross Country | IIAC: 1963, 1967, 1970, 1982, 1991, 1994, 1998, 1999, 2000, 2001, 2002, 2003, 2004, 2005; A-R-C: 2018, 2019, 2020, 2021, 2022, 2023, 2024, 2025 |
| 22 | Women's Cross Country | IIAC: 1991, 1992, 1993, 1994, 1996, 1998, 2001, 2002, 2005, 2008, 2009, 2011, 2012, 2013, 2014; A-R-C: 2019, 2020, 2021, 2022, 2023, 2024, 2025 |
| 21 | Men's Basketball | IIAC: 1952, 1955, 1959, 1960, 1967, 1968, 1969, 1970, 1971, 1972, 1973, 1974, 1975, 1983, 1987, 1989, 1991, 1993, 2001, 2005, 2006 |
| 21 | Football | IIAC: 1958, 1959, 1968, 1982, 1983, 1993, 1999, 2002, 2003, 2004, 2008, 2010, 2013, 2014, 2017; A-R-C: 2018, 2019, 2022, 2023, 2024, 2025 |
| 18 | Women's Indoor Track & Field | IIAC: 2003, 2004, 2005, 2006, 2007, 2008, 2009, 2010, 2011, 2012, 2013, 2014, 2015, 2016, 2018; A-R-C: 2020, 2021, 2026 |
| 14 | Men's Outdoor Track & Field | IIAC: 1999, 2002, 2003, 2006, 2007, 2008, 2013, 2014, 2017; A-R-C: 2019, 2021, 2023, 2025, 2026 |
| 13 | Men's Indoor Track & Field | IIAC: 2003, 2004, 2005, 2006, 2008, 2009, 2012, 2014, 2015; A-R-C: 2019, 2021, 2025, 2026 |
| 13 | Women's Basketball | IIAC: 1990, 1992, 2001, 2002, 2003, 2017, 2018; A-R-C: 2019, 2020, 2023, 2024, 2025, 2026 |
| 12 | Women's Golf | IIAC: 2004, 2005, 2007, 2008, 2009, 2010, 2011, 2012, 2013, 2014, 2015, 2017 |
| 10 | Women's Volleyball | IIAC: 2002, 2012, 2013, 2015, 2016, 2017; A-R-C: 2018, 2019, 2020, 2021 |
| 6 | Men's Golf | IIAC: 1955, 1960, 1971, 1972, 2004, 2006 |
| 6 | Men's Soccer | IIAC: 2004, 2005, 2006, 2010, 2013; A-R-C: 2025 |
| 5 | Softball | IIAC: 2001, 2006, 2008; A-R-C: 2025, 2026 |
| 4 | Women's Soccer | IIAC: 2008, 2011, 2015; A-R-C: 2020 |
| 2 | Women's Wrestling | A-R-C: 2025, 2026 |
| 1 | Men's Tennis | IIAC: 1993 |
| 1 | Women's Tennis | A-R-C: 2018 |
| 282 | Total | IIAC: 220; A-R-C: 62 |

=== Director's Cup ===
The NACDA Directors' Cup is an award given annually by the National Association of Collegiate Directors of Athletics to the colleges and universities with the most success in collegiate athletics. Points for the NACDA Directors' Cup are based on order of finish in various NCAA sponsored championships or based on various polls. The following is Wartburg's finish out of over 300 NCAA DIII institution's in the Director's Cup since 1995:

| Year | Standing |
Wartburg Learfield Director's Cup Standings
| 1995–96 | T89th |
| 1996–97 | 63rd |
| 1997–98 | 39th |
| 1998–99 | T-25th |
| 1999–00 | 34th |
| 2000–01 | 10th |
| 2001–02 | 15th |
| 2002–03 | 7th |
| 2003–04 | 13th |
| 2004–05 | 12th |
| 2005–06 | 17th |
| 2006–07 | 24td |
| 2007–08 | 8th |
| 2008–09 | 15th |
| 2009–10 | 32nd |
| 2010–11 | 15th |
| 2011–12 | 18th |
| 2012–13 | 18th |
| 2013–14 | 11th |
| 2014–15 | 15th |
| 2015–16 | 21st |
| 2016–17 | 26th |
| 2017–18 | 18th |
| 2018–19 | 24th |
| 2019–20 | N/A (COVID) |
| 2020–21 | N/A (COVID) |
| 2021–22 | 17th |
| 2022–23 | 16th |
| 2023–24 | 17th |
| 2024–25 | 26th |
| 2025–26 | 17th |

^indicates a current standing
Red indicates ranking down from previous year
Green indicates ranking up from previous year
