= Pittsburg State Gorillas =

- University: Pittsburg State University
- Nickname: Gorillas
- NCAA: Division II
- Conference: The MIAA
- Athletic director: Anthony Crespino
- Location: Pittsburg, Kansas
- Varsity teams: 12
- Football stadium: Brandenburg Field at Carnie Smith Stadium
- Basketball arena: John Lance Arena
- Colors: Crimson and gold
- Mascot: GUS the Gorilla
- Fight song: "On to Victory!"
- Website: pittstategorillas.com

The Pittsburg State Gorillas, commonly referred to as Pitt State, are the athletic teams that represent Pittsburg State University. They are in the NCAA Division II as a member of the Mid-America Intercollegiate Athletics Association (MIAA). The Gorillas previously competed in the Central States Intercollegiate Conference (CSIC) of the National Association of Intercollegiate Athletics (NAIA) from 1976–77 to 1988–89; in the Great Plains Athletic Conference (GPAC) from 1972–73 to 1975–76; in the Rocky Mountain Athletic Conference (RMAC) from 1968–69 to 1971–72; in the Central Intercollegiate Athletic Conference (CIC) from 1923–24 to 1967–68; and in the Kansas Collegiate Athletic Conference (KCAC) from 1902–03 to 1922–23.

== Varsity teams ==
Pittsburg State competes in 14 intercollegiate varsity sports:

Men's sports	Women's sports
Baseball	Basketball
Basketball	Cross country
Cross country	Soccer
Football	Softball
Golf	Track and field^{†}
Track and field^{†}	Volleyball
† – Track and field includes both indoor and outdoor

=== Football ===
MIAA logo in Pittsburg State's colors

The Pitt State football program began in 1908 under head coach Albert McLeland. Since that time, the program has produced the most wins in NCAA Division II history. It has been National Champions on four occasions; 1957, 1961, 1991 and 2011. Pittsburg State defeated Wayne State University, MI, 35-21 to claim its most recent national championship in 2011. During the 2004 season, the Gorillas finished 14–1, losing 31–36 to Valdosta State University in the NCAA Division II National Football Championship.

Pittsburg State has won, outright or shared, a total of 27 conference championships during the 96-year history of its intercollegiate program, including 13 conference titles in the last 19 seasons under Coach Chuck Broyles PSU reached the Division II National Championship game in 2004, 1995, and 1992. Its games with fellow MIAA Division II powerhouse Northwest Missouri State University were played at Arrowhead Stadium in Kansas City, Missouri, in the Fall Classic at Arrowhead from 2002 until 2013. 26,695 attended the 2002 game—the most of any Division II game.

== National championships ==
=== Team ===
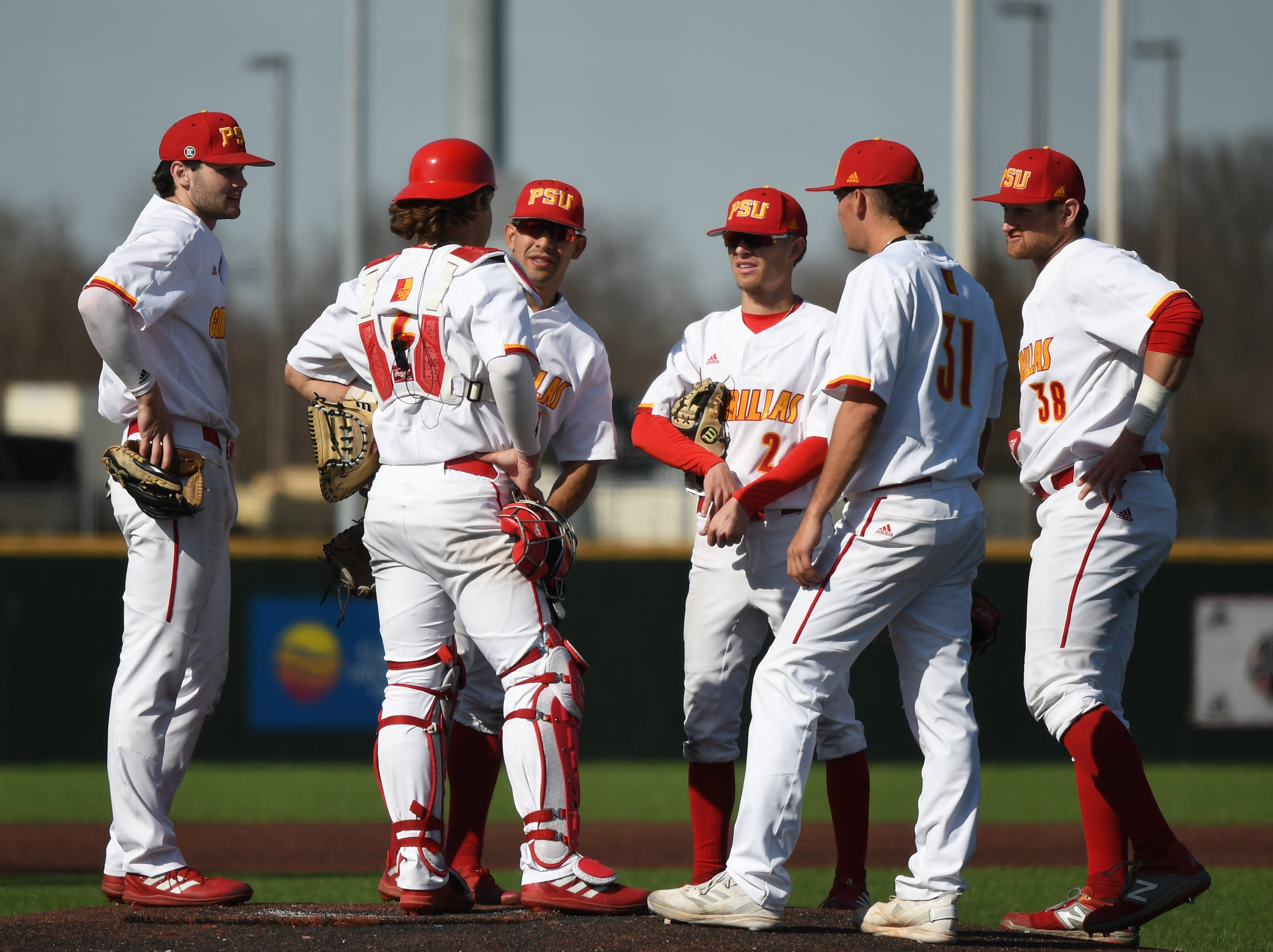
The Gorillas baseball team conducts a mound visit during a game in 2022

Sport	Association	Division	Year	Opponent/Runner-up	Score/Points
Football (2)	NCAA	Division II	1991	Jacksonville State*	23-6
Football (2)	NCAA	Division II	2011	Wayne State (MI)	35-21
Men's indoor track and field (5)	NCAA	Division II	2018	Tiffin	49-48 (+1)
Men's indoor track and field (5)	NCAA	Division II	2023	Adams State	86-42 (+44)
Men's indoor track and field (5)	NCAA	Division II	2024	Grand Valley State	69-56.5 (+12.5)
Men's indoor track and field (5)	NCAA	Division II	2025	Grand Valley State	76-61.5 (+14.5)
Men's indoor track and field (5)	NCAA	Division II	2026	Grand Valley State	75.5-51 (+24.5)
Men's outdoor track and field (4)	NCAA	Division II	2022	West Texas A&M	70–61 (+9)
Men's outdoor track and field (4)	NCAA	Division II	2023	West Texas A&M	62–47 (+15)
Men's outdoor track and field (4)	NCAA	Division II	2024	West Texas A&M	78–64 (+14)
Men's outdoor track and field (4)	NCAA	Division II	2025	West Texas A&M	111-66 (+45)
Women's indoor track and field (2)	NCAA	Division II	2025	Minnesota State	63–58 (+5)
Women's indoor track and field (2)	NCAA	Division II	2026	West Texas A&M	69.5–55 (+10.5)
Women's outdoor track and field (2)	NCAA	Division II	2016	St. Augustine's	52–51 (+1)
Women's outdoor track and field (2)	NCAA	Division II	2024	Adams State	100–72 (+28)

- Team now plays in Division I FBS

== Mascot ==
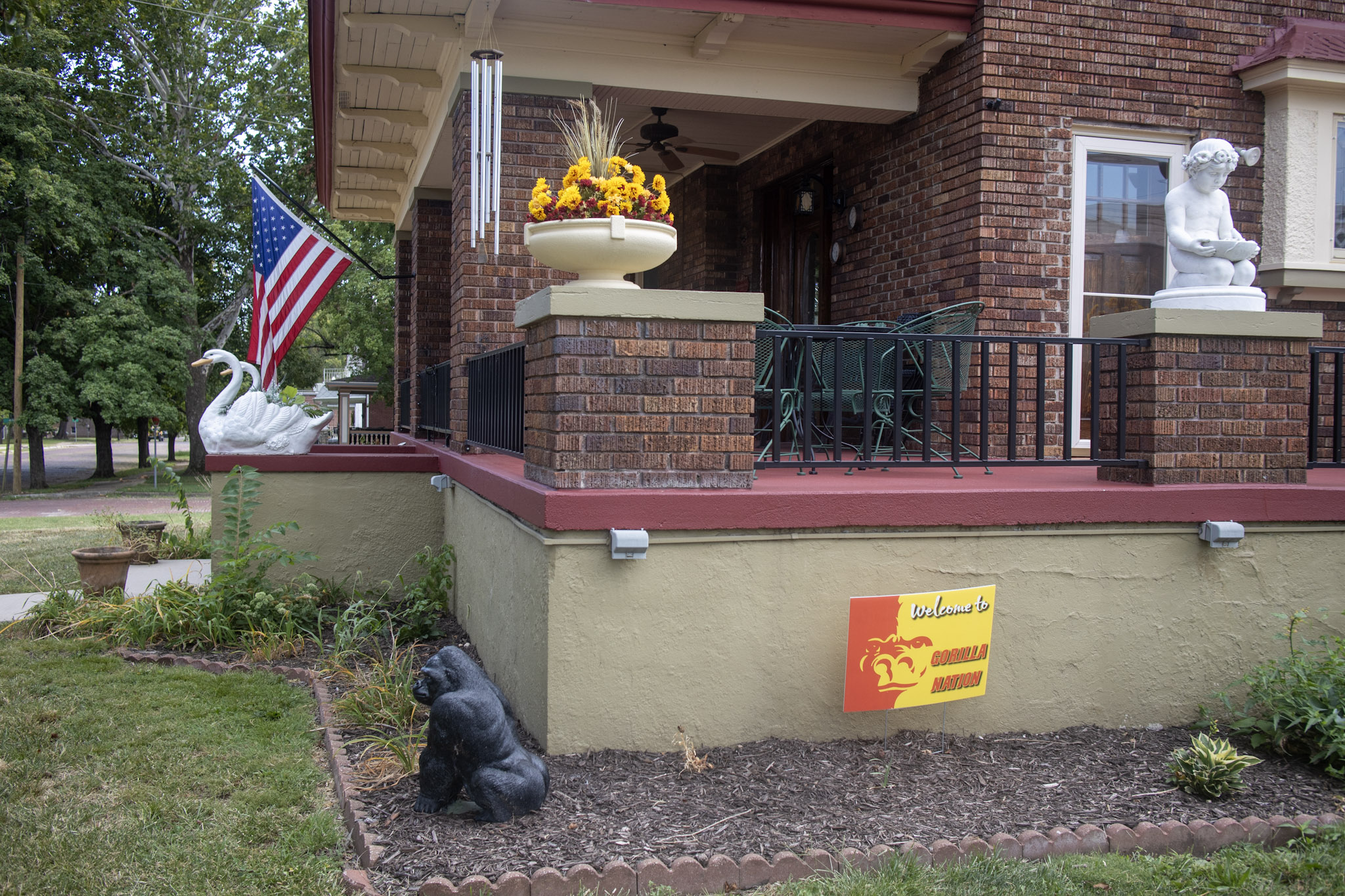
Pittsburg Gorillas lawn sign in Fort Scott, Kansas, August 2023.

The official mascot of Pitt State Athletic teams is Gus the Gorilla, designed in by L. Michael Hailey in 1985. Pitt State is the only college in the nation with the Gorilla as its official mascot for its men's and women's teams.

== Notable alumni ==
- John Brown, NFL wide receiver, Buffalo Bills
- Eldon Danenhauer, Offensive tackle for the Denver Broncos.
- Ralph Earhart, former Green Bay Packers halfback
- Dallis Flowers, current NFL cornerback for the San Francisco 49ers
- Dennis Franchione, former head football coach of Texas State University (and former coach of Pittsburg State)
- Kendall Gammon, former Kansas City Chiefs longsnapper (currently employed by Pittsburg State)
- Don Gutteridge, Major League Baseball player and Manager
- Sherm Lollar, Major League Baseball player
- Ronald Moore, former NFL running back, 1992 Harlon Hill Trophy winner
- Brian Moorman, former NFL punter, Buffalo Bills
- Germaine Race, former NFL running back, San Diego Chargers
