= NCAA Women's Indoor Track and Field Championship =

United States athletics tournament

The NCAA Women's Indoor Track and Field Championship refers to one of three annual collegiate indoor track and field competitions for women organised by the National Collegiate Athletic Association for athletes from institutions that make up its three divisions: NCAA Division I, II, and III. In each event athlete's individual performances earn points for their institution and the team with the most points receives the NCAA team title in track and field.

- NCAA Women's Division I Indoor Track and Field Championships
- NCAA Women's Division II Indoor Track and Field Championships
- NCAA Women's Division III Indoor Track and Field Championships

A separate NCAA men's competition is also held.

== See also ==
- AIAW Intercollegiate Women's Indoor Track and Field Champions
- NCAA Women's Outdoor Track and Field Championship
- NCAA Men's Indoor Track and Field Championship
- NCAA Men's Outdoor Track and Field Championship
