= NCAA Men's Outdoor Track and Field Championship =

Track and Field Championships

The NCAA Men's Outdoor Track and Field Championship refers to one of three annual collegiate outdoor track and field competitions for men organised by the National Collegiate Athletic Association (NCAA) for athletes from institutions that make up its three divisions: Division I, II, and III. In each event athlete's individual performances earn points for their institution and the team with the most points receives the NCAA team title in track and field.

- NCAA Division I Men's Outdoor Track and Field Championships
- NCAA Division II Men's Outdoor Track and Field Championships
- NCAA Division III Men's Outdoor Track and Field Championships

A separate NCAA women's competition is also held.

== See also ==
- NCAA Men's Indoor Track and Field Championship
- NCAA Women's Indoor Track and Field Championship
- NCAA Women's Outdoor Track and Field Championship
