= NCAA Division III women's indoor track and field championships =

American collegiate track and field tournament

- Association: NCAA
- Sport: College indoor track and field
- Founded: 1983; 43 years ago
- Division: Division III
- Country: United States
- Most recent champion: Washington–St. Louis (2nd)
- Most titles: Wisconsin–Oshkosh (9)
- Broadcaster: ESPNU
- Website: NCAA.com

The NCAA Division III women's indoor track and field championships are contested at the annual track meet hosted by the National Collegiate Athletic Association to determine the individual and team national champions of women's collegiate indoor track and field among its Division III members in the United States. It has been held annually since 1983.

These championships are held concurrently with the men's Division III indoor championships and are separate from the women's Division III outdoor championships held during the spring.

The Wisconsin–Oshkosh Titans have been the most successful program, with 9 team titles.

Washington–St. Louis are the reigning national champions, winning their second national title in 2026.

== Format ==
Athletes' performances in individual championships earn points for their institutions and the team with the most points receives the NCAA team title in track and field.

== Events ==
=== Track events ===
- Sprint events
  - 60 meter dash
  - 200 meter dash
  - 400 meter dash
- Distance events
  - 800 meter run
  - Mile run
  - 3,000 meter run
  - 5,000 meter run
- Hurdle Events
  - 60 meter high hurdles
- Relay events
  - 1,600 meter relay
  - Distance medley relay

=== Field events ===
- Jumping events
  - High jump
  - Pole vault
  - Long jump
  - Triple jump
- Throwing events
  - Shot put
  - Weight throw
- Multi-events
  - Pentathlon

=== Discontinued events ===
- Sprint events
  - 55 meter dash (1985–2011)
- Distance events
  - 1,500 meter run (1985–2004)
- Hurdle Events
  - 55 meter high hurdles (1985–2011)

== Summary ==
NCAA Division III Women's Indoor Track and Field Championships
| Year | Site | Championship Results | | | |
| Year | Site | Winner | Points | Runners-up | Points |
|---|---|---|---|---|---|
| 1985; Details | Lewiston, ME (Bates) | UMass Boston | 50 | Cortland State | 41 |
| 1986; Details | St. Paul, MN (Saint Thomas) | UMass Boston (2) | 47 | Springfield | 36 |
| 1987; Details | Chicago, IL (Chicago) | UMass Boston (3) | 56 | Christopher Newport | 52 |
| 1988; Details | Northampton, MA (Smith) | Christopher Newport | 66 | UMass Boston | 39 |
| 1989; Details | Lewiston, ME (Bates) | Christopher Newport (2) | 50 | Rochester (NY) | 31 |
| 1990; Details | Northampton, MA (Smith) | Christopher Newport (3) | 59 | Wisconsin–Oshkosh | 43 |
| 1991; Details | Middletown, CT (Wesleyan) | Cortland | 50 | Wisconsin–Oshkosh | 44½ |
| 1992; Details | Stevens Point, WI (UW–Stevens Point) | Christopher Newport (4) | 46 | Wisconsin–Oshkosh | 41 |
| 1993; Details | Lewiston, ME (Bates) | Lincoln (PA) | 36 | Wisconsin–La Crosse | 27 |
| 1994; Details | Oshkosh, WI (UW–Oshkosh) | Wisconsin–Oshkosh | 41 | Christopher Newport | 36 |
| 1995; Details | Ada, OH (Ohio Northern) | Wisconsin–Oshkosh (2) | 42 | Cortland State | 26 |
| 1996; Details | Northampton, MA (Smith) | Wisconsin–Oshkosh (3) | 41 | Lincoln (PA) | 29 |
| 1997; Details | Oshkosh, WI (UW–Oshkosh) | Christopher Newport (5) | 47 | CCNY | 36 |
| 1998; Details | Waltham, MA (Brandeis) | Christopher Newport (6) | 31 | Wheaton (MA) | 28 |
| 1999; Details | Ada, OH (Ohio Northern) | Wheaton (MA) | 43 | Wisconsin–La Crosse | 38 |
| 2000; Details | Bloomington, IL (Illinois Wesleyan) | Wheaton (MA) (2) | 47 | Lincoln (PA) | 41 |
| 2001; Details | Oshkosh, WI (UW–Oshkosh) | Wheaton (MA) (3) | 63 | Wisconsin–La Crosse | 35 |
| 2002; Details | Ada, OH (Ohio Northern) | Wheaton (MA) (4) | 65½ | Wisconsin–Oshkosh | 37 |
| 2003; Details | Greencastle, IN (DePauw) | Wheaton (MA) (5) | 54 | Lehman | 48 |
| 2004; Details | Whitewater, WI (UW–Whitewater) | Wisconsin–Oshkosh (4) | 56½ | Wheaton (MA) | 28 |
| 2005; Details | Bloomington, IL (Illinois Wesleyan) | Wisconsin–Oshkosh (5) | 36 | Wartburg | 32 |
| 2006; Details | Northfield, MN (St. Olaf) | Wisconsin–Oshkosh (6) | 44 | Williams | 38 |
| 2007; Details | Terre Haute, IN (Rose–Hulman) | Williams | 42 | CCNY | 35 |
| 2008; Details | Ada, OH (Ohio Northern) | Illinois Wesleyan | 30 | Wartburg | 27 |
| 2009; Details | Terre Haute, IN (Rose–Hulman) | Wartburg | 51 | Wisconsin–La Crosse | 41½ |
| 2010; Details | Greencastle, IN (DePauw) | Wartburg (2) | 33 | Wisconsin–Oshkosh | 29 |
| 2011; Details | Bexley, OH (Capital) | Wisconsin–Oshkosh (7) | 46½ | Wartburg | 44 |
| 2012; Details | Grinnell, IA (Grinnell) | Wartburg (3) | 99 | Wisconsin–Oshkosh | 48 |
| 2013; Details | Naperville, IL (North Central) | Wisconsin–Oshkosh (8) | 56 | Illinois College | 32 |
| 2014; Details | Lincoln, NE | Wisconsin–Oshkosh (9) | 67 | Wisconsin–La Crosse | 65 |
| 2015; Details | Winston-Salem, NC (Roanoke) | Wisconsin–La Crosse | 55 | Wisconsin–Oshkosh | 49 |
| 2016; Details | Grinnell, IA (Grinnell) | Baldwin Wallace | 42.2 | Illinois Wesleyan | 36 |
| 2017; Details | Naperville, IL (North Centra]) | Washington–St. Louis | 44 | Ithaca | 41¼ |
| 2018; Details | Birmingham, AL (Birmingham–Southern) | UMass Boston (4) | 46 | Williams | 37 |
| 2019; Details | Boston, MA (UMass Boston) | Williams (2) | 42 | Washington-St. Louis | 40 |
| 2020 | Cancelled due to the COVID-19 pandemic in the United States | | | | |
| 2021 | Cancelled due to the COVID-19 pandemic in the United States | | | | |
| 2022; Details | Winston-Salem, NC | Loras | 59 | Wisconsin–La Crosse | 44 |
| 2023; Details | Birmingham, AL (Birmingham–Southern) | Wisconsin–La Crosse (2) | 59.5 | Washington–St. Louis | 54 |
| 2024; Details | Virginia Beach, VA (Norfolk State) | Loras | 51 | Washington–St. Louis | 49 |
| 2025; Details | Rochester, NY (Nazareth) | MIT | 49 | Washington–St. Louis | 45½ |
| 2026; Details | Birmingham, AL (Birmingham–Southern) | Washington–St. Louis (2) | 54 | Williams | 44 |

== Champions ==
=== Team titles ===
==== Active programs ====
| Team | Titles | Years |
|---|---|---|
| Wisconsin–Oshkosh | 9 | 1994, 1995, 1996, 2004, 2005, 2006, 2011, 2013, 2014 |
| Christopher Newport | 6 | 1988, 1989, 1990, 1992, 1997, 1998 |
| Wheaton (MA) | 5 | 1999, 2000, 2001, 2002, 2003 |
| UMass Boston | 4 | 1985, 1986, 1987, 2018 |
| Wartburg | 3 | 2009, 2010, 2012 |
| Washington University | 2 | 2017, 2026 |
| Loras | 2 | 2022, 2024 |
| Wisconsin–La Crosse | 2 | 2015, 2023 |
| Williams | 2 | 2007, 2019 |
| MIT | 1 | 2025 |
| Baldwin Wallace | 1 | 2016 |
| Illinois Wesleyan | 1 | 2008 |
| Cortland | 1 | 1991 |

==== Former programs ====
| Team | Titles | Years |
|---|---|---|
| Lincoln (PA) | 1 | 1993 |

== Championship records ==
| Event | Record | Athlete | School | Nationality | Date | Place | Ref |
|---|---|---|---|---|---|---|---|
| 400 m | 54.41 | Sara Schermerhorn | Hope College | United States | 13 March 2026 | Birmingham, Alabama | |
| 400 m | 54.41 | Grace Yarkosky | State University of New York at Plattsburgh | United States | 13 March 2026 | Birmingham, Alabama | |
| 5000 m | 16:15.06 | Kassie Parker | Loras | United States | 12 March 2022 | Winston-Salem, North Carolina | |
| Pole vault | 4.28 m | Katherine Pitman | Ithaca | United States | 9 March 2018 | Birmingham, Alabama | |
| Long jump | 6.25 m | Chloe Hein | Centre College | United States | 13 March 2026 | Birmingham, Alabama | |
| Distance medley relay | 11:29.59 | Lauren Raley; Kylie Spytek; Kalena Riemer; Lucinda Laughlin | Washington University Bears | United States | 13 March 2026 | Birmingham, Alabama | |

== See also ==
- NCAA Women's Indoor Track and Field Championship (Division I, Division II)
- AIAW Intercollegiate Women's Indoor Track and Field Champions
- NAIA Women's Indoor Track and Field Championship
- NCAA Men's Indoor Track and Field Championship (Division I, Division II, Division III)
- NCAA Women's Outdoor Track and Field Championship (Division I, Division II, Division III)
- NCAA Men's Outdoor Track and Field Championship (Division I, Division II, Division III)
