= NCAA Men's Indoor Track and Field Championship =

The NCAA Men's Indoor Track and Field Championship refers to one of three annual collegiate indoor track and field competitions for men organised by the National Collegiate Athletic Association for athletes from institutions that make up its three divisions: Division I, II, and III. In each event athlete's individual performances earn points for their institution and the team with the most points receives the NCAA team title in track and field.

- NCAA Men's Division I Indoor Track and Field Championships
- NCAA Men's Division II Indoor Track and Field Championships
- NCAA Men's Division III Indoor Track and Field Championships

A separate NCAA Women's competition is also held.

== See also ==
- NCAA Men's Outdoor Track and Field Championship
- NCAA Women's Indoor Track and Field Championship
- NCAA Women's Outdoor Track and Field Championship
