= Lincoln Blue Tigers =

- University: Lincoln University
- Conferences: GLVC; Great Lakes Valley Conference Division
- NCAA: Division II
- Athletic director: Tim Abney
- Location: Jefferson City, Missouri
- Varsity teams: 14 (7 men’s, 7 women’s) (7 men's, 7 women's)
- Football stadium: Dwight T. Reed Stadium
- Basketball arena: Jason Gymnasium
- Baseball stadium: LU Baseball Field
- Mascot: Stripes
- Nickname: Blue Tigers
- Fight song: "LU Fight Song"
- Colors: Navy blue and white
- Website: lubluetigers.com

The Lincoln Blue Tigers are the athletic teams that represent Lincoln University, located in Jefferson City, Missouri, in intercollegiate sports as a member of the NCAA Division II ranks, primarily competing in the Great Lakes Valley Conference (GLVC) since the 2024–25 academic year. The Blue Tigers previously competed in the Heartland Conference (1999–2010) and the Mid-America Intercollegiate Athletics Association (1970–1999 and 2010–2024).

== Sports sponsored ==
Lincoln sponsors fourteen intercollegiate varsity sports:

Men's sports	Women's sports
Baseball	Basketball
Basketball	Cross country
Football	Golf
Golf	Soccer
Soccer	Softball
Track and field^{†}	Track and field^{†}
† – Track and field includes both indoor and outdoor

=== Football ===
The Blue Tigers sponsored football from their first tenure in the MIAA until after the 1989 fall season, before revitalizing it and rejoined the MIAA in 2010.

=== Women's track and field ===
The Lincoln Blue Tigers women's track and field team made NCAA Division II history by winning the Outdoor Track and Field Championships five consecutive times, from 2003 to 2007. They won a sixth title in 2009 and a seventh in 2014.

== Former programs ==
In May 2016 Lincoln dropped its baseball and women's tennis programs. In June 2020 due to the COVID-19 pandemic Lincoln dropped its women's bowling program.

== National championships ==
The Blue Tigers have won fourteen NCAA Division II team championships.

=== Team ===
MIAA logo in Lincoln's colors

Association	Division	Sport	Year	Opponent/Runner-up	Score
NCAA (14)	Division II (14)	Women's Indoor Track and Field (5)	2004	Adams State	62–58 (+4)
NCAA (14)	Division II (14)	Women's Indoor Track and Field (5)	2006	Abilene Christian	87–50 1/3 (+36 2/3)
NCAA (14)	Division II (14)	Women's Indoor Track and Field (5)	2009	Grand Valley State	100 1/2–48 (+52 1/2)
NCAA (14)	Division II (14)	Women's Indoor Track and Field (5)	2010	Ashland; Grand Valley State	56–47 (+9)
NCAA (14)	Division II (14)	Women's Indoor Track and Field (5)	2016	Hillsdale	60–58 (+2)
NCAA (14)	Division II (14)	Women's Outdoor Track and Field (9)	2003	St. Augustine's	98–67 (+31)
NCAA (14)	Division II (14)	Women's Outdoor Track and Field (9)	2004	Adams State	85–81 (+4)
NCAA (14)	Division II (14)	Women's Outdoor Track and Field (9)	2005	Cal State Bakersfield	108–53 (+55)
NCAA (14)	Division II (14)	Women's Outdoor Track and Field (9)	2006	Abilene Christian	93–86 (+7)
NCAA (14)	Division II (14)	Women's Outdoor Track and Field (9)	2007	Abilene Christian	82 1/2–69 (+13 1/2)
NCAA (14)	Division II (14)	Women's Outdoor Track and Field (9)	2009	Adams State	85–82 (+3)
NCAA (14)	Division II (14)	Women's Outdoor Track and Field (9)	2014	Johnson C. Smith	64–59 (+5)
NCAA (14)	Division II (14)	Women's Outdoor Track and Field (9)	2018	Saint Augustine's	60–48 1/2 (+11 1/2)
NCAA (14)	Division II (14)	Women's Outdoor Track and Field (9)	2019	Adams State	64–54 (+10)

== Songs ==
=== Fight song ===
Lincoln University doesn't have a name for their fight song, but it is sung to the tune of "The Washington and Lee Swing".

=== Alma mater ===
Sung to the tune of "Ach, wie ist's möglich dann", an old German folk song published in 1827 and variously credited to Friedrich Wilhelm Kücken or Friedrich Silcher, Lincoln's fight song is called "Lincoln, O, Lincoln". (The West Point and Wake Forest alma maters also use the same tune.)

== Notable alumni ==
- Dusty Decker, Negro league infielder
- Leo Lewis, member of the Canadian Football Hall of Fame
- Zeke Moore, National Football League (NFL) defensive back
- Lemar Parrish, eight-time Pro Bowl NFL defensive back in the 1970s and early 1980s, head coach of the Blue Tiger football team from 2005 to 2008
