= NCAA Division III women's outdoor track and field championships =

American collegiate track and field tournament

- Association: NCAA
- Sport: College track and field
- Founded: 1982; 44 years ago
- Division: Division III
- Country: United States
- Most recent champion: Wisconsin–La Crosse (5)
- Most titles: Wisconsin–Oshkosh (9)
- Broadcaster: ESPNU
- Website: NCAA.com

The NCAA Division III women's outdoor track and field championships are contested at the annual track meet hosted by the National Collegiate Athletic Association to determine the individual and team national champions of women's collegiate track and field among its Division III member programs in the United States. The championships have been held almost every year since 1982.

Athletes' performances in individual championships earn points for their institutions and the team with the most points receives the NCAA team title in track and field.

These championships are separate from the NCAA Division III Women's Indoor Track and Field Championships held during the winter.

Wisconsin–Oshkosh have been the most successful program, with nine national titles.

Wisconsin–La Crosse are the reigning team national champions, winning their fifth title in 2026.

== Results ==
=== Scoring ===
- 1982–1984: the top 12 finishers scored for their team with points being awarded 15, 12, 10, 9, 8, 7, 6, 5, 4, 3, 2, 1.
- 1985–present: the top 8 finishers scored, with points awarded 10, 8, 6, 5, 4, 3, 2, 1. In the place of a tie of two or more people the total points for those accumulated places are added up and divided by the number of people.

=== Team Champions ===
NCAA Division III Women's Outdoor Track and Field Championships
Year	Site	Championship Results			
Year	Site	Winner	Points	Runners-up	Points
1982; Details	Naperville, IL (North Central)	Central (IA)	151	Frostburg State	96
1983; Details	Naperville, IL (North Central)	Wisconsin–La Crosse	156	St. Thomas (MN)	126
1984; Details	Northfield, MN (Carleton)	Wisconsin–La Crosse (2)	185½	Central (IA)	102
1985; Details	Granville, OH (Denison)	Cortland	62	Southern–New Orleans	61
1986; Details	La Crosse, WI (UW–La Crosse)	UMass Boston	52	Wisconsin–La Crosse	49½
1987; Details	Naperville, IL (North Central)	Christopher Newport	80	UMass Boston	58
1988; Details	Northfield, MN (Carleton)	Christopher Newport (2)	95	UMass Boston	66
1989; Details	Naperville, IL (North Central)	Christopher Newport (3)	58	Wisconsin–Oshkosh	51½
1990; Details	Naperville, IL (North Central)	Wisconsin–Oshkosh	75	Cortland State	48
1991; Details	Berea, OH (Baldwin Wallace)	Wisconsin–Oshkosh (2)	66½	Cortland State	56
1992; Details	Waterville, ME (Colby)	Christopher Newport (4)	61	Wisconsin–Oshkosh	47
1993; Details	Berea, OH (Baldwin Wallace)	Lincoln (PA)	57	Wisconsin–La Crosse	52
1994; Details	Naperville, IL (North Central)	Christopher Newport (5)	73	Wisconsin–Oshkosh	53
1995; Details	Northfield, MN (Carleton)	Wisconsin–Oshkosh (3)	58	St. Thomas (MN)	52
1996; Details	Naperville, IL (North Central)	Wisconsin–Oshkosh (4)	69½	Lincoln (PA)	62
1997; Details	La Crosse, WI (UW–La Crosse)	Wisconsin–Oshkosh (5)	59	Wisconsin–La Crosse	38¾
1998; Details	St. Paul, MN (Macalester)	Christopher Newport (6)	59	Wheaton (MA)	50
1999; Details	Berea, OH (Baldwin Wallace)	Lincoln (PA) (2)	54	Wheaton (MA)	48
2000; Details	Naperville, IL (North Central)	Lincoln (PA) (3)	65	Christopher Newport	50
2001; Details	Decatur, IL (Millikin)	Wheaton (MA)	83½	Calvin	49
2002; Details	St. Paul, MN (Macalester)	Wheaton (MA) (2)	67	McMurry	49
2003; Details	Canton, NY (St. Lawrence)	Wheaton (MA) (3)	72	Lehman	52
2004; Details	Decatur, IL (Millikin)	Wisconsin–Oshkosh (6)	57	Calvin	42¼
2005; Details	Waverly, IA (Wartburg)	Wartburg	43	Wisconsin–Oshkosh; Calvin	42
2006; Details	Lisle, IL (Benedictine)	Wisconsin–Oshkosh (7)	52	Williams	42
2007; Details	Oshkosh, WI (UW–Oshkosh)	Wisconsin–Oshkosh (8)	57	Calvin	44½
2008; Details	Oshkosh, WI (UW–Oshkosh)	Illinois Wesleyan; Wisconsin–River Falls	35	Wartburg	34
2009; Details	Marietta, OH (Marietta)	Wartburg (2)	52	Wisconsin–Oshkosh	50
2010; Details	Berea, OH (Baldwin Wallace)	Illinois Wesleyan (2)	54	Wisconsin–Oshkosh	53
2011; Details	Delaware, OH (Ohio Wesleyan)	Wisconsin–Oshkosh (9)	80	Wartburg	59
2012; Details	Claremont, CA (Claremont–MS)	Wartburg (3)	129	Wisconsin–Oshkosh	52
2013; Details	La Crosse, WI (UW–La Crosse)	Wartburg (4)	46	Wisconsin–Oshkosh	43
2014; Details	Delaware, OH (Ohio Wesleyan)	Wartburg (5)	65	Wisconsin–Oshkosh	63
2015; Details	Canton, NY (St. Lawrence)	Wisconsin–La Crosse (3)	73	Wisconsin-Eau Claire	43
2016; Details	Waverly, IA (Wartburg)	Illinois Wesleyan (3)	42	Baldwin Wallace	41
2017; Details	Geneva, OH (The Spire Institute)	Washington University (St. Louis)	56	Ithaca College	37
2018; Details	La Crosse, WI (UW–La Crosse)	George Fox; UMass Boston (2)	44	Washington University (St. Louis)	38
2019; Details	Geneva, OH (NCAC)	Loras	53	Washington University (St. Louis)	49
2020	Cancelled due to the COVID-19 pandemic				
2021; Details	Greensboro, NC	Loras (2)	60	Wisconsin–La Crosse	57
2022; Details	Geneva, OH (NCAC)	Loras (3)	55	Wisconsin–La Crosse	51
2023; Details	Rochester, NY (St. John Fisher)	Wisconsin–La Crosse (4)	67.5	Loras	58
2024; Details	Myrtle Beach, SC (Coastal Carolina)	Washington University (St. Louis) (2)	71	Wisconsin–La Crosse	47.5
2025; Details	Geneva, OH (NCAC)	MIT	56	Washington University (St. Louis)	47
2026; Details	La Crosse, WI (UW–La Crosse)	Wisconsin–La Crosse (5)	53	Washington University (St. Louis)	42

== Champions ==
=== Team titles ===
==== Active programs ====
Team	Titles	Years
Wisconsin–Oshkosh	9	1990, 1991, 1995, 1996, 1997, 2004, 2006, 2007, 2011
Christopher Newport	6	1987, 1988, 1989, 1992, 1994, 1998
Wartburg	5	2005, 2009, 2012, 2013, 2014
Wisconsin–La Crosse	5	1983, 1984, 2015, 2023, 2026
Loras	3	2019, 2021, 2022
Illinois Wesleyan	3	2008*, 2010, 2016
Wheaton (MA)	3	2001, 2002, 2003
Washington University	2	2017, 2024
UMass Boston	2	1986, 2018*
MIT	1	2025
George Fox	1	2018*
Wisconsin–River Falls	1	2008*
Cortland	1	1985
Central (IA)	1	1982

==== Former programs ====
Team	Titles	Years
Lincoln (PA)	3	1993, 1999, 2000

=== Individual titles ===
- List updated through the 2024 Championships; top 10 teams only

Rank	Team	Titles
1	Wisconsin–Oshkosh	52
2	Wisconsin–La Crosse	32
3	Christopher Newport	29
4	Wartburg	26
5	Lincoln (PA)	24
6	Cortland	22
7	St. Thomas (MN)	18
8	Calvin	17
8	Loras Duhawks	17
9	Wheaton (MA)	16
9	UMass Boston	16

- Schools highlighted in italics have reclassified athletics from NCAA Division III.

== Championship records ==
Event	Record	Athlete	University	Date	Meet	Ref.
Track events
100 m	11.49 (+0.5 m/s)	Michelle Kwafo	Coast Guard	27 May 2023	2023 Championships	
200 m	23.43 (+1.5 m/s)	Sydney Radigan	Calvin	23 May 2026	2026 Championships	
400 m	52.81	Wadeline Jonathas	UMass Boston	24 May 2017	2017 Championships	
800 m	2:02.52	Esther Seeland	Messiah	29 May 2021	2021 Championships	
1500 m	4:13.69	Emily Pomainville	SUNY Geneseo	27 May 2021	2021 Championships	
5000 m	15:51.23	Missy Buttry	Wartburg	24 May 2003	2003 Championships	
10,000 m	33:02.53	Kassie Parker	Loras	25 May 2023	2023 Championships	
100 m hurdles	13.28 (+1.6 m/s)	Aryianna Garceau	UMass Boston	23 May 2026	2026 Championships	
400 m hurdles	58.01	Natalia Sawyer	Buffalo State	25 May 2024	2024 Championships	
3000 m steeplechase	10:04.18	Sophie Bull	Calvin	22 May 2026	2026 Championships	
4 × 100 m relay	45.20	Julie Yang; Anika Reiland; Makenna Zak; Lauren Jarrett	Wisconsin–La Crosse	24 May 2025	2025 Championships	
4 × 400 m relay	3:34.32	Tessa Donoghue; Vernick Smith; Jana Bromell; Amber James	Wheaton (Mass.)	24 May 2003	2003 Championships	
Field events
High jump	1.81 m (5-11 1/4)	Kristy Laramee; Maria Megnin	Middlebury; Hartwick	22 May 1999	1999 Championships	
Pole vault	4.22 m (13-10)	Marissa Kalsey	Westminster (Pa.)	25 May 2017	2017 Championships	
Long jump	6.20 m (20-4 1/4)	Skye Morrison	Wartburg	25 May 2012	2012 Championships	
Triple jump	13.215 m (43 ft 4 1/4 in) (+0.7 m/s)	Victoria Kadiri	John Hopkins	27 May 2023	2023 Championships	
Shot put	16.80 m (55-1½)	Alexis Boykin	MIT	23 May 2025	2025 Championships	
Discus throw	55.02 m (180-6)	Kristin Kuehl	Concordia Moorhead	30 May 1992	1992 Championships	
Hammer throw	64.03 m (210-1)	Whitney Simmons	UT Tyler	27 May 2017	2017 Championships	
Javelin throw	55.34 m (181-7)	Christina Scherwin	Moravian	24 May 2003	2003 Championships	
Heptathlon	5372 pts	Emily Lavarnway	SUNY Geneseo	27 May 2021	2021 Championships	

== See also ==
- NCAA track and field championships
  - Women's outdoor (Division I, Division II)
  - Men's outdoor (Division I, Division II, Division III)
  - Women's indoor (Division I, Division II, Division III)
  - Men's indoor (Division I, Division II, Division III)
- NAIA track and field championships
  - Women's outdoor
  - Men's outdoor
  - Women's indoor
  - Men's indoor
- AIAW Intercollegiate Women's Outdoor Track and Field Champions
- Pre-NCAA Outdoor Track and Field Champions
