= Norfolk State Spartans =

Intercollegiate sports teams of Norfolk State University

- University: Norfolk State University
- Conference: Mid-Eastern Athletic Conference (primary); Northeast Conference (baseball)
- NCAA: Division I (FCS)
- Athletic director: Melody Webb
- Location: Norfolk, Virginia
- Varsity teams: 13
- Football stadium: Dick Price Stadium
- Basketball arena: Echols Hall
- Baseball stadium: Marty L. Miller Field
- Nickname: Spartans
- Colors: Green and gold
- Website: nsuspartans.com
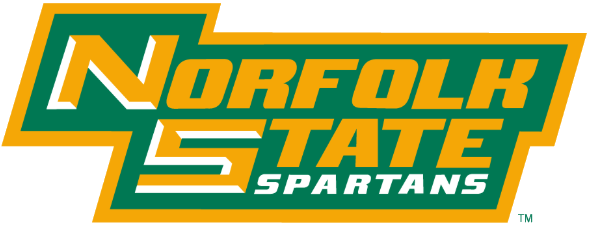

The Norfolk State Spartans refer to the 14 intercollegiate sports teams representing Norfolk State University in Norfolk, Virginia, in intercollegiate athletics, including men and women's basketball, cross country, tennis and track and field; women's sports include bowling, softball, and volleyball; men's-only sports include baseball and football. The Spartans compete in the NCAA Division I Football Championship Subdivision (FCS) and are members of the Mid-Eastern Athletic Conference.

Starting with the next NCAA baseball season in 2023, the baseball team competes as an associate member of the Northeast Conference (NEC). The MEAC merged its baseball league into that of the NEC after the 2022 season.

== Sports sponsored ==
Men's sports	Women's sports
Baseball	Basketball
Basketball	Bowling
Cross Country	Cross Country
Football	Softball
Tennis	Tennis
Track and Field	Track and Field
	Volleyball

=== Baseball ===
The Norfolk State Spartans baseball team qualified for the NCAA Division I baseball tournament for the first time in 2021 by winning the 2021 Mid-Eastern Athletic Conference baseball tournament.

== National championships ==
=== Team ===
Sport	Association	Division	Year	Opponent/Runner-up	Score/Points
Men's Outdoor Track and Field	NCAA (2)	Division II (2)	1973	Lincoln (MO)	54–48
Men's Outdoor Track and Field	NCAA (2)	Division II (2)	1974	Cal Poly San Luis Obispo	51–48.5
