= Rochester Yellowjackets =

Intercollegiate athletics teams of the University of Rochester

- University: University of Rochester
- Nickname: Yellowjackets
- Association: Division III; Division I (squash)
- Conference: University Athletic Association; Liberty League
- Athletic director: George VanderZwaag
- Location: Rochester, New York
- Varsity teams: 23
- Football stadium: Edwin Fauver Stadium
- Basketball arena: Louis Alexander Palestra
- Baseball stadium: Towers Field
- Softball stadium: Southside Field
- Soccer stadium: Edwin Fauver Stadium
- Aquatics center: Speegle-Wilbraham Center
- Lacrosse stadium: Edwin Fauver Stadium
- Golf course: Oak Hill Country Club
- Rowing venue: Genesee Valley Park
- Tennis venue: Lyman Tennis Center
- Outdoor track and field venue: Edwin Fauver Stadium
- Other venues: Field House; Lyman Squash Center
- Colors: Rochester Blue and Dandelion Yellow
- Mascot: Rocky
- Fight song: March, men of Rochester
- Website: uofrathletics.com

The Rochester Yellowjackets comprise the 23 intercollegiate athletic teams that represent the University of Rochester, located in Rochester, New York. All varsity teams compete in the NCAA Division III, except for their men's squash team, which competes in Division I. The Yellowjackets are affiliated with the University Athletic Association (UAA) and the Liberty League. Their mascot is Rocky the Yellowjacket.

== Varsity sports ==
Men's teams	Women's teams
Baseball	Basketball
Basketball	Cross Country
Cross Country	Field Hockey
Football	Lacrosse
Golf	Rowing
Soccer	Soccer
Squash	Softball
Swimming and Diving	Swimming and Diving
Tennis	Tennis
Track and Field^{1}	Track and Field^{1}
	Volleyball
^{1} – includes both indoor and outdoor

== Championships ==
=== NCAA Championships ===
The University of Rochester Yellowjackets have won 4 team national championships and 18 individual national titles:

Division III

==== Team ====
- Women's Soccer (2): 1986, 1987
- Men's Basketball (1): 1990
- Men's Cross Country (1): 1991

==== Individual ====
- 1974 Men's Cross Country Championship (1):
  - David Moller
- 1974 Men's Outdoor Track and Field Championship (2):
  - David Moller (Three Mile Run)
  - Anthony Palumbo (Triple Jump)
- 1983 Men's Tennis Championship (1):
  - Alex Gaeta and Bob Swartout (Doubles)
- 1985 Women's Outdoor Track and Field Championship (1):
  - Renee Schmitt (Heptathlon)
- 1986 Women's Indoor Track and Field Championship (1):
  - Michelle Mazurik (55 Meter Dash)
- 1987 Men's Outdoor Track and Field Championship (1):
  - Tom Tuori (1,500 Meter Run)
- 1988 Women's Indoor Track and Field Championship (1):
  - Josefa Benzoni (1,500 Meter Run)
- 1989 Women's Indoor Track and Field Championship (2):
  - Josefa Benzoni (1,500 Meter Run)
  - Josefa Benzoni (3,000 Meter Run)
- 2006 Men's Golf Championship (1):
  - Stephen Goodridge
- 2017 Women's Indoor Track and Field Championship (1):
  - Kylee Bartlett (Pentathlon)
- 2017 Women's Outdoor Track and Field Championship (1):
  - Kylee Bartlett (Heptathlon)
- 2018 Women's Outdoor Track and Field Championship (1):
  - Kylee Bartlett (Heptathlon)
- 2023 Women's Indoor Track and Field Championship (1):
  - Susan Bansbach, Megan Bell, Kate Isaac, Madeline O'Connell (4x400 Meter Relay)
- 2024 Women's Indoor Track and Field Championship (1):
  - Megan Bell, Nora Chen, Ashley Heffernan, Madeline O'Connell (4x400 Meter Relay)
- 2024 Women's Indoor Track and Field Championship (1):
  - Madeline O'Connell (Pole Vault)
- 2024 Men's Outdoor Track and Field Championship (1):
  - Cole Goodman (Triple Jump)
