= NCAA Division III men's indoor track and field championships =

American collegiate track and field tournament

- Association: NCAA
- Sport: College indoor track and field
- Founded: 1985; 41 years ago
- Division: Division III
- Country: United States
- Most recent champion: Rowan (1st)
- Most titles: Wisconsin–La Crosse (21)
- Broadcaster: ESPNU
- Website: NCAA.com

The NCAA Division III men's indoor track and field championships are contested at the annual track meet hosted by the National Collegiate Athletic Association to determine the individual and team national champions of men's collegiate indoor track and field among its Division III members in the United States.

These championships are held concurrently with the women's Division III indoor championships and are separate from the men's Division III outdoor championships held during the spring.

Wisconsin–La Crosse have been the most successful program in the events history, with 21 overall team titles.

Rowan are the defending national champions, winning their first title in 2026.

== Format ==
Athlete's individual performances earn points for their institution and the team with the most points receives the NCAA team title in track and field.

=== Track events ===
- Sprint events
  - 60 meter dash
  - 200 meter dash
  - 400 meter dash
- Distance events
  - 800 meter run
  - Mile run
  - 3,000 meter run
  - 5,000 meter run
- Hurdle Events
  - 60 meter high hurdles
- Relay events
  - 1,600 meter relay
  - Distance medley relay

=== Field events ===
- Jumping events
  - High jump
  - Pole vault]
  - Long jump
  - Triple jump
- Throwing events
  - Shot put
  - Weight throw
- Multi-events
  - Heptathlon

=== Discontinued events ===
- Sprint events
  - 55 meter dash (1985–2011)
- Hurdle Events
  - 55 meter high hurdles(1985–2011)
  - 1,500 meter run (1985–2004)
- Multi-events
  - Pentathlon (2009–2011)

== Results ==
NCAA Division III Men's Indoor Track and Field Championships
Year	Site	Championship Results			
Year	Site	Winner	Points	Runners-up	Points
1985	Lewiston, ME (Bates)	St. Thomas (MN)	38	Lincoln (PA)	34
1986	St. Paul, MN (Saint Thomas)	Frostburg State	38	Mount Union	34
1987	Chicago, IL (Chicago)	Wisconsin–La Crosse	44½	St. Lawrence	43
1988	Northampton, MA (Smith)	Wisconsin–La Crosse (2)	36	St. Lawrence	30
1989	Lewiston, ME (Bates)	North Central (IL)	66½	Lincoln (PA)	38
1990	Northampton, MA (Smith)	Lincoln (PA	36	MIT	30½
1991	Middletown, CT (Wesleyan)	Wisconsin–La Crosse (3)	58	Lincoln (PA)	47½
1992	Stevens Point, WI (UW–Stevens Point)	Wisconsin–La Crosse (4)	57	Lincoln (PA)	49
1993	Lewiston, ME (Bates)	Wisconsin–La Crosse (5)	70	Lincoln (PA)	48
1994	Oshkosh, WI (UW–Oshkosh)	Wisconsin–La Crosse (6)	50	Nebraska Wesleyan	42
1995	Ada, OH (Ohio Northern)	Lincoln (PA) (2)	56	Albany	32
1996	Northampton, MA (Smith)	Lincoln (PA) (3)	58	Mount Union	42
1997	Oshkosh, WI (UW–Oshkosh)	Wisconsin–La Crosse (7)	44	Lincoln (PA)	41
1998	Waltham, MA (Brandeis)	Lincoln (PA) (4)	53	Mount Union	48
1999	Ada, OH (Ohio Northern)	Lincoln (PA) (5)	60	Wisconsin–Oshkosh	37
2000	Bloomington, IL (Illinois Wesleyan)	Lincoln (PA) (6)	59	North Central (IL)	40
2001	Oshkosh, WI (UW–Oshkosh)	Wisconsin–La Crosse (8)	58	Wisconsin–Oshkosh	44
2002	Ada, OH (Ohio Northern)	Wisconsin–La Crosse (9)	54	Lincoln (PA)	48
2003	Greencastle, IN (DePauw)	Wisconsin–La Crosse (10)	71	Wisconsin–Oshkosh	34
2004	Whitewater, WI (UW–Whitewater)	Wisconsin–La Crosse (11)	70	Lincoln (PA); Wisconsin–Whitewater	29
2005	Bloomington, IL (Illinois Wesleyan)	Wisconsin–La Crosse (12)	53	Lincoln (PA)	38
2006	Northfield, MN (St. Olaf)	Wisconsin–La Crosse (13)	78	Lincoln (PA)	31
2007	Terre Haute, IN (Rose–Hulman)	Lincoln (PA) (7)	59	Wisconsin–La Crosse	48
2008	Ada, OH (Ohio Northern)	Wisconsin–La Crosse (14)	43	Monmouth (IL)	33
2009	Terre Haute, IN (Rose–Hulman)	Wisconsin–La Crosse (15); Wisconsin–Oshkosh	32	Whitworth	24
2010	Greencastle, IN (DePauw)	North Central (IL) (2)	52⅓	Wisconsin–Stevens Point	34
2011	Bexley, OH (Capital)	North Central (IL) (3)	45	Central (IA)	44
2012	Grinnell, IA (Grinnell)	North Central (IL) (4)	48	Wisconsin–Eau Claire	37
2013	Naperville, IL (North Central)	Wisconsin–La Crosse (16)	74	Wisconsin–Oshkosh	40
2014	Lincoln, NE	Wisconsin–La Crosse (17)	63½	Wisconsin–Eau Claire	48
2015	Winston-Salem, NC (Roanoke)	Wisconsin–Eau Claire	62	Wisconsin–La Crosse	60
2016	Grinnell, IA (Grinnell)	Wisconsin–Eau Claire (2)	53	Wisconsin–La Crosse	49
2017	Naperville, IL (North Centra)	North Central (IL) (5); Wisconsin–La Crosse (18)	34	Wisconsin–Whitewater	30
2018	Birmingham, AL (Birmingham–Southern)	Mount Union	41	North Central (IL)	40
2019	Boston, MA	North Central (IL) (6)	55	Mount Union	39
2020	Cancelled due to the COVID-19 pandemic in the United States				
2021	Cancelled due to the COVID-19 pandemic in the United States				
2022	Winston-Salem, NC	Washington-St. Louis; Wisconsin–Eau Claire (3)	35	Williams	32
2023	Birmingham, AL (Birmingham–Southern)	Wisconsin-La Crosse (19)	35	MIT	34.5
2024	Virginia Beach, VA (Norfolk State)	Wisconsin-La Crosse (20)	74	Wisconsin–Eau Claire	52
2025	Rochester, NY (Nazareth)	Wisconsin-La Crosse (21)	84	Wisconsin-Oshkosh	39
2026	Birmingham, AL (Birmingham–Southern)	Rowan	75	Wisconsin-La Crosse	74

== Champions ==
=== Team titles ===
==== Active programs ====
Team	Titles	Years
Wisconsin–La Crosse	21	1987, 1988, 1991, 1992, 1993, 1994, 1997, 2001, 2002, 2003, 2004, 2005, 2006, 2008, 2009*, 2013, 2014, 2017*, 2023, 2024, 2025
North Central (IL)	6	1989, 2010, 2011, 2012, 2017*, 2019
Wisconsin–Eau Claire	3	2015, 2016, 2022*
Mount Union	1	2018
Rowan	1	2026
Washington University	1	2022*
Wisconsin–Oshkosh	1	2009*

==== Former programs ====
Team	Titles	Years
Lincoln (PA)	7	1990, 1995, 1996, 1998, 1999, 2000, 2007
St. Thomas (MN)	1	1985
Frostburg State	1	1986

== See also ==
- NCAA Men's Indoor Track and Field Championships (Division I, Division II)
- NAIA Men's Indoor Track and Field Championship
- Pre-NCAA Outdoor Track and Field Champions
- NCAA Women's Indoor Track and Field Championships (Division I, Division II, Division III)
- NCAA Men's Outdoor Track and Field Championships (Division I, Division II, Division III)
- NCAA Women's Outdoor Track and Field Championships (Division I, Division II, Division III)
