= MIT Engineers =

MIT's intercollegiate sports teams

- University: Massachusetts Institute of Technology
- Nickname: Engineers
- NCAA: Division III (main); Division I (women's crew & men's water polo)
- Conference: NEWMAC (primary) List: Collegiate Water Polo Association (men's water polo); Eastern Association of Women's Rowing Colleges (women's crew); Eastern Association of Rowing Colleges (men's crew); Mid-Atlantic Squash Conference (men's squash); New England Intercollegiate Sailing Association (sailing); United Volleyball Conference (men's volleyball)
- Athletic director: Dr. G. Anthony Grant
- Location: Cambridge, Massachusetts
- Varsity teams: 33
- Football stadium: Henry G. Steinbrenner '27 Stadium
- Basketball arena: Rockwell Cage
- Baseball stadium: Fran O'Brien Field
- Softball stadium: Briggs Field
- Soccer stadium: Steinbrenner Stadium
- Lacrosse stadium: Roberts Field
- Rowing venue: Richard J. Resch Boathouse
- Sailing venue: Walter C. Wood Sailing Pavilion
- Colors: Cardinal red and steel gray
- Mascot: Tim the Beaver
- Fight song: The Beaver Call
- Website: mitathletics.com
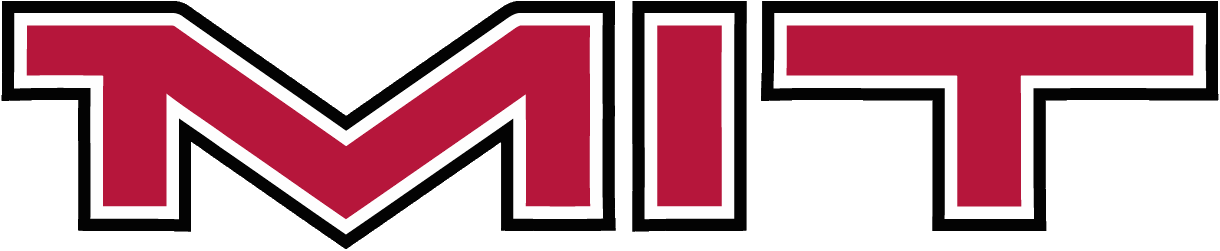

The Massachusetts Institute of Technology's intercollegiate sports teams, called the MIT Engineers, compete mostly in NCAA Division III. MIT has won 22 Team National Championships and 42 Individual National Championships. MIT is the all-time Division III leader in producing Academic All-Americans (302) and ranks second across all NCAA Divisions. MIT athletes have won 22 Elite 90 awards, ranking MIT first among NCAA Division III programs and second among all divisions. Most of the school's sports compete in the New England Women's and Men's Athletic Conference (NEWMAC), with sports not sponsored by the NEWMAC housed in several other conferences. Men's volleyball competes in the single-sport United Volleyball Conference.

One MIT sport, women's rowing, competes in Division I in the Patriot League. Men's water polo, a sport in which the NCAA holds a single national championship for all three of its divisions, competes in the Collegiate Water Polo Association (CWPA) alongside Division I and Division II members. Three sports compete outside NCAA governance: men's rowing competes in the Eastern Association of Rowing Colleges (EARC), sailing in the New England Intercollegiate Sailing Association of ICSA and squash in the College Squash Association. In April 2009, budget cuts led to MIT's eliminating eight of its 41 sports, including the mixed men's and women's teams in alpine skiing and pistol; separate teams for men and women in ice hockey and gymnastics; and men's programs in golf and wrestling.

== Varsity sports ==
| Men's sports | Women's sports |
|---|---|
| Baseball | |
| Basketball | Basketball |
| Crew-Heavyweight | Crew-Openweight |
| Crew-Lightweight | Crew-Lightweight |
| Cross country | Cross country |
| | Field Hockey |
| Football | |
| Lacrosse | Lacrosse |
| Rifle | Rifle |
| Soccer | Soccer |
| | Softball |
| Squash | |
| Swimming and diving | Swimming and diving |
| Tennis | Tennis |
| Track and field^{1} | Track and field^{1} |
| Volleyball | Volleyball |
| Water polo | |
Co-ed sports
Fencing – Sailing
^{1} – includes both indoor and outdoor

== Mascot ==
The beaver, "nature's engineer", was adopted as mascot at the annual dinner of the Technology Club of New York on January 17, 1914 by a group of MIT alumni. The late President Richard Maclaurin formally accepted the proposal, and at this dinner a group of beavers shown in natural surroundings was presented to the Institute. Lester Gardner, a member of the Class of 1898, provided the following justification: "The beaver not only typifies the Tech, but his habits are particularly our own. The beaver is noted for his engineering and mechanical skills and habits of industry. His habits are nocturnal. He does his best work in the dark."

The beaver has since been nicknamed Tim the Beaver, Tim being MIT spelled backwards.

== Nickname and song ==
The initial MIT football team was nicknamed the Techmen. After being discontinued in 1901 and self-reinstated by a group of students in 1978, the team called themselves the Engineers, which then become tradition until now. The team also revived the old fighting song, now dubbed as "The Beaver Calls". The lyric reads:

I'm a beaver, you're a beaver, we are beavers all.
And when we get together, we do the beaver call.
e to the u, du / dx
e to the x, dx
Cosine, secant, tangent, sine;
3.14159
integral, radical, mu dv
Slipstick, slide rule, MIT!
GO TECH!

== NCAA championships ==
=== Team ===
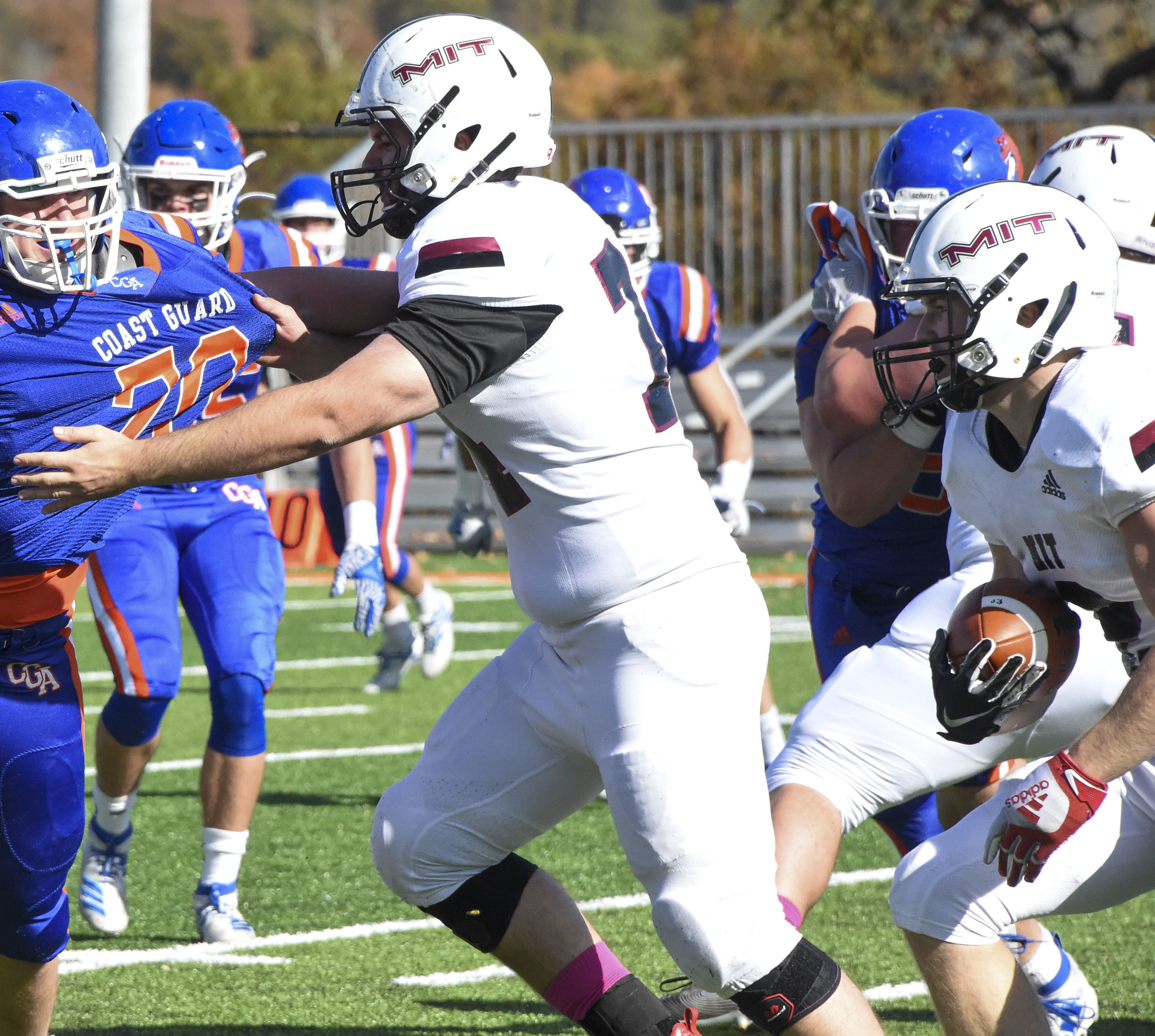
A football game between MIT and the United States Coast Guard Academy in 2019

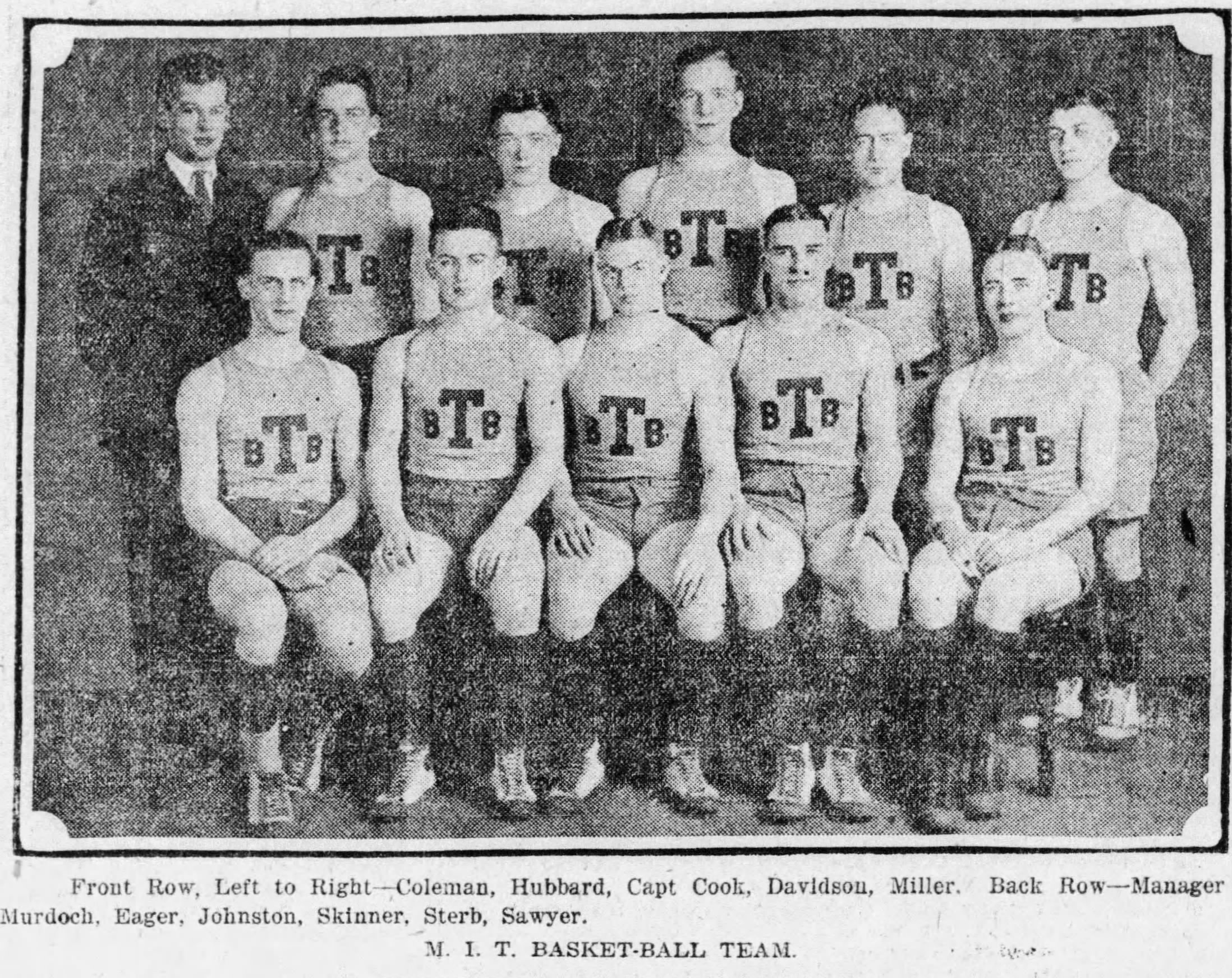
MIT basketball team for the 1922–23 season

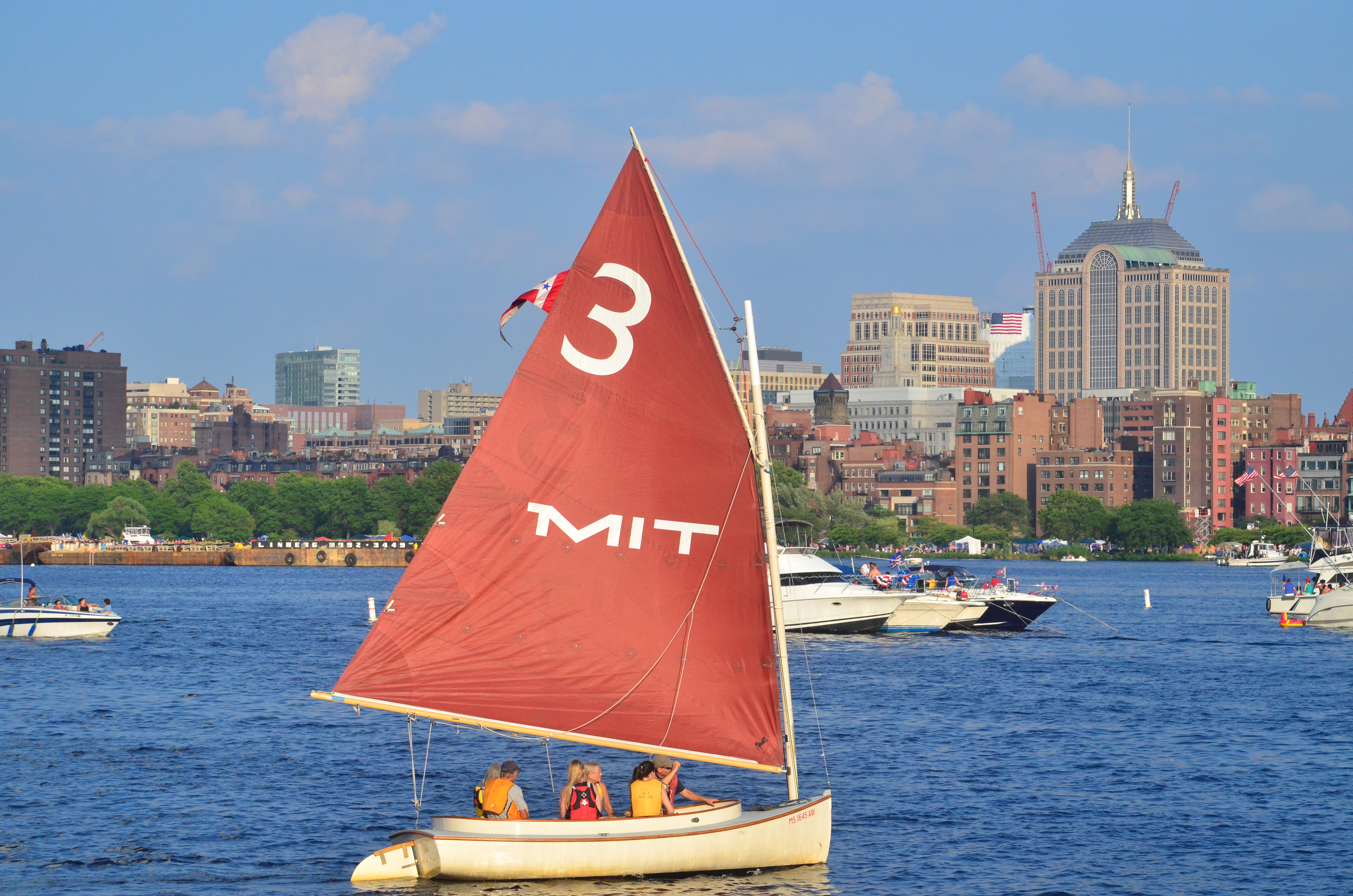
MIT sailing team in 2012

| Sport | Association | Division | Year | Opponent/Runner-up | Score |
|---|---|---|---|---|---|
| Men's Cross Country (1) | NCAA | Division III | 2022 | Wartburg | 82–129 |
| Men's Outdoor Track and Field (1) | NCAA | Division III | 2023 | UW-La Crosse | 60.5–49 |
| Women's Cross Country (1) | NCAA | Division III | 2024 | Chicago | 128–138 |
| Women's Indoor Track and Field (1) | NCAA | Division III | 2025 | Washington U. | 49–45.5 |
| Women's Swimming and Diving (1) | NCAA | Division III | 2025 | NYU | 497-470 |
| Women's Outdoor Track and Field (1) | NCAA | Division III | 2025 | Washington U. | 56–47 |

=== Individual ===
| Name | Sport | Event | Division | Year |
|---|---|---|---|---|
| Henry Steinbrenner | Men's Track and Field | 220yd Hurdles | NC | 1927 |
| John Pearson | Men's Track and Field | Hammer Throw | Division III | 1974 |
| Frank Richardson | Men's Track and Field | 10,000m | Division III | 1977 |
| Dave Kieda | Men's Track and Field | Hammer Throw | Division III | 1982 |
| Pat Parris | Men's Indoor Track | Weight Throw | Division III | 1985 |
| Yvonne Grierson | Women's Swimming | 100yd Butterfly | Division III | 1988 |
| Yvonne Grierson | Women's Swimming | 100yd Freestyle | Division III | 1989 |
| Yvonne Grierson | Women's Swimming | 100yd Butterfly | Division III | 1989 |
| Scott Deering | Men's Indoor Track | Weight Throw | Division III | 1989 |
| Bill Singhose | Men's Track and Field | Decathlon | Division III | 1989 |
| Boniface Makitiani | Men's Indoor Track | 400m | Division III | 1990 |
| Yvonne Grierson | Women's Swimming | 100yd Butterfly | Division III | 1990 |
| Mark Dunzo | Men's Indoor Track | 400m | Division III | 1991 |
| Ethan Crain | Men's Track and Field | 1500m | Division III | 1994 |
| John Wallberg | Men's Indoor Track | Weight Throw | Division III | 1997 |
| Caroline Purcell | Women's Fencing | Sabre | NC | 2000 |
| Uzoma Orji | Men's Indoor Track | Shot Put | Division III | 2004 |
| Uzoma Orji | Men's Indoor Track | Shot Put | Division III | 2005 |
| Uzoma Orji | Men's Indoor Track | Weight Throw | Division III | 2005 |
| Doria Holbrook | Women's Diving | 3 meter | Division III | 2005 |
| Uzoma Orji | Men's Indoor Track | Shot Put | Division III | 2006 |
| Uzoma Orji | Men's Indoor Track | Weight Throw | Division III | 2006 |
| Doria Holbrook | Women's Diving | 3 meter | Division III | 2007 |
| Jacqui Wentz | Women's Track and Field | Steeplechase | Division III | 2010 |
| Stephen Morton | Men's Track and Field | Long Jump | Division III | 2010 |
| Bo Mattix, Michael Liao, Wyatt Ubellacker, Craig Cheney | Men's Swimming | 200yd Medley Relay | Division III | 2013 |
| Wyatt Ubellacker | Men's Swimming | 50yd Freestyle | Division III | 2013 |
| Wyatt Ubellacker | Men's Swimming | 100yd Butterfly | Division III | 2013 |
| Cimran Virdi | Women's Indoor Track | Pole Vault | Division III | 2014 |
| Cimran Virdi | Women's Indoor Track | Pole Vault | Division III | 2015 |
| Maryann Gong | Women's Indoor Track | 3000m | Division III | 2015 |
| Cimran Virdi | Women's Track and Field | Pole Vault | Division III | 2015 |
| Dougie Kogut | Men's Swimming | 200yd Butterfly | Division III | 2016 |
| Cimran Virdi | Women's Track and Field | Pole Vault | Division III | 2016 |
| Yorai Shaoul | Men's Indoor Track | Triple Jump | Division III | 2019 |
| Jay Lang | Men's Diving | 3 meter | Division III | 2019 |
| Yorai Shaoul | Men's Track and Field | Triple Jump | Division III | 2019 |
| Edenna Chen | Women's Swimming | 100yd Breaststroke | Division III | 2022 |
| Adam Janicki, Tobe Obochi, Kyri Chen, Alex Ellison | Men's Swimming | 200yd Freestyle Relay | Division III | 2022 |
| Tobe Obochi, Jaden Luo, Kyri Chen, Alex Ellison | Men's Swimming | 400yd Freestyle Relay | Division III | 2022 |
| Tobe Obochi | Men's Swimming | 100yd Freestyle | Division III | 2022 |
| Ryan Wilson | Men's Indoor Track | 800m | Division III | 2022 |
| Kenneth Wei | Men's Indoor Track | Long Jump | Division III | 2022 |
| Ryan Wilson | Men's Track and Field | 800m | Division III | 2022 |
| Kenneth Wei | Men's Track and Field | Long Jump | Division III | 2022 |
| Kenneth Wei | Men's Track and Field | 110m Hurdles | Division III | 2022 |
| Luka Srsic | Men's Track and Field | Pole Vault | Division III | 2022 |
| Kimmy McPherson | Women's Track and Field | High Jump | Division III | 2022 |
| Mishael Quraishi, Kathleen Love, Haley Higginbotham, Tasha Hirt, Eve Shoen | IRA National Championship | Women's Lightweight Four | IRA | 2022 |
| Ryan Wilson | Men's Indoor Track | Mile | Division III | 2023 |
| Kenneth Wei | Men's Indoor Track | Long Jump | Division III | 2023 |
| Ryan Wilson | Men's Track and Field | 1500m | Division III | 2023 |
| Ryan Wilson | Men's Track and Field | 800m | Division III | 2023 |
| Enoch Ellis | Men's Track and Field | 110m Hurdles | Division III | 2023 |
| Alexis Boykin | Women's Track and Field | Hammer Throw | Division III | 2023 |
| Tobe Obochi | Men's Swimming | 50yd Freestyle | Division III | 2024 |
| Alexis Boykin | Women's Indoor Track | Weight Throw | Division III | 2024 |
| Alexis Boykin | Women's Indoor Track | Shot Put | Division III | 2024 |
| Kate Augustyn, Edenna Chen, Annika Naveen, Ella Roberson | Women's Swimming | 200yd Medley Relay | Division III | 2024 |
| Kate Augustyn | Women's Swimming | 100yd Backstroke | Division III | 2024 |
| Kate Augustyn | Women's Swimming | 200yd Backstroke | Division III | 2024 |
| Alexis Boykin | Women's Track and Field | Shot Put | Division III | 2024 |
| Jackson Bliey | Men's Track and Field | High Jump | Division III | 2024 |
| Alexis Boykin | Women's Track and Field | Hammer Throw | Division III | 2024 |
| Alexis Boykin | Women's Track and Field | Weight Throw | Division III | 2025 |
| Alexis Boykin | Women's Track and Field | Shot Put | Division III | 2025 |
| Jackson Bliey | Men's Track and Field | High Jump | Division III | 2025 |
| Kate Augustyn | Women's Swimming | 100yd Backstroke | Division III | 2025 |
| Kate Augustyn | Women's Swimming | 200yd Backstroke | Division III | 2025 |
| Sydney Smith | Women's Swimming | 100yd Butterfly | Division III | 2025 |
| Kate Augustyn, Sarah Bernard, Sydney Smith, Alex Turvey | Women's Swimming | 400yd Medley Relay | Division III | 2025 |
| Kate Augustyn, Sarah Bernard, Annika Naveen, Ella Roberson | Women's Swimming | 200yd Medley Relay | Division III | 2025 |
| Alex Turvey, Sydney Smith, Ella Roberson, Annika Naveen | Women's Swimming | 200yd Freestyle Relay | Division III | 2025 |
| Alex Turvey, Sydney Smith, Kate Augustyn, Ella Roberson | Women's Swimming | 400yd Freestyle Relay | Division III | 2025 |
| Jackson Bliey | Men's Track and Field | High Jump | Division III | 2025 |
| Alexis Boykin | Women's Track and Field | Shot Put | Division III | 2025 |
| Olivia Dias, Shreya Kalyan, Krystal Montgomery, Marina Miller | Women's Track and Field | 4x400m Relay | Division III | 2025 |
| Rujuta Sane | Women's Track and Field | 5000m | Division III | 2026 |
| Fiora Beratahani | Women's Swimming | 3 meter | Division III | 2026 |

== Individual teams ==
=== Ice hockey ===
MIT's men's ice hockey team was one of the earliest collegiate hockey programs in the United States. It "was organized in the winter of 1899 to introduce the Canadian game of Hockey in the Institute". The team has played almost continually since. Over the years it played many of the premier programs in the country, however, the sport was steadily deemphasized after World War II. The program was progressively reclassified as a tier II then tier III program in the 1960s and 70s before losing varsity status entirely in 1975.

== Facilities ==
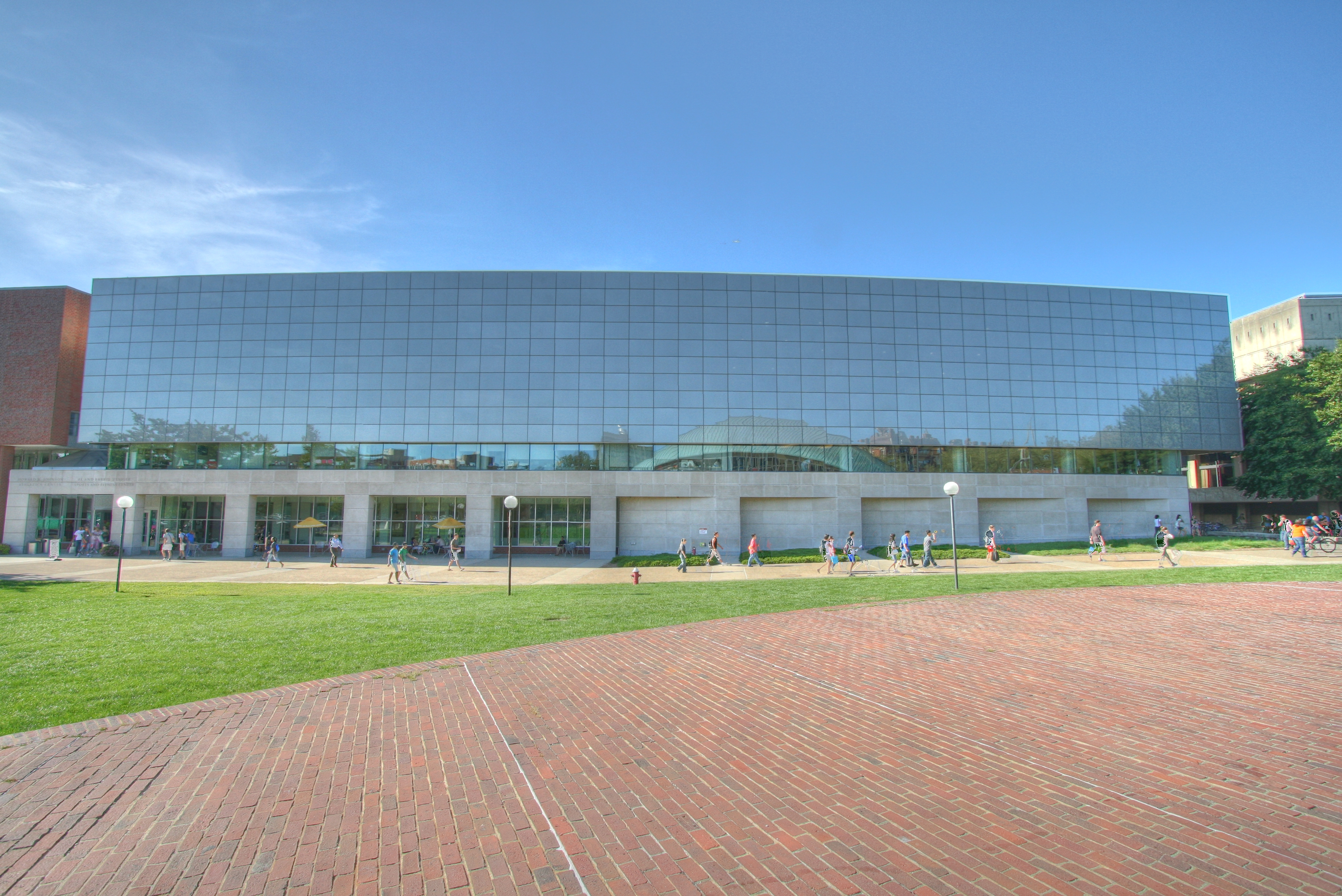
Zesiger Sports and Fitness Center

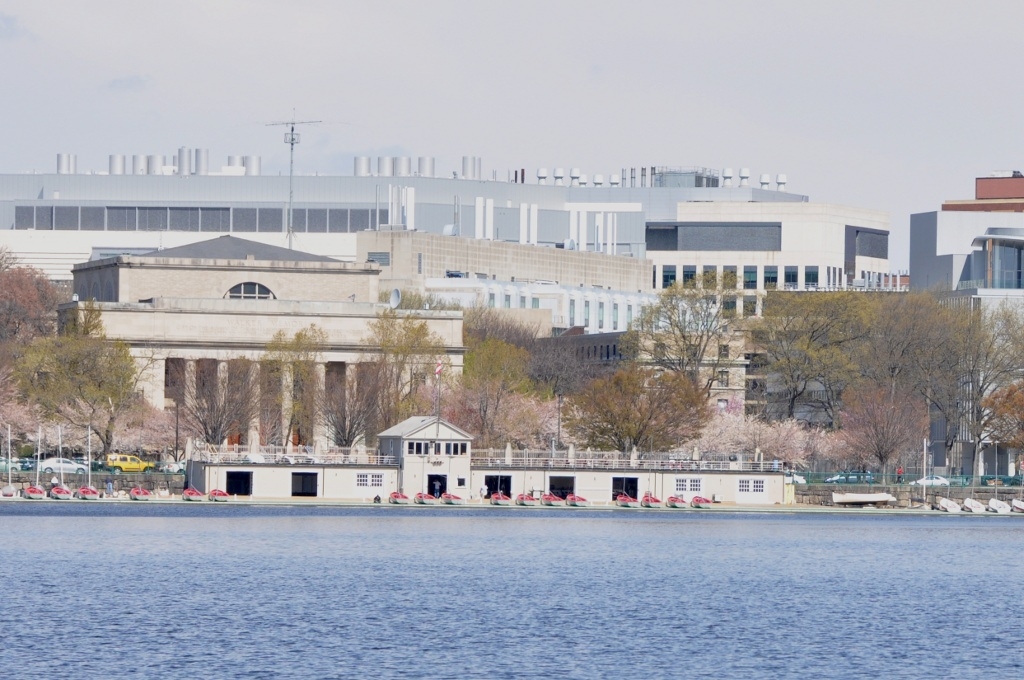
Wood Sailing Pavilion

| Venue | Varsity sport(s) | Club/Intramural(s) |
|---|---|---|
| Zesiger Sports and Fitness Center | Squash | Dodgeball, Floor hockey, Soccer, Squash, Triathlon, Water polo |
| Zesiger Sports and Fitness Center | Swimming and diving | Dodgeball, Floor hockey, Soccer, Squash, Triathlon, Water polo |
| Zesiger Sports and Fitness Center | Water polo | Dodgeball, Floor hockey, Soccer, Squash, Triathlon, Water polo |
| Alumni Pool & Wang Fitness Center | – | Triathlon |
| Johnson Athletic Center | Fencing | Cricket, Figure Skating, Ice Hockey, Soccer |
| Johnson Athletic Center | Tennis | Cricket, Figure Skating, Ice Hockey, Soccer |
| Johnson Athletic Center | Track and field | Cricket, Figure Skating, Ice Hockey, Soccer |
| Rockwell Cage | Basketball | Archery, Badminton, Basketball, Volleyball |
| Rockwell Cage | Volleyball | Archery, Badminton, Basketball, Volleyball |
| duPont Athletic Center | Basketball | Air Pistol, Cheerleading, Golf, Gymnastics, Martial Arts, Sport Pistol, Table Tennis, Wrestling |
| duPont Athletic Center | Fencing | Air Pistol, Cheerleading, Golf, Gymnastics, Martial Arts, Sport Pistol, Table Tennis, Wrestling |
| duPont Athletic Center | Rifle | Air Pistol, Cheerleading, Golf, Gymnastics, Martial Arts, Sport Pistol, Table Tennis, Wrestling |
| duPont Athletic Center | Volleyball | Air Pistol, Cheerleading, Golf, Gymnastics, Martial Arts, Sport Pistol, Table Tennis, Wrestling |
| Henry Steinbrenner Stadium | Football | Rugby, Soccer, Ultimate Frisbee |
| Henry Steinbrenner Stadium | Men's Lacrosse | Rugby, Soccer, Ultimate Frisbee |
| Henry Steinbrenner Stadium | Soccer | Rugby, Soccer, Ultimate Frisbee |
| Henry Steinbrenner Stadium | Track and field (outdoor) | Rugby, Soccer, Ultimate Frisbee |
| Jack Barry Field | Field Hockey | Cricket, Rugby, Soccer, Softball, Ultimate Frisbee |
| Jack Barry Field | Women's Lacrosse | Cricket, Rugby, Soccer, Softball, Ultimate Frisbee |
| Fran O'Brien Field | Baseball | – |
| Briggs Field | Softball | – |
| duPont Tennis Courts | Tennis | Tennis |
| J.B. Carr Tennis Bubble | Tennis | Tennis |
| Walter Wood Pavilion | Sailing | – |
| Richard Resch Boathouse | Crew | Rowing |
| Briggs Practice Fields | – | Rugby, Soccer, Ultimate Frisbee |
