= 1974 NCAA Division III Outdoor Track and Field Championships =

- Dates: May 29 - May 31, 1974
- Host city: Charleston, IL; Eastern Illinois
- Events: 20

The 1974 NCAA Division III Outdoor Track and Field Championships, were the first year the Division II/III designation was recognized in NCAA track and field. Previously, it was called the College Division. The top 6 athletes scored in their perspective event.

== Results ==
=== 100 Yard Dash ===
The event was wind aided. The 100 yd dash which is slightly shorter than a 100 meters, is 91.44 meters. All races at the time where hand timed.

Rank	Name	University	Time	Notes
1st place, gold medalist(s)	(Guyana) James Gilkes	Fisk	9.4	NAIA
2nd place, silver medalist(s)	Joe Franklin	Southern–New Orleans	9.5	NAIA
3rd place, bronze medalist(s)	Joe Kendrick	Ashland	9.5	DII
4	Herman Verdin	Southern–New Orleans	9.8	NAIA
5	Clint Alguire	Mount Union	9.8	
6	Fred Mintz	Baldwin Wallace	9.8	

=== 220 Yard Dash ===
Rank	Name	University	Time	Notes
1st place, gold medalist(s)	(Guyana) James Gilkes	Fisk	20.7	NAIA
2nd place, silver medalist(s)	Herman Verdin	Southern–New Orleans	21.4	NAIA
3rd place, bronze medalist(s)	Joe Franklin	Southern–New Orleans	21.5	NAIA
4	Leonard Elion	Fisk	21.6	NAIA
5	Joe Kendrick	Ashland	21.6	DII
6	Vince Williams	Chicago State	21.6	DI

=== 440 yard Dash ===
Rank	Name	University	Time	Notes
1st place, gold medalist(s)	Kip Korir	Coe	47.3	
2nd place, silver medalist(s)	Mike Williams	Mount Union	47.9	
3rd place, bronze medalist(s)	Ronald Bethune	Southern–New Orleans	48.5	NAIA
4	Terry Youngblood	Central (Iowa)	48.7	
5	Bill Taylor	Pomona-Pitzer	48.8	
6	Carl Hill	Southwestern (Ten.)	48.9	'

=== 880 yard Run ===
Rank	Name	University	Time	Notes
1st place, gold medalist(s)	Barry King	Ashland	1:51.2	DII
2nd place, silver medalist(s)	Bob Linn	Ashland	1:51.3	DII
3rd place, bronze medalist(s)	Harold Small	Brandeis	1:52.0	
4	Al Tonks	Baldwin Wallace	1:52.0	
5	Alan Kleinsasser	Caltech	1:52.0	
6	Manny Rivera	Brandeis	1:52.1	

=== One Mile Run ===
Rank	Name	University	Time	Notes
1st place, gold medalist(s)	Steve Foster	Ashland	4:05.1	DII
2nd place, silver medalist(s)	Scott Barrett	North Central	4:06.6	
3rd place, bronze medalist(s)	Fred Suarez	SUNY Oswego	4:07.4	
4	Jim Muus	St. Olaf	4:08.2	
5	Chris Horton	Brandeis	4:08.6	
6	Dan Spear	Hamline	4:08.7	

=== Three Mile Run ===
Rank	Name	University	Time	Notes
1st place, gold medalist(s)	David Moller	Rochester	13:54.6	
2nd place, silver medalist(s)	John O'Conner	Augustana (IL)	14:07.4	
3rd place, bronze medalist(s)	Cliff Karthauser	Nebraska Wesleyan	14:08.8	
4	Dan Copper	Augustana (IL)	14:12.8	
5	Randy Luce	Pomona-Pitzer	14:14.6	
6	John Bradford	Brandeis	14:17.6	

=== 120 Yard Hurdles ===
Rank	Name	University	Time	Notes
1st place, gold medalist(s)	Roger Retherford	Otterbein	14.2	
2nd place, silver medalist(s)	Wayne Covington	Lock Haven	14.3	DII
3rd place, bronze medalist(s)	Steve Smith	Pomona-Pitzer	14.4	
4	Gerald Greenfield	Johns Hopkins	14.4	
5	Keith Wolling	RIT	14.5	
6	Steve Wilson	Western Maryland	14.6	

=== 440 Yard Hurdles ===
Rank	Name	University	Time	Notes
1st place, gold medalist(s)	Tony Cornelious	Augustana (IL)	53.3	
2nd place, silver medalist(s)	Keith Wolling	RIT	53.7	
3rd place, bronze medalist(s)	Jim Baum	Ashland	53.7	DII
4	Steve Smith	Pomona-Pitzer	53.7	
5	Greg Traxler	St. John's (MN)	55.5	
6	Terry Kozina	Ashland	55.6	DII

=== 3000 Meter Steeplechase ===
Rank	Name	University	Time	Notes
1st place, gold medalist(s)	Gary Johnson	Westmont	9:17.8	NAIA
2nd place, silver medalist(s)	Lee Pollock	St. Lawrence	9:23.2	
3rd place, bronze medalist(s)	Mark Duggan	Boston State	9:36.0	
4	Larry Coy	Baldwin Wallace	9:37.6	
5	Dave Hanson	Luther	9:41.0	
6	Tim Hawley	Wabash	10:07.4	

=== High Jump ===
Rank	Name	University	Height	Notes
1st place, gold medalist(s)	Kurt Nielson	Nebraska Wesleyan	2.01m	
2nd place, silver medalist(s)	Greg Gornsuch	Wheaton	2.01m	
3rd place, bronze medalist(s)	Dave Miller	Baldwin Wallace	1.96m	
4	Bruce Crowe	Washington (MD)	1.96m	
5	John Stanek	Augustana (IL)	1.96m	
6	Jim Wildgreen	Hope	1.96m	

=== Pole Vault ===
Rank	Name	University	Height	Notes
1st place, gold medalist(s)	Steve Hughes	Westmont	4.72m	NAIA
2nd place, silver medalist(s)	Craig Boyak	Kalamazoo	4.57m	
3rd place, bronze medalist(s)	Charles Novak	St. Olaf	4.57m	
4	Steve Mason	Pomona-Pitzer	4.42m	
5	Joe Thompson	Augustana (IL)	4.27m	Tie
5	Paul Ksionzyk	Cortland (SUNY)	4.27m	Tie

=== Long Jump ===
Rank	Name	University	Distance	Notes
1st place, gold medalist(s)	David Boyd	Fisk University	7.82m	NAIA
2nd place, silver medalist(s)	Chuck Larsuel	Mount Union	7.30m	
3rd place, bronze medalist(s)	Rick Steinberg	Luther	7.22m	
4	Milt Snodgrass	Mount Union	7.22m	
5	Ronald Bethune	Southern–New Orleans	7.10m	NAIA
6	Don Harvey	Alma	7.02m	

=== Triple Jump ===
Rank	Name	University	Distance	Notes
1st place, gold medalist(s)	Anthony Palumbo	Rochester	15.21m	
2nd place, silver medalist(s)	Rudy Sawyerl	St. John's (MN)	14.86m	
3rd place, bronze medalist(s)	Kip Korir	Coe	14.73m	
4	Guy Jensen	Otterbein	14.37m	
5	Mike Williams	Widener	14.35m	
6	Charles Drummond	Brockport St.	14.18m	

=== Shot Put ===
Rank	Name	University	Distance	Notes
1st place, gold medalist(s)	Steve Lindgren	Hamline	17.03m	
2nd place, silver medalist(s)	Ray Fogg	Pomona-Pitzer	16.91m	
3rd place, bronze medalist(s)	Joe Gould	Queens	16.40m	DII
4	Rudy Vido	Albany (SUNY)	16.23m	DI
5	Stephan Ondrejack	Trenton State	15.90m	
6	John Dupuis	Worcester State	15.40m	

=== Discus Throw ===
Rank	Name	University	Distance	Notes
1st place, gold medalist(s)	Bill Iovino	Ohio Wesleyan	52.14m	
2nd place, silver medalist(s)	George Liset	Wheaton	49.76m	
3rd place, bronze medalist(s)	Bob Scott	Augustana (IL)	49.66m	
4	Rod Ridgeway	Wittenberg	49.14m	
5	Terrance Bruce	Alfred	48.26m	
6	John Dupuis	Worcester State	47.72m	

=== Hammer throw ===
Rank	Name	University	Distance	Notes
1st place, gold medalist(s)	John Pearson	MIT	51.92m	
2nd place, silver medalist(s)	Joe Gould	Queens	50.60m	DII
3rd place, bronze medalist(s)	John Kock	RIT	48.62m	
4	Warren Shank	Westmont	48.28m	
5	Tom Lowell	RPI	48.18m	
6	Lewis Farber	RPI	45.26m	

=== Javelin Throw ===
The Javelin thrown in 1973 was different from the current model. Therefore, results cannot be directly compared to today's results.

Rank	Name	University	Distance	Notes
1st place, gold medalist(s)	Robert Sing	Ursinus	71.60m	
2nd place, silver medalist(s)	Joe Gould	Queens	68.32m	DII
3rd place, bronze medalist(s)	Kevin Peter	Pomona-Pitzer	68.14m	
4	Bob Orell	Pomona-Pitzer	67.62m	
5	Greg Afman	Calvin	63.84m	
6	Glenn Levengood	Susquehanna	62.74m	

=== Decathlon ===
Rank	Name	University	Points	Notes
1st place, gold medalist(s)	Jim Baum	Ashland	7,030	DII
2nd place, silver medalist(s)	Robert Ryan	Rochester	6,528	
3rd place, bronze medalist(s)	Mark Lineweaver	Brockport St.	6,499	
4	Chuck Williams	Case Western	6,376	
5	Larry Griffith	Mount Union	6,300	
6	Mike Hunt	Capital	6,244	

=== 440 Yard Relay ===
Rank	Team	Name	Time	Notes
1st place, gold medalist(s)	Mount Union	Milt Snodgrass	41.1	
1st place, gold medalist(s)	Mount Union	Chuck Larsuel	41.1	
1st place, gold medalist(s)	Mount Union	Mike Williams	41.1	
1st place, gold medalist(s)	Mount Union	Clint Alguire	41.1	
2nd place, silver medalist(s)	Southern–New Orleans	Herman Verdin	41.2	NAIA
2nd place, silver medalist(s)	Southern–New Orleans	Ronald Bethune	41.2	NAIA
2nd place, silver medalist(s)	Southern–New Orleans	Larry Williams	41.2	NAIA
2nd place, silver medalist(s)	Southern–New Orleans	Joe Franklin	41.2	NAIA
3rd place, bronze medalist(s)	Fisk	David Boyd	41.3	NAIA
3rd place, bronze medalist(s)	Fisk	Leonard Elion	41.3	NAIA
3rd place, bronze medalist(s)	Fisk	Leon Stubbs	41.3	NAIA
3rd place, bronze medalist(s)	Fisk	(Guyana) James Gilkes	41.3	NAIA
4	Baldwin-Wallace	Everett Head	41.8	
4	Baldwin-Wallace	Mark Allio	41.8	
4	Baldwin-Wallace	Tony DiMarzo	41.8	
4	Baldwin-Wallace	Fred Mintz	41.8	
5	Denison	B. Thompson	42.1	
5	Denison	Ed Cione	42.1	
5	Denison	R. Price	42.1	
5	Denison	Tony Thompson	42.1	
6	Chicago State	Clifford Fletcher	42.4	DI
6	Chicago State	Willie Patton	42.4	DI
6	Chicago State	Sudie Davis	42.4	DI
6	Chicago State	Vince Williams	42.4	DI

=== Mile Relay ===
Rank	Team	Name	Time	Notes
1st place, gold medalist(s)	Mount Union	Chuck Larsuel	3:15.7	
1st place, gold medalist(s)	Mount Union	Jim Freund	3:15.7	
1st place, gold medalist(s)	Mount Union	Mike Williams	3:15.7	
1st place, gold medalist(s)	Mount Union	Milt Snodgrass	3:15.7	
2nd place, silver medalist(s)	Ashland	Jim Baum	3:16.2	DII
2nd place, silver medalist(s)	Ashland	Barry King	3:16.2	DII
2nd place, silver medalist(s)	Ashland	Terry Kozma	3:16.2	DII
2nd place, silver medalist(s)	Ashland	Bob Linn	3:16.2	DII
3rd place, bronze medalist(s)	Southern–New Orleans	Herman Verdin	3:16.2	NAIA
3rd place, bronze medalist(s)	Southern–New Orleans	Craig Louis	3:16.2	NAIA
3rd place, bronze medalist(s)	Southern–New Orleans	Ronald Bethune	3:16.2	NAIA
3rd place, bronze medalist(s)	Southern–New Orleans	Donald Clark	3:16.2	NAIA
4	Augustana (IL)	Enyo DeWith	3:17.2	
4	Augustana (IL)	Scott Stephens	3:17.2	
4	Augustana (IL)	Bill Yemm	3:17.2	
4	Augustana (IL)	Tony Cornelious	3:17.2	
5	Brandeis	Allen Knight	3:18.2	
5	Brandeis	Mike Ricciardone	3:18.2	
5	Brandeis	Manny Rivera	3:18.2	
5	Brandeis	Harold Small	3:18.2	
6	Baruch	Tyrone Cunningham	3:18.6	
6	Baruch	Harold Reardon	3:18.6	
6	Baruch	George Bailey	3:18.6	
6	Baruch	Mario Church	3:18.6	
