= Emory Eagles =

- University: Emory University
- Nickname: Eagles
- NCAA: Division III
- Conference: University Athletic Association
- Athletic director: Keiko Price-Carter
- Location: Atlanta, Georgia
- Varsity teams: 17
- Basketball arena: Woodruff P.E. Center
- Baseball stadium: Chappell Park
- Softball stadium: George F. Cooper, Jr. Field
- Soccer stadium: Woodruff P.E. Center
- Aquatics center: Madeleine Jude Brown Aquatic Center
- Tennis venue: Woodruff PE Center Tennis Courts
- Colors: Blue and gold
- Website: emoryathletics.com
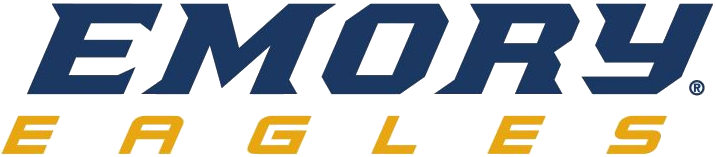

Team NCAA championships
- 34

Individual and relay NCAA champions
- 152

The Emory Eagles are the athletic teams that represent Emory University, located in Atlanta, Georgia, in NCAA Division III intercollegiate sports.

The Eagles compete as members of the University Athletic Association (UAA) for all sports.

== Conference affiliations ==
- University Athletic Association (1986–present)

== Varsity teams ==
=== List of teams ===
Men's sports

- Baseball
- Basketball
- Cross country
- Golf
- Soccer
- Swimming & diving
- Tennis
- Track & Field

Women's sports

- Basketball
- Cross country
- Golf
- Soccer
- Softball
- Swimming & diving
- Tennis
- Track & field
- Volleyball

== National championships ==
=== Team ===
Sport	Association	Division	Year	Opponent/Runner-up	Score
Women's golf (2)	NCAA	Division III	2022	Redlands	1,168–1,1181
Women's golf (2)	NCAA	Division III	2025	Carnegie Mellon	1,175–1,201
Men's swimming and diving (4)	NCAA	Division III	2017	Kenyon	438–384
Men's swimming and diving (4)	NCAA	Division III	2022	Johns Hopkins	427.5–340
Men's swimming and diving (4)	NCAA	Division III	2023	Kenyon	532–495.5
Men's swimming and diving (4)	NCAA	Division III	2024	Kenyon	434–391
Women's swimming and diving (12)	NCAA	Division III	2005	Kenyon	399.5–313
Women's swimming and diving (12)	NCAA	Division III	2006	Kenyon	428–418
Women's swimming and diving (12)	NCAA	Division III	2010	Denison	568.5–452
Women's swimming and diving (12)	NCAA	Division III	2011	Denison	614–428
Women's swimming and diving (12)	NCAA	Division III	2012	Williams	639–453
Women's swimming and diving (12)	NCAA	Division III	2013	Kenyon	619–483
Women's swimming and diving (12)	NCAA	Division III	2014	Kenyon	595.5–456.5
Women's swimming and diving (12)	NCAA	Division III	2015	Denison	603–457.5
Women's swimming and diving (12)	NCAA	Division III	2016	Kenyon	560–476
Women's swimming and diving (12)	NCAA	Division III	2017	Williams	645.5–445
Women's swimming and diving (12)	NCAA	Division III	2018	Kenyon	603–500
Women's swimming and diving (12)	NCAA	Division III	2019	Kenyon	488–479
Men's tennis (6)	NCAA	Division III	2003	Williams	4–0
Men's tennis (6)	NCAA	Division III	2006	Middlebury	4–1
Men's tennis (6)	NCAA	Division III	2012	Kenyon	5–3
Men's tennis (6)	NCAA	Division III	2017	Claremont-Mudd-Scripps	5–2
Men's tennis (6)	NCAA	Division III	2019	Claremont-Mudd-Scripps	5–3
Men's tennis (6)	NCAA	Division III	2021	Case Western Reserve	5–2
Women's tennis (8)	NCAA	Division III	1996	Washington and Lee	5–1
Women's tennis (8)	NCAA	Division III	2003	Washington and Lee	5–1
Women's tennis (8)	NCAA	Division III	2004	Amherst	5–0
Women's tennis (8)	NCAA	Division III	2005	Washington and Lee	5–3
Women's tennis (8)	NCAA	Division III	2006	Washington and Lee	5–1
Women's tennis (8)	NCAA	Division III	2014	Amherst	5–1
Women's tennis (8)	NCAA	Division III	2016	Williams	5–4
Women's tennis (8)	NCAA	Division III	2021	Wesleyan	5–0
Women's volleyball (2)	NCAA	Division III	2008	La Verne	3–1
Women's volleyball (2)	NCAA	Division III	2018	Calvin	3–0
