= 1982 NCAA Division II Women's Swimming and Diving Championships =

American college aquatic sports competition

1982 NCAA Division I Women's Swimming and Diving Championships
- Host city: Clarion, Pennsylvania
- Date(s): March 1982
- Venue(s): Clarion University

The 1982 NCAA Women's Division II Swimming and Diving Championships were the first annual NCAA-sanctioned swim meet to determine the team and individual national champions of Division II women's collegiate swimming and diving in the United States.

The inaugural event was hosted by Clarion University in Clarion, Pennsylvania.

Cal State Northridge topped the team standings and took home the inaugural Division II women's team title.

== Team standings ==
- Note: Top 10 only
- Full results

Rank	Team	Points
1st place, gold medalist(s)	Cal State Northridge	391
2nd place, silver medalist(s)	Vanderbilt	324
3rd place, bronze medalist(s)	Oakland	311
4	UC Davis	219
5	Tampa	204
6	Cal Poly–San Luis Obispo	192
7	Sacramento State	175
8	New Hampshire	168
9	Chico State	123
10	San Francisco State	113

== See also ==
- List of college swimming and diving teams
