= Harry Parsons =

Harry Parsons may refer to:

- Harry Parsons (Australian footballer)
- Harry Parsons (English footballer)

== See also ==
- Henry Parsons (disambiguation)
