= NCAA Division III women's golf championship =

Collegiate golf competition

NCAA Division III Women's Golf Championships
Tournament information
- Location: 2026: Palm Desert, California
- Established: 2000
- Course: 2026: Desert Willow Golf Resort
- Par: 2026: 72
- Length: 2026: 5,883 yards (5,379 m)
- Format: Stroke play, 72 holes
- Month played: May

Current champion
- Team: Emory; Individual: Carter Sichol (Carleton)

The NCAA Division III Women's Golf Championships, played in May, are the annual competitions in women's collegiate golf for individuals and teams from universities in Division III. It is a stroke play team competition with an additional individual award.

A combined Division II and Division III championship was held from 1996 to 1999, splitting into separate championships starting in 2000.

The most successful program, by far, has been Methodist, who have won 17 national titles, 15 of which were won consecutively between 1998 and 2012. The current champions are Emory, who won their third championship in 2026.

== Results ==
=== Divisions II and III combined (1996–1999) ===
Year	Site (Host team)	Par	Team championship				Individual championship	
Year	Site (Host team)	Par	Champion	Score	Runner-up	Score	Champion	Score
1996	Allendale, MI (Grand Valley State)	72 (288)	Methodist	1,286	Rollins	1,287	Shanna Nagy (Florida Southern)	313 (+25)
1997	Winter Park, FL (Rollins)	73 (292)	Lynn	1,292	Methodist	1,318	Zoe Grimbeek (Lynn)	315 (+23)
1998	Allendale, MI (Grand Valley State)	72 (288)	Methodist	1,254	Florida Southern	1,259	Shanna Nagy (Florida Southern)	301 (+13)
1999	–	72 (288)	Methodist	1,282	Florida Southern	1,285	Lisa Cave (Florida Southern)	313 (+25)

=== Division III only (2000–present) ===
Year	Site (Host team)	Par	Team championship				Individual championship	
Year	Site (Host team)	Par	Champion	Score	Runner-up	Score	Champion	Score
2000	Bloomington, IL (Illinois Wesleyan)	72 (288)	Methodist	1,285	Concordia–Moorhead	1,336	Stacey Smith (Methodist)	316 (+28)
2001	Decatur, IL (Millikin)	72 (288)	Methodist	1,214	Concordia–Moorhead	1,264	Carol Brogan (Methodist)	294 (+6)
2002	South Hadley, MA (Mount Holyoke)	72 (288)	Methodist	1,310	Mary Hardin-Baylor	1,341	Lynn Thompson (Thomas More)	312 (+24)
2003	Green Lake, WI	73 (292)	Methodist	1,295	Mary Hardin-Baylor	1,348	Stefanie Simmerman (Saint Mary's–IN)	315 (+23)
2004	Green Lake, WI	73 (292)	Methodist	1,303	Mary Hardin-Baylor	1,305	Brittany Cary (McMurry)	314 (+22)
2005	Southern Pines, NC	72 (288)	Methodist	1,272	Mary Hardin-Baylor	1,284	Charlotte Williams (Methodist)	304 (+16)
2006	Howey-in-the-Hills, FL	73 (292)	Methodist	1,240	Gustavus Adolphus	1,316	Charlotte Williams (Methodist)	308 (+16)
2007	Howey-in-the-Hills, FL	73 (292)	Methodist	1,215	DePauw	1,303	Katie Dick (Methodist)	296 (+4)
2008	Waverly, IA (Wartburg)	72 (288)	Methodist	1,219	DePauw	1,258	Susan Martin (Methodist)	294 (+6)
2009	Port St. Lucie, FL	72 (288)	Methodist	1,257	Wisconsin–Stevens Point	1,282	Susan Martin (Methodist)	294 (+6)
2010	Howey-in-the-Hills, FL	73 (292)	Methodist	1,282	Gustavus Adolphus	1,301	Jessica Urban (Wisconsin–Stevens Point)	313 (+21)
2011	Howey-in-the-Hills, FL	73 † (219)	Methodist	966	Gustavus Adolphus	978	Paige Caldwell (Methodist)	232 (+13)
2012	Angola, IN (Trine)	72 (288)	Methodist	1,242	DePauw	1,248	Catherine Wagner (Wisconsin–Eau Claire)	302 (+14)
2013	Miramar Beach, FL	72 (288)	Mary Hardin-Baylor	1,239	Texas–Tyler	1,247	Laura Lindsey (Texas–Tyler)	296 (+8)
2014	Howey-in-the-Hills, FL	72 (288)	Rhodes	1,256	Mary Hardin-Baylor	1,280	Georgiana Salant (Williams)	303 (+15)
2015	Howey-in-the-Hills, FL	72 (288)	Williams	1,264	Wittenberg	1,281	McKenzie Ralston (Mary Hardin-Baylor)	301 (+13)
2016	Houston, TX	72 † (216)	Rhodes	904	Texas–Tyler	919	Caroline Ordian (Redlands)	218 (+2)
2017	Houston, TX	72 (288)	Rhodes	1,217	George Fox	1,219	Christina Herbert (Bridgewater)	295 (+5)
2018	Howey-in-the-Hills, FL	73 (292)	Claremont-Mudd-Scripps	1,261	Williams	1,261	Margaret Loncki (Claremont-Mudd-Scripps)	303 (+11)
2019	Houston, TX	72 (288)	NYU	1,217	Williams	1,222	Cordelia Chan (Williams College)	296 (+8)
2020	Cancelled due to the COVID-19 pandemic							
2021	East Lansing, MI	72 (288)	Methodist	1,231	Carnegie Mellon	1,236	Makensie Toole (George Fox)	291 (+3)
2022	Houston, TX	72 (288)	Emory	1,175	Redlands	1,201	Ellen Dong (Emory)	289 (+1)
2023	Howey-in-the-Hills, FL	73 † (219)	George Fox	933	Washington (MO)	938	Annie Mascot (Washington (MO))	224 (+5)
2024	Nicholasville, KY	72 (288)	Carnegie Mellon	1,187	Emory	1,201	Alison Takamiya (George Fox)	288 (E)
2025	Williamsburg, VA	72 (288)	Emory	1,168	Carnegie Mellon	1,181	Carys Code (Emory)	285 (−3)
2026	Palm Desert, CA	72 (288)	Emory	1,154	Carnegie Mellon	1,161	Carter Sichol (Carleton)	283 (−5)

- † Only three of the four scheduled rounds were played

== Multiple winners ==
=== Team ===
The following schools have won more than one team championship:

- 17: Methodist
- 3: Rhodes, Emory

=== Individual champion ===
The following women have won more than one individual championship:

- 2: Susan Martin, Shanna Nagy, Charlotte Williams

=== Individual champion's school ===
The following schools have produced more than one individual champion:

- 8 champions: Methodist
- 3 champions: Florida Southern
- 2 champions: Emory, Williams, George Fox

== See also ==
- AIAW Intercollegiate Women's Golf Champions
- NAIA Women's Golf Championship
- National Golf Coaches Association
