= NCAA Division III women's swimming and diving championships =

American collegiate water sports tournament

- the NCAA logo
- Association: NCAA
- Sport: Swimming and Diving
- Founded: 1982; 44 years ago
- Division: Division II
- Country: United States
- Most recent champion: NYU (1st)
- Most titles: Kenyon (25)
- Broadcaster: ESPNU
- Website: NCAA.com

The NCAA Division III women's swimming and diving championships are contested at the annual swim meet which is hosted by the National Collegiate Athletic Association to determine their individual as well team champions in the sport of women's collegiate swimming and diving among its Division III members in the United States.

The event has been held annually following the winter regular season, and it consists of individual and team championships. The meets take place in a 25-yard pool. Since its establishment, the championships have been held at the same time and venue as the Division III men's championships.

NYU are the reigning national champions, winning their first title in 2026.

== History ==
Swimming was one of twelve women's sports added to the NCAA championship program for the 1981-82 school year, as the NCAA engaged in battle with the Association for Intercollegiate Athletics for Women for sole governance of women's collegiate sports. The AIAW continued to conduct its established championship program in the same twelve (and other) sports; however, after a year of dual women's championships, the NCAA conquered the AIAW and usurped its authority and membership.

== Results ==
NCAA Division III women's swimming and diving championships
Year	Site	Natatorium	Championship Results			
Year	Site	Natatorium	Champion	Points	Runner-up	Points
1982; Details	(Virginia) Lexington, VA (Washington and Lee)	Cy Twombly Pool (swim); Virginia Military Institute (dive)	Williams	402	Kenyon	303
1983; Details	(Ohio) Canton, OH	C.T. Branin Natatorium; Canton McKinley High School	Williams (2)	330½	Hamline	286
1984; Details	(Georgia (U.S. state)) Atlanta, GA (Emory)	George W. Woodruff Physical Education Center	Kenyon	307½	Hamline	283½
1985; Details	(Georgia (U.S. state)) Atlanta, GA (Emory)	George W. Woodruff Physical Education Center	Kenyon (2)	496	Pomona–Pitzer	348
1986	(Ohio) Canton, OH	C.T. Branin Natatorium; Canton McKinley High School	Kenyon (3)	713	UC San Diego	403½
1987; Details	(Ohio) Canton, OH	C.T. Branin Natatorium; Canton McKinley High School	Kenyon (4)	659	Pomona–Pitzer	349½
1988; Details	(Georgia (U.S. state)) Atlanta, GA (Emory)	George W. Woodruff Physical Education Center	Kenyon (5)	581½	UC San Diego	338½
1989; Details	(Maine) Brunswick, ME (Bowdoin)	A. LeRoy Greason Swimming Pool	Kenyon (6)	631	UC San Diego	298½
1990; Details	(Illinois) Wheaton, IL (Wheaton)	Chrouser Aquatics Center	Kenyon (7)	506	UC San Diego	443
1991; Details	(Georgia (U.S. state)) Atlanta, GA (Emory)	George W. Woodruff Physical Education Center	Kenyon (8)	661½	UC San Diego	466
1992; Details	(New York (state)) Buffalo, NY (Erie CC)	Flickinger Aquatic Center	Kenyon (9)	750	UC San Diego	408
1993; Details	(Georgia (U.S. state)) Atlanta, GA (Emory)	George W. Woodruff Physical Education Center	Kenyon (10)	683	UC San Diego	451½
1994; Details	(Massachusetts) Williamstown, MA (Williams)	John Wesley Chandler Athletic Center	Kenyon (11)	595½	Hope	408½
1995; Details	Wesleyan	Middleton, CT	Kenyon (12)	527½	Williams	333
1996; Details	(Georgia (U.S. state)) Atlanta, GA (Emory)	George W. Woodruff Physical Education Center	Kenyon (13)	542	UC San Diego	380
1997; Details	(Ohio) Oxford, OH (Miami)	Corwin M. Nixon Aquatic Center	Kenyon (14)	572	Williams	377
1998; Details	(Missouri) St. Peters, MO	St. Peters Rec-Plex	Kenyon (15)	693½	Denison	522
1999; Details	Minneapolis, MN (Minnesota)	University of Minnesota Aquatic Center	Kenyon (16)	664½	Denson	503
2000; Details	(Georgia (U.S. state)) Atlanta, GA (Emory)	George W. Woodruff Physical Education Center	Kenyon (17)	619½	Denison	417½
2001; Details	(New York (state)) Buffalo, NY (Erie CC)	Flickinger Aquatic Center	Denison	588	Kenyon	572
2002; Details	(Ohio) Oxford, OH (Miami)	Corwin M. Nixon Aquatic Center	Kenyon (18)	577	Denison	418
2003; Details	(Georgia (U.S. state)) Atlanta, GA (Emory)	George W. Woodruff Physical Education Center	Kenyon (19)	560½	Williams	350
2004; Details	(Missouri) St. Peters, MO	St. Peters Rec-Plex	Kenyon (20)	507	Emory	362
2005; Details	(Michigan) Holland, MI	Holland Community Aquatic Center	Emory	399½	Kenyon	313
2006; Details	Minneapolis, MN (Minnesota)	University of Minnesota Aquatic Center	Emory (2)	428	Kenyon	418
2007; Details	(Texas) Houston, TX (Houston)	University of Houston; Campus Recreation and Wellness Center Natatorium	Kenyon (21)	538	Amherst	320
2008; Details	(Ohio) Oxford, OH (Miami)	Corwin M. Nixon Aquatic Center	Kenyon (22)	566½	Amherst	341
2009; Details	Minneapolis, MN (Minnesota)	University of Minnesota Aquatic Center	Kenyon (23)	560	Emory	466½
2010; Details	Minneapolis, MN (Minnesota)	University of Minnesota Aquatic Center	Emory (3)	568½	Denison	452
2011; Details	Knoxville, TN (Tennessee)	University of Tennessee, Allan Jones Aquatic Center	Emory (4)	614	Denison	428
2012; Details	Indianapolis, IN (Indiana)	Indiana University Natatorium	Emory (5)	639	Williams	453
2013; Details	(Texas) Shenandoah, TX	Conroe Independent School District Natatorium	Emory (6)	619	Kenyon	483
2014; Details	Indianapolis, IN (Indiana)	Indiana University Natatorium	Emory (7)	595½	Kenyon	456½
2015; Details	(Texas) Shenandoah, TX	Conroe Independent School District Natatorium	Emory (8)	603	Denison	457½
2016; Details	(North Carolina) Greensboro, NC	Greensboro Aquatic Center	Emory (9)	560	Kenyon	476
2017; Details	(Texas) Shenandoah, TX	Conroe Independent School District Natatorium	Emory (10)	645.5	Williams	445
2018; Details	(Indiana) Indianapolis, IN (Franklin)	Indiana University Natatorium	Emory (11)	603	Kenyon	500
2019; Details	(North Carolina) Greensboro, NC	Greensboro Aquatic Center	Emory (12)	488	Kenyon	479
2020	Cancelled due to the coronavirus pandemic					
2021	Cancelled due to the coronavirus pandemic					
2022; Details	(Indiana) Indianapolis, IN (Franklin)	Indiana University Natatorium	Kenyon (24)	311	Emory	307
2023; Details	(North Carolina) Greensboro, NC (ODAC)	Greensboro Aquatic Center	Denison (2)	464.5	Emory	385
2024; Details	(North Carolina) Greensboro, NC (ODAC)	Greensboro Aquatic Center	Kenyon (25)	448	Denison	430
2025; Details	(North Carolina) Greensboro, NC (ODAC)	Greensboro Aquatic Center	MIT	497	NYU	470
2026; Details	(Indiana) Indianapolis, IN (Franklin)	Indiana University Natatorium	NYU	517	Emory	433.5
2027	(North Carolina) Greensboro, NC (ODAC)	Greensboro Aquatic Center				
2028	(North Carolina) Greensboro, NC (ODAC)	Greensboro Aquatic Center				

== Champions ==
Team national championships among active programs: 25, 12, 2, 1

=== Active programs ===
Team	Titles	Years
Kenyon	25	1984, 1985, 1986, 1987, 1988, 1989, 1990, 1991, 1992, 1993, 1994, 1995, 1996, 1997, 1998, 1999, 2000, 2002, 2003, 2004, 2007, 2008, 2009, 2022, 2024
Emory	12	2005, 2006, 2010, 2011, 2012, 2013, 2014, 2015, 2016, 2017, 2018, 2019
Denison	2	2001, 2023
Williams	2	1982, 1983
MIT	1	2025
NYU	1	2026

== Championship records ==
Event	Time		Name	Club	Date	Location	Ref
50y freestyle	22.15		Kaley McIntyre	NYU	March 19, 2025	Greensboro, North Carolina	
100y freestyle	48.53		Kaley McIntyre	NYU	March 22, 2025	Greensboro, North Carolina	
200y freestyle	1:44.82		Kendra Stern	Amherst	March 24, 2011	Knoxville, Tennessee	
500y freestyle	4:43.37		Kendra Stern	Amherst	March 23, 2011	Knoxville, Tennessee	
1650y freestyle	16:17.84		Natalie Garre	Bowdoin	March 22, 2025	Greensboro, North Carolina	
100y backstroke	53.41	r, =	Kate Augustyn	MIT	March 21, 2024	Greensboro, North Carolina	
100y backstroke	53.41	=	Kate Augustyn	MIT	March 22, 2024	Greensboro, North Carolina	
200y backstroke	1:55.67		Crile Hart	Kenyon	March 24, 2018	Indianapolis, Indiana	
100y breaststroke	59.77		KT Kustritz	Denison	March 21, 2018	Indianapolis, Indiana	
200y breaststroke	2:10.06		Jordyn Wentzel	St. Kate's	March 19, 2022	Indianapolis, Indiana	
100y butterfly	52.64		Kirsten Nitz	Wheaton	March 20, 2014	Indianapolis, Indiana	
200y butterfly	1:55.66		Logan Todhunter	Williams	March 23, 2012	Indianapolis, Indiana	
200y individual medley	1:57.76		Crile Hart	Kenyon	March 16, 2022	Indianapolis, Indiana	
400y individual medley	4:11.23		Sophia Verkleeren	Williams	March 20, 2025	Greensboro, North Carolina	
4×50y freestyle relay	1:29.38		Lian Jeong Engle (22.99); Maeve O'Donnell (22.04); Llew Ladomirak (22.54); Kaley McIntyre (21.81)	NYU	March 19, 2026	Indianapolis, Indiana	
4×100y freestyle relay	3:18.46		Fiona Muir (49.84); Cindy Cheng (49.50); Ming-Fen Ong (50.08); Megan Taylor (49.04)	Emory	March 24, 2018	Indianapolis, Indiana	
4×200y freestyle relay	7:13.02		Nicole Ranile (1:50.01); Elle Motekaitis (1:49.30); Isabel Oldham (1:49.01); Kaley McIntyre (1:44.70)	NYU	March 21, 2025	Greensboro, North Carolina	
4×50y medley relay	1:39.51		Kate Augustyn (25.15); Sarah Bernard (28.46); Annika Naveen (23.88); Ella Roberson (22.02)	MIT	March 21, 2025	Greensboro, North Carolina	
4×100y medley relay	3:37.94		Gwen Eisenbeis (54.70); (Australia) Kelsey Van Eldik (59.25); Nora Kortuem (54.84); (France) Lisa Torrecillas-Jouault (49.15)	Kenyon	March 18, 2026	Indianapolis, Indiana	
1m Springboard	515.90		Danica Roskos	TCNJ	March 25, 2011	Knoxville, Tennessee	
3m Springboard	530.95	h	Kailee Payne	Ithaca	March 22, 2025	Greensboro, North Carolina	

Legend: # – Record awaiting ratification by NCAA;
Records not set in finals: h – heat; sf – semifinal; r – relay 1st leg; rh – relay heat 1st leg; b – B final; † – en route to final mark; so – swim-off; tt – time trial

== See also ==
- NCAA women's swimming and diving championships (Division I, Division II)
- NCAA men's swimming and diving championships (Division I, Division II, Division III)
- AIAW Intercollegiate Women's Swimming and Diving Champions
- NAIA Women's Swimming and Diving Championships
- List of college swimming and diving teams
