= NCAA Division III men's swimming and diving championships =

American collegiate water sports tournament

- NCAA logo
- Association: NCAA
- Sport: Swimming and Diving
- Founded: 1975; 51 years ago
- Division: Division III
- Country: United States
- Most recent champion: Denison (6th)
- Most titles: Kenyon (34)
- Broadcaster: ESPNU
- Website: NCAA.com

The NCAA Division III men's swimming and diving championships are contested at an annual swim meet hosted by the National Collegiate Athletic Association to determine the individual and team champions of men's collegiate swimming and diving among its Division III members in the United States. It has been held every year since 1975, except 2020.

Since 1982, it has been held concurrently with the Division III women's championships.

The most successful program has been Kenyon, who have won 34 national titles. Kenyon's 34 titles are the most by any collegiate program in one sport at any NCAA division. Furthermore, Kenyon's thirty-one consecutive titles (1980 until 2011), is also a record across all three divisions.

Denison are the reigning national champions, winning their sixth national title in 2025.

== Results ==
NCAA Division III men's swimming and diving championships
Year	Site	Natatorium	Championship Results			
Year	Site	Natatorium	Champion	Points	Runner-up	Points
1975; Details	(Pennsylvania) Meadville, PA (Allegheny)	Richard King Mellon Recreation Center	Chico State	465	Johns Hopkins	209
1976; Details	(Pennsylvania) Washington, PA (Washington & Jefferson)	Henry Memorial Center	St. Lawrence	249	Johns Hopkins	233
1977; Details	(Ohio) Oberlin, OH (Oberlin)	Robert K. Carr Pool	Johns Hopkins	272	Occidental	198
1978; Details	(Iowa) Grinnell, IA (Grinnell)	Physical Education Complex	Johns Hopkins (2)	284	Monmouth	204
1979; Details	(New York (state)) Geneseo, NY (Geneseo State)	Myrtle A. Merritt Athletic Center	Johns Hopkins (3)	340	Kenyon	241
1980; Details	(Pennsylvania) Washington, PA (Washington & Jefferson)	Henry Memorial Center	Kenyon	323	Johns Hopkins	277
1981; Details	(Ohio) Oberlin, OH (Oberlin)	Robert K. Carr Pool	Kenyon (2)	319	Johns Hopkins	272
1982; Details	(Virginia) Lexington, VA (Washington and Lee)	Cy Twombly Pool (swim); Virginia Military Institute (dive)	Kenyon (3)	299	Williams	197
1983; Details	(Ohio) Canton, OH	C.T. Branin Natatorium; Canton McKinley High School	Kenyon (4)	336½	Claremont–Mudd–Scripps	194
1984; Details	(Georgia (U.S. state)) Atlanta, GA (Emory)	George W. Woodruff Physical Education Center	Kenyon (5)	429½	Claremont–Mudd–Scripps	169
1985; Details	(Georgia (U.S. state)) Atlanta, GA (Emory)	George W. Woodruff Physical Education Center	Kenyon (6)	504	Claremont–Mudd–Scripps	409
1986; Details	(Ohio) Canton, OH	C.T. Branin Natatorium; Canton McKinley High School	Kenyon (7)	496	Claremont–Mudd–Scripps	372½
1987; Details	(Ohio) Canton, OH	C.T. Branin Natatorium; Canton McKinley High School	Kenyon (8)	480	Denison	338
1988; Details	(Georgia (U.S. state)) Atlanta, GA (Emory)	George W. Woodruff Physical Education Center	Kenyon (9)	552	Claremont–Mudd–Scripps	314
1989; Details	(Maine) Brunswick, ME (Bowdoin)	A. LeRoy Greason Swimming Pool	Kenyon (10)	630½	UC San Diego	486
1990; Details	(Wisconsin) Brown Deer, WI ([[]])	Schroeder Aquatic Center	Kenyon (11)	653½	UC San Diego	535½
1991; Details	(Georgia (U.S. state)) Atlanta, GA (Emory)	George W. Woodruff Physical Education Center	Kenyon (12)	593½	Claremont–Mudd–Scripps	280
1992; Details	(New York (state)) Buffalo, NY (Erie CC)	Flickinger Aquatic Center	Kenyon (13)	646	UC San Diego	361
1993; Details	(Georgia (U.S. state)) Atlanta, GA (Emory)	George W. Woodruff Physical Education Center	Kenyon (14)	552	UC San Diego	442½
1994; Details	(Massachusetts) Williamstown, MA (Williams)	John Wesley Chandler Athletic Center	Kenyon (15)	615½	UC San Diego	389½
1995; Details	(Ohio) Oxford, OH (Miami)	Corwin M. Nixon Aquatic Center	Kenyon (16)	687	Hope	295
1996; Details	(Georgia (U.S. state)) Atlanta, GA (Emory)	George W. Woodruff Physical Education Center	Kenyon (17)	572½	Denison	360
1997; Details	(Ohio) Oxford, OH (Miami)	Corwin M. Nixon Aquatic Center	Kenyon (18)	689½	UC San Diego	336
1998; Details	(Missouri) St. Peters, MO	St. Peters Rec-Plex	Kenyon (19)	726	UC San Diego	395
1999; Details	Minneapolis, MN (Minnesota)	University of Minnesota Aquatic Center	Kenyon (20)	670	Denison	382½
2000; Details	(Georgia (U.S. state)) Atlanta, GA (Emory)	George W. Woodruff Physical Education Center	Kenyon (21)	670½	Denison	317
2001; Details	(New York (state)) Buffalo, NY (Erie CC)	Flickinger Aquatic Center	Kenyon (22)	669	Emory	289½
2002; Details	(Ohio) Oxford, OH (Miami)	Corwin M. Nixon Aquatic Center	Kenyon (23)	589	Johns Hopkins	382
2003; Details	(Georgia (U.S. state)) Atlanta, GA (Emory)	George W. Woodruff Physical Education Center	Kenyon (24)	756½	Johns Hopkins	384½
2004; Details	(Missouri) St. Peters, MO	St. Peters Rec-Plex	Kenyon (25)	678½	Emory	446
2005; Details	(Michigan) Holland, MI	Holland Community Aquatic Center	Kenyon (26)	556½	Emory	404½
2006; Details	Minneapolis, MN (Minnesota)	University of Minnesota Aquatic Center	Kenyon (27)	498	Denison	345
2007; Details	(Texas) Houston, TX (Houston)	Campus Recreation and Wellness Center Natatorium	Kenyon (28)	570	Denison	351
2008; Details	(Ohio) Oxford, OH (Miami)	Corwin M. Nixon Aquatic Center	Kenyon (29)	635	Johns Hopkins	330
2009; Details	Minneapolis, MN (Minnesota)	University of Minnesota Aquatic Center	Kenyon (30)	604	Emory	402
2010; Details	Minneapolis, MN (Minnesota)	University of Minnesota Aquatic Center	Kenyon (31)	696	Denison	272
2011; Details	Knoxville, TN (Tennessee)	University of Tennessee, Allan Jones Aquatic Center	Denison	500½	Kenyon	499½
2012; Details	Indianapolis, IN (Indiana)	Indiana University Natatorium	Denison (2)	600	Kenyon	519
2013; Details	(Texas) Shenandoah, TX	Conroe Independent School District Natatorium	Kenyon (32)	499½	Denison	428
2014; Details	Indianapolis, IN (Indiana)	Indiana University Natatorium	Kenyon (33)	480	Denison	472
2015; Details	(Texas) Shenandoah, TX	Conroe Independent School District Natatorium	Kenyon (34)	468	Denison	383
2016; Details	(North Carolina) Greensboro, NC	Greensboro Aquatic Center	Denison (3)	455.5	Kenyon	418.5
2017; Details	(Texas) Shenandoah, TX	Conroe Independent School District Natatorium	Emory (1)	438	Kenyon	384
2018; Details	(Indiana) Indianapolis, IN (Franklin)	Indiana University Natatorium	Denison (4)	596.5	Emory	369.5
2019; Details	(North Carolina) Greensboro, NC	Greensboro Aquatic Center	Denison (5)	562.5	Emory	447.5
2020	Cancelled due to the coronavirus pandemic					
2021	Cancelled due to the coronavirus pandemic					
2022; Details	(Indiana) Indianapolis, IN (Franklin)	Indiana University Natatorium	Emory (2)	427.5	Johns Hopkins	340
2023; Details	(North Carolina) Greensboro, NC (ODAC)	Greensboro Aquatic Center	Emory (3)	532	Kenyon	495.5
2024; Details	(North Carolina) Greensboro, NC (ODAC)	Greensboro Aquatic Center	Emory (4)	434	Kenyon	391
2025; Details	(North Carolina) Greensboro, NC (ODAC)	Greensboro Aquatic Center	Denison (6)	463.5	Emory	323.5
2026; Details	(Indiana) Indianapolis, IN (Franklin)	Indiana University Natatorium	Denison (7)	437	NYU	388.5
2027	(Indiana) Indianapolis, IN (Franklin)	Indiana University Natatorium				
2028	(Indiana) Indianapolis, IN (Franklin)	Indiana University Natatorium				

== Champions ==
Team national championships among active programs: 34, 6, 3, 3, 1

=== Active programs ===
Team	Titles	Years
Kenyon	34	1980, 1981, 1982, 1983, 1984, 1985, 1986, 1987, 1988, 1989, 1990, 1991, 1992, 1993, 1994, 1995, 1996, 1997, 1998, 1999, 2000, 2001, 2002, 2003, 2004, 2005, 2006, 2007, 2008, 2009, 2010, 2013, 2014, 2015
Denison	7	2011, 2012, 2016, 2018, 2019, 2025, 2026
Emory	4	2017, 2022, 2023, 2024
Johns Hopkins	3	1977, 1978, 1979
St. Lawrence	1	1976

=== Former programs ===
Team	Titles	Years
Chico State	1	1975

== Championship records ==
Event	Time		Name	Club	Date	Location	Ref
50y freestyle	19.37	h	Oliver Smith	Emory	March 21, 2018	Indianapolis, Indiana	
100y freestyle	42.67		Jack Hill	(United Kingdom); Denison	March 21, 2026	Indianapolis, Indiana	
200y freestyle	1:33.94		Jack Hill	(United Kingdom); Denison	March 19, 2026	Indianapolis, Indiana	
500y freestyle	4:18.35		Arthur Conover	Kenyon	March 15, 2017	Shenandoah, Texas	
1650y freestyle	14:59.56		Arthur Conover	Kenyon	March 18, 2017	Shenandoah, Texas	
100y backstroke	45.75		Tanner Filion	Whitman	March 17, 2023	Greensboro, North Carolina	
200y backstroke	1:41.17		Tanner Filion	Whitman	March 18, 2023	Greensboro, North Carolina	
100y breaststroke	50.94		Andrew Wilson	Emory	March 17, 2017	Shenandoah, Texas	
200y breaststroke	1:50.80		Andrew Wilson	Emory	March 18, 2017	Shenandoah, Texas	
100y butterfly	45.85		Cooper Costello	Chicago	March 19, 2026	Indianapolis, Indiana	
200y butterfly	1:42.64		Justin Finkel	Connecticut	March 21, 2025	Greensboro, North Carolina	
200y individual medley	1:42.97		Derek Maas	NYU	March 20, 2024	Greensboro, North Carolina	
400y individual medley	3:46.62		Harrison Curley	Kenyon	March 19, 2015	Shenandoah, Texas	
4×50y freestyle relay	1:18.06		David Somers; Zach Turk; Ian Richardson; Curtis Ramsey	Kenyon	March 22, 2012	Indianapolis, Indiana	
4×100y freestyle relay	2:53.33		Cooper Costello (42.71); Alex Schwartz (44.48); (Australia) Ryan Lobo (44.10); John Butler (42.04)	Chicago	March 21, 2026	Indianapolis, Indiana	
4×200y freestyle relay	6:26.98		Nick Goudie (1:36.20); Benjamin Thorsen (1:36.56); Jason Hamilton (1:38.21); Pat Pema (1:36.01)	Emory	March 17, 2023	Greensboro, North Carolina	
4×200y freestyle relay	6:22.37		(United Kingdom) Jack Hill (1:34.35); George Goins (1:36.59); Harry Parsons (1:36.77); Nick Hensel (1:34.66)	Denison	March 20, 2026	Indianapolis, Indiana	
4×50y medley relay	1:25.85		Ryan Soh (21.90); Jake Meyer (23.54); Jeff Echols (21.15); Colin Lafave (19.26)	Emory	March 15, 2023	Greensboro, North Carolina	
4×100y medley relay	3:08.43		Timothy Johnson (48.32); Marrich Somridhivej (50.41); Nathaniel Oppenheim (47.48); Max Cory (42.22)	Bates	March 18, 2026	Indianapolis, Indiana	
1m Springboard	602.00		Israel Zavaleta	Kenyon	March 16, 2023	Greensboro, North Carolina	
3m Springboard	645.70		Connor Dignan	Denison	March 19, 2014	Indianapolis, Indiana	

Legend: # – Record awaiting ratification by NCAA;
Records not set in finals: h – heat; sf – semifinal; r – relay 1st leg; rh – relay heat 1st leg; b – B final; † – en route to final mark; so – swim-off; tt – time trial

== See also ==
- List of college swimming and diving teams
- NCAA Men's Swimming and Diving Championships (Division I, Division II)
- NCAA Women's Swimming and Diving Championships (Division I, Division II, Division III)
- NAIA men's swimming and diving championships
