= NCAA Division II women's swimming and diving championships =

American collegiate water sports tournament

- NCAA logo
- Association: NCAA
- Sport: Swimming and Diving
- Founded: 1982; 44 years ago
- Division: Division II
- Country: United States; Canada
- Most recent champion: Nova Southeastern (4th)
- Most titles: Drury (10)
- Broadcaster: ESPNU
- Website: NCAA.com

The NCAA Division II women's swimming and diving championships are contested at an annual swim meet hosted by the National Collegiate Athletic Association to determine the individual and team champions of women's collegiate swimming and diving among its Division II members in the United States and Canada. It has been held every year since 1982, except for 2020.

Drury have been the most successful program, with ten national titles.

Nova Southeastern are the four-time reigning national champions, winning their fourth title in 2026.

== History ==
Swimming was one of twelve women's sports added to the NCAA championship program for the 1981–82 school year, as the NCAA engaged in battle with the Association for Intercollegiate Athletics for Women for sole governance of women's collegiate sports. The AIAW continued to conduct its established championship program in the same twelve (and other) sports; however, after a year of dual women's championships, the NCAA conquered the AIAW and usurped its authority and membership.

== Format ==
The event consists of individual and team championships in a range of events, all held in a 25-yard pool.

=== Individual swimming events ===
- Freestyle events
  - 50-yard Freestyle (1982–present)
  - 100-yard Freestyle (1982–present)
  - 200-yard Freestyle (1982–present)
  - 500-yard Freestyle (1982–present)
  - 1,000-yard Freestyle (2001–present)
  - 1,650-yard Freestyle (1982−present)
- Backstroke events
  - 50-yard Backstroke (1982–1983)
  - 100-yard Backstroke (1982–present)
  - 200-yard Backstroke (1982–present)
- Breaststroke events
  - 50-yard Breaststroke (1982–1983)
  - 100-yard Breaststroke (1982–present)
  - 200-yard Breaststroke (1982–present)
- Butterfly events
  - 50-yard Butterfly (1982–1983)
  - 100-yard Butterfly (1982–present)
  - 200-yard Butterfly (1982–present)
- Medley events
  - 100-yard individual medley (1982–1983)
  - 200-yard individual medley (1982–present)
  - 400-yard individual medley (1982–present)

=== Relay swimming events ===
- Freestyle relay events
  - 200-yard freestyle relay (1982–present)
  - 400-yard freestyle relay (1982–present)
  - 800-yard freestyle relay (1982–present)
- Medley relay events
  - 200-yard medley relay (1982–present)
  - 400-yard medley relay (1982–present)

=== Diving events ===
- Diving events
  - One-meter diving (1982–present)
  - Three-meter diving (1982–present)

== Results ==
Year	Team Champion	Score	Team Runner-Up	Score	Location	Venue
1982; Details	Cal State Northridge	391	Vanderbilt	324	Clarion, Pennsylvania	
1983	Clarion	308	Air Force	299	Long Beach, California	Belmont Plaza Olympic Pool
1984	Clarion	345	Cal State Northridge	260	(New York (state)) Hempstead, New York	
1985	South Florida	492	Cal State Northridge	380½	Orlando, Florida	YMCA Aquatic Center
1986	Clarion	433	Tampa	343	Orlando, Florida	YMCA Aquatic Center
1987	Cal State Northridge	349	Clarion	274	Long Beach, California	Belmont Plaza Olympic Pool
1988	Cal State Northridge	441	Tampa	285	(New York (state)) Buffalo, New York	
1989	Cal State Northridge	397	North Dakota	280	(New York (state)) Buffalo, New York	
1990	Oakland	423	Cal State Northridge	419	(New York (state)) Buffalo, New York	
1991	Oakland	566½	Florida Atlantic	404	Milwaukee, Wisconsin	
1992	Oakland	621½	Northern Michigan	475	Grand Forks, North Dakota	
1993	Oakland	609	Clarion	406	Canton, Ohio	
1994	Oakland	630	Air Force	454½	Canton, Ohio	
1995	Air Force	690	Oakland	563	Canton, Ohio	
1996	Air Force	697½	Oakland	625	Grand Forks, North Dakota	
1997	Drury	690½	Oakland	460	San Antonio, Texas	
1998	Drury	578½	Cal State Bakersfield	386	Ashland, Ohio	
1999	Drury	613	North Dakota	603½	(New York (state)) Buffalo, New York	Flickinger Aquatic Center
2000	Drury	663	Truman	556	(New York (state)) Buffalo, New York	Flickinger Aquatic Center
2001	Truman	656	Drury	610½	Canton, Ohio	Branin Natatorium
2002	Truman	733	Drury	548	Orlando, Florida	YMCA Aquatic Center
2003	Truman	682	Drury	410	Grand Forks, North Dakota	
2004	Truman	641	Drury	561	(New York (state)) Buffalo, New York	Flickinger Aquatic Center
2005	Truman	579½	Drury	530	Orlando, Florida	YMCA Aquatic Center
2006	Truman	664	Drury	505	Indianapolis, Indiana	Indiana University Natatorium
2007	Drury	646½	Truman	518	(New York (state)) Buffalo, New York	Flickinger Aquatic Center
2008	Truman	461½	Drury	449	Columbia, Missouri	Mizzou Aquatic Center
2009	Drury	618½	Wayne State	453½	Houston, Texas	University of Houston Aquatic Center
2010	Drury	657	Wayne State	531	Canton, Ohio	Branin Natatorium
2011	Drury	483½	Wayne State	388	San Antonio, Texas	
2012	Wayne State	497	Drury	496	Mansfield, Texas	
2013	Drury	432½	Wayne State	388	Birmingham, Alabama	
2014	Drury	486	Wayne State	419	Geneva, Ohio	
2015	Queens	540½	Drury	489.5	Indianapolis, Indiana	Indiana University Natatorium
2016	Queens	567	Wingate	364½	Indianapolis, Indiana	Indiana University Natatorium
2017	Queens	467	Drury	385	Birmingham, Alabama	CrossPlex Natatorium
2018	Queens	574.5	Drury	401	Greensboro, North Carolina	Greensboro Aquatic Center
2019	Queens	707.5	Drury	345	Indianapolis, Indiana	Indiana University Natatorium
2020	Cancelled due to the coronavirus pandemic					
2021	Queens	695	Drury	441	Birmingham, Alabama	CrossPlex Natatorium
2022	Queens	536.5	Indy	423	Greensboro, North Carolina	Greensboro Aquatic Center
2023	Nova Southeastern	536.5	Indy	488.5	Indianapolis, Indiana	Indiana University Natatorium
2024	Nova Southeastern	487	Colorado Mesa	461.5	Geneva, Ohio	SPIRE Institute
2025	Nova Southeastern	475	Drury	463	Indianapolis, Indiana	Indiana University Natatorium
2026	Nova Southeastern	486	Tampa	424.5	Evansville, Indiana	Deaconess Aquatic Center

== Champions ==
Team national championships, by active programs: 10, 7, 4, 3, 1

=== Active programs ===
Team	Titles	Years
Drury	10	1997, 1998, 1999, 2000, 2007, 2009, 2010, 2011, 2013, 2014
Truman	7	2001, 2002, 2003, 2004, 2005, 2006, 2008
Nova Southeastern	4	2023, 2024, 2025, 2026
Clarion	3	1983, 1984, 1986
Wayne State (MI)	1	2012

=== Former programs ===
Team	Titles	Years
Queens (NC)	7	2015, 2016, 2017, 2018, 2019, 2021, 2022
Oakland	5	1990, 1991, 1992, 1993, 1994
Cal State Northridge	4	1982, 1987, 1988, 1989
Air Force	2	1995, 1996
South Florida	1	1985

== Championship records ==
Event	Time		Name	Club	Date	Location	Ref
50y freestyle	21.92	h	Bryn Greenwaldt	Augustana	March 12, 2025	Indianapolis, Indiana	
100y freestyle	48.07		Luna Mertins	Lynn	March 15, 2025	Indianapolis, Indiana	
200y freestyle	1:45.27		Patricia Castro	Spain; Queens	March 12, 2015	Indianapolis, Indiana	
500y freestyle	4:39.28		Patricia Castro	Spain; Queens	March 11, 2016	Indianapolis, Indiana	
1000y freestyle	9:38.98		Emily Trieschmann	Nova S'Eastern	March 13, 2024	Geneva, Ohio	
1650y freestyle	16:17.66		Kristen Frost	Southern Connecticut	March 15, 2008	Columbia, Missouri	
100y backstroke	50.91		Agata Naskret	Poland; West Florida	March 13, 2026	Evansville, Indiana	
200y backstroke	1:52.90		Agata Naskret	Poland; West Florida	March 14, 2026	Evansville, Indiana	
100y breaststroke	59.51		Theresa Michalak	Germany; West Florida	March 10, 2017	Birmingham, Alabama	
200y breaststroke	2:08.59		Jonette Laegreid	Drury	March 15, 2025	Indianapolis, Indiana	
100y butterfly	51.78		Luna Mertins	Lynn	March 13, 2025	Indianapolis, Indiana	
200y butterfly	1:55.98		Ann Carozza	West Chester	March 11, 2022	Greensboro, North Carolina	
200y individual medley	1:55.63		Patricia Castro	Spain; Queens	March 9, 2016	Indianapolis, Indiana	
400y individual medley	4:08.56		Patricia Castro	Spain; Queens	March 10, 2016	Indianapolis, Indiana	
4×50y freestyle relay	1:29.03		(Hungary) Zsofia Kurdi (22.55); (Sweden) Kristina Orban (22.10); (Sweden) Maxine Egner (22.18); Maya Esparza (22.20)	Nova S'Eastern	March 13, 2026	Evansville, Indiana	
4×100y freestyle relay	3:17.37		(Hungary) Zsofia Kurdi (49.31); (Sweden) Maxine Egner (49.17); (Sweden) Emilia Ronningdal (49.35); Maya Esparza (49.54)	Nova S'Eastern	March 14, 2026	Evansville, Indiana	
4×200y freestyle relay	7:08.50		(Sweden) Emilia Ronningdal (1:46.71); (Brazil) Rafaela Raurich (1:46.09); May Lowy (1:49.97); Emily Trieschmann (1:45.73)	Nova S'Eastern	March 12, 2024	Geneva, Ohio	
4×50y medley relay	1:37.95		(Sweden) Mollie Morfelt (25.48); Hannah Montgomery (27.49); (Sweden) Kristina Orban (23.10); Maya Esparza (21.88)	Nova S'Eastern	March 11, 2026	Evansville, Indiana	
4×100y medley relay	3:35.21		(Poland) Agata Naskret (51.24); (Russia) Shelly Prayson (1:01.08); Livia Rodrigues (53.31); (Estonia) Sofija Kendzior (49.58)	West Florida	March 12, 2026	Evansville, Indiana	
1m Springboard	511.55		Kayla Kelosky	Clarion	March 10, 2011	San Antonio, Texas	
3m Springboard	555.70		Elizabeth Rawlings	Queens	March 14, 2015	Indianapolis, Indiana	

Legend: # – Record awaiting ratification by NCAA; e – equalled existing record;
Records not set in finals: h – heat; sf – semifinal; r – relay 1st leg; rh – relay heat 1st leg; b – B final; † – en route to final mark; so – swim-off; tt – time trial

== See also ==
- NCAA women's swimming and diving championships (Division I, Division III)
- NCAA men's swimming and diving championships (Division I, Division II, Division III)
- AIAW Intercollegiate Women's Swimming and Diving Champions
- NAIA Women's Swimming and Diving Championships
- List of college swimming and diving teams
