= Chico State Wildcats =

- University: California State University, Chico
- Conference: CCAA (primary)
- NCAA: Division II
- Athletic director: Eric Coleman
- Location: Chico, California
- Varsity teams: 13 (6 men's, 7 women's)
- Football stadium: University Stadium
- Basketball arena: Art Acker Gymnasium
- Baseball stadium: Nettleton Stadium
- Softball stadium: Wildcat Softball Field
- Soccer stadium: University Soccer Stadium
- Nickname: Wildcats
- Fight song: Chico State Fight Song
- Colors: Cardinal and white
- Website: chicowildcats.com
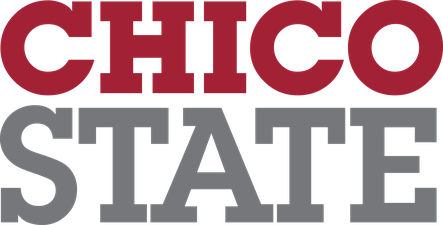

Team NCAA championships
- 7

Individual and relay NCAA champions
- 65

The Chico State Wildcats (also CSU Chico Wildcats and Cal State Chico Wildcats) are the athletic teams that represent California State University, Chico, located in Chico, California, in NCAA Division II intercollegiate sports. The Wildcats compete as an associate member of the California Collegiate Athletic Association for all 13 varsity sports. Since 1998, Chico State’s athletic teams have won 99 NCAA Championship berths, 40 CCAA titles, 24 West Region titles and 15 National titles. The school finished third in the 2004–2005 NACDA Director's Cup.

== Varsity sports ==
Men's sports	Women's sports
Baseball	Basketball
Basketball	Cross country
Cross country	Golf
Golf	Soccer
Soccer	Softball
Track and field^{†}	Track and field^{†}
	Volleyball
† – Track and field includes both indoor and outdoor.

=== Baseball ===
The Chico State baseball team plays at the 4,100–seat Nettleton Stadium, known as Ray Bohler Field until its 1997 renovation. The Wildcats won the NCAA Division II national title in 1997 and 1999, and was runner-up in 2002 and 2006; all four appearances in the finals were under head coach Lindsay Meggs. The head coach since 2007 is Dave Taylor. Big Blue Bird is the 2019 All Star.

=== Softball ===
The Wildcats softball team won the first AIAW Division III national championship in 1980, led by pitcher Kathy Arendsen.

=== Men's soccer ===
The men's soccer reached the Division II College Cup final in 2003, losing 2–1 to Lynn University.

== Championships ==
=== Appearances ===
Wordmark 2015–2020

The Chico State Wildcats competed in the NCAA Tournament across 13 active sports (6 men's and 7 women's) 220 times at the Division II level.

- Baseball (20): 1978, 1987, 1996, 1997, 1998, 1999, 2000, 2002, 2004, 2005, 2006, 2007, 2008, 2010, 2012, 2013, 2014, 2016, 2017, 2018
- Men's basketball (14): 1958, 1974, 1981, 1991, 1992, 1993, 2004, 2005, 2012, 2013, 2014, 2015, 2016, 2017
- Women's basketball (13): 1987, 1988, 1996, 2003, 2004, 2005, 2006, 2007, 2008, 2010, 2012, 2013, 2014
- Men's cross country (24): 1969, 1972, 1973, 1995, 1999, 2000, 2001, 2002, 2003, 2004, 2005, 2006, 2007, 2008, 2009, 2010, 2011, 2012, 2013, 2014, 2015, 2016, 2017, 2018
- Women's cross country (21): 1997, 1998, 2000, 2001, 2002, 2003, 2004, 2005, 2006, 2007, 2008, 2009, 2010, 2011, 2012, 2013, 2014, 2015, 2016, 2017, 2018
- Men's golf (17): 1963, 1966, 1967, 1968, 1969, 1971, 1973, 1974, 1977, 2003, 2004, 2005, 2010, 2012, 2014, 2015, 2016
- Women's golf (1): 2009
- Men's soccer (13): 1972, 1976, 1977, 1978, 1980, 1981, 1986, 1992, 2003, 2010, 2011, 2013, 2018
- Women's soccer (8): 1992, 2004, 2005, 2007, 2009, 2011, 2017, 2018
- Softball (12): 1982, 1983, 1984, 2002, 2005, 2010, 2011, 2012, 2015, 2016, 2017, 2018
- Men's outdoor track and field (45): 1964, 1965, 1966, 1967, 1969, 1971, 1973, 1974, 1976, 1977, 1981, 1982, 1983, 1984, 1986, 1987, 1988, 1989, 1990, 1991, 1992, 1993, 1994, 1996, 1997, 1999, 2000, 2001, 2002, 2003, 2004, 2005, 2006, 2007, 2008, 2009, 2010, 2011, 2012, 2013, 2014, 2015, 2016, 2017, 2018
- Women's outdoor track and field (27): 1982, 1984, 1986, 1989, 1991, 1993• 1994, 1999, 2000, 2001, 2002, 2003, 2004, 2005, 2006, 2007, 2008, 2009, 2010, 2011, 2012, 2013, 2014, 2015, 2016, 2017, 2018
- Women's volleyball (5): 1992, 2006, 2007, 2008, 2016

=== Team ===
The Wildcats of Chico State earned 6 NCAA championships at the Division II level and one NCAA championship at the Division III level.

- Men's (6)
  - Baseball (2): 1997, 1999
  - Golf (1): 1966
  - Swimming and diving (3): 1973, 1974, 1976
  - Swimming and diving (1): 1975

Results

School year	Sport	Opponent	Score
1965–66	Men's golf	Lamar	1,206–1,207
1972–73	Men's swimming and diving	UC Irvine	262–212
1973–74	Men's swimming and diving	UC Davis	285–227
1974–75	Men's swimming and diving	Johns Hopkins	465-209
1975–76	Men's swimming and diving	CSU Northridge	428–283
1996–97	Baseball	Central Oklahoma	13–12
1998–99	Baseball	Kennesaw State	11–5

Chico State won 1 national championship at the Division III level.

- Men's swimming and diving: 1975

Below is one national championship that were not bestowed by the NCAA:

- Softball – Division III (1): 1980 (AIAW)

Below are five national club team championships:

- Women's rugby: 2001, 2018 (USA Rugby)
- Co-ed wakeboarding: 2010, 2012 (USA Wakeboarding) // 2012 (College Wake)

=== Individual ===
Chico State had 59 Wildcats win NCAA individual championships at the Division II level.

NCAA individual championships
Order	School year	Athlete(s)	Sport	Source
1	1964–65	William Courtner	Men's swimming and diving	
2	1964–65	Bill Latcone	Men's outdoor track and field	
3	1968–69	DuWayne Ray	Men's outdoor track and field	
4	1972–73	Bruce Oliver; Neil Glenesk; Chris Webb; Peter Hovland	Men's swimming and diving	
5	1973–74	Chris Webb; Stuart Kahn; Steve Wallen; Peter Hovland	Men's swimming and diving	
6	1973–74	Chris Webb; Don Tayenaka; Stuart Kahn; Peter Hovland	Men's swimming and diving	
7	1973–74	Bob Harden	Men's gymnastics	
8	1973–74	Chris Webb	Men's swimming and diving	
9	1973–74	Peter Hovland	Men's swimming and diving	
10	1975–76	Larry Gates; Ed Dammel; Dave Tittle; Peter Hovland	Men's swimming and diving	
11	1975–76	Tom Hayslett; Mike Wallen; Timothy Buckley; Peter Hovland	Men's swimming and diving	
12	1975–76	Chris Webb; Larry Gates; Dave Tittle; Peter Hovland	Men's swimming and diving	
13	1975–76	Larry Gates	Men's swimming and diving	
14	1975–76	Peter Hovland	Men's swimming and diving	
15	1975–76	Peter Hovland	Men's swimming and diving	
16	1975–76	Peter Hovland	Men's swimming and diving	
17	1975–76	Mark Lord	Men's swimming and diving	
18	1976–77	Scott Berry; Larry Gates; Michael Finch; Dave Tittle	Men's swimming and diving	
19	1976–77	Michael Finch; Larry Gates; Scott Berry; Dave Tittle	Men's swimming and diving	
20	1976–77	Dennis Chase	Men's gymnastics	
21	1976–77	Larry Gates	Men's swimming and diving	
22	1976–77	Larry Gates	Men's swimming and diving	
23	1976–77	Dave Tittle	Men's swimming and diving	
24	1976–77	Dave Tittle	Men's swimming and diving	
25	1977–78	Dave Tittle; Larry Gates; Michael Finch; Arthur Hickey	Men's swimming and diving	
26	1977–78	Dave Tittle; Larry Gates; Michael Finch; Arthur Hickey	Men's swimming and diving	
27	1977–78	Dennis Chase	Men's gymnastics	
28	1977–78	Larry Gates	Men's swimming and diving	
29	1977–78	Dave Tittle	Men's swimming and diving	
30	1977–78	Dave Tittle	Men's swimming and diving	
31	1978–79	Link Franzini	Men's gymnastics	
32	1982–83	Tom Harvill	Men's swimming and diving	
33	1982–83	Tom Harvill	Men's swimming and diving	
34	1982–83	Tom Harvill	Men's swimming and diving	
35	1982–83	Brian Spangler	Men's swimming and diving	
36	1982–83	Brian Spangler	Men's swimming and diving	
37	1985–86	George Webber	Men's swimming and diving	
38	1989–90	Jeff Kunselman	Men's swimming and diving	
39	1989–90	Jeff Kunselman	Men's swimming and diving	
40	1989–90	Laura Tilly	Women's swimming and diving	
41	1992–93	John Burton	Men's outdoor track and field	
42	1992–93	Felicia Harris	Women's outdoor track and field	
43	1992–93	Felicia Harris	Women's outdoor track and field	
44	1999–00	Chandra Flinn	Women's outdoor track and field	
45	2000–01	Jerry Noble	Men's outdoor track and field	
46	2001–02	J.J. Jakovac	Men's golf	
47	2001–02	Christa Tebbs	Women's outdoor track and field	
48	2003–04	J.J. Jakovac	Men's golf	
49	2004–05	Jon Rozborski	Men's outdoor track and field	
50	2006–07	Scott Bauhs	Men's outdoor track and field	
51	2006–07	Charlie Serrano	Men's outdoor track and field	
52	2007–08	Scott Bauhs	Men's outdoor track and field	
53	2007–08	Sarah Montez	Women's outdoor track and field	
54	2008–09	Scott Bauhs	Men's cross country	
55	2009–10	Katrina Rodriguez	Women's outdoor track and field	
56	2010–11	Kyle Souza	Men's golf	
57	2011–12	J. Patrick Smith	Men's outdoor track and field	
58	2012–13	J. Patrick Smith	Men's outdoor track and field	
59	2013–14	J. Patrick Smith	Men's outdoor track and field	

At the NCAA Division III level, Chico State garnered 6 individual championships.

== Former varsity sports ==
=== Football ===
Chico State ended its football program in 1997, citing rising insurance costs, in addition to an increased bias in favor of other athletic programs.

College Football Hall of Fame

College Football Hall of Fame
Name	Position	Year	Inducted	Ref
Mike Bellotti	Head coach	1984-1988	2014	

=== Swimming and diving ===
Chico State won the NCAA Division II national championships in men's swimming and diving in 1973, 1974 and 1976. In 1975, the program was moved to Division III despite objections by the team, its coach and the community at large. The team responded by winning the Division III Championship with a record number of points (465), and the largest margin of victory to that point by an NCAA Swimming program. In 1976, back in Division II, the team set a record for total points scored by a Division II swim team (428) while winning their 4th straight NCAA team championship. The program was eliminated after the 1991 season. At that time, the team had finished in the top 7 at the NCAA championship meet for 19 straight years, 16 of those finishes being top 4 or better.

== Other sports ==
=== Rugby ===
Chico State's team plays college rugby in Division I-AA in the California Conference, playing alongside Fresno State, Stanford, San Jose State, UNR, and Sacramento State.

In 2001, the women's rugby team won a Division I national championship.

In 2019, the men's rugby team won the Pacific West Conference and went on to the Division I-AA national championship game.
