= NCAA Division II men's swimming and diving championships =

American collegiate water sports tournament

- NCAA logo
- Association: NCAA
- Sport: Swimming and Diving
- Founded: 1964; 62 years ago
- Division: Division II
- Region: United States; Canada
- Most recent champion: Tampa (2nd)
- Most titles: Cal State Bakersfield (13)
- Broadcaster: ESPNU
- Website: NCAA.com

The NCAA Division II men's swimming and diving championships (formerly the NCAA College Division swimming and diving championships) are contested at an annual swim meet hosted by the National Collegiate Athletic Association to determine the individual and team champions of men's collegiate swimming and diving among its Division II members in the United States and Canada.

The most successful program has been Cal State Bakersfield, with thirteen national titles (CSUB has since left Division II).

The reigning national champions are the Tampa, who won their second championship in 2026.

== Events ==
The NCAA Men's Division II Swimming and Diving Championships consist of 14 individual, 5 relay, and 2 diving events. Three relays and one individual event have been added since the first Championships in 1964. The 800-yard freestyle relay was introduced in 1966 and the 200-yard freestyle relay and the 200-yard medley relay were both introduced in 1989. The 1,000-yard freestyle was introduced in 2001 and Division II is the only NCAA division to offer it at its championships.

=== Individual swimming events ===
- Freestyle events
  - 50-yard freestyle
  - 100-yard freestyle
  - 200-yard freestyle
  - 500-yard freestyle
  - 1,000-yard freestyle
  - 1,650-yard freestyle
- Backstroke events
  - 100-yard backstroke
  - 200-yard Backstroke
- Breaststroke events
  - 100-yard breaststroke
  - 200-yard breaststroke
- Butterfly events
  - 100-yard butterfly
  - 200-yard butterfly
- Medley events
  - 200-yard individual medley
  - 400-yard individual medley

=== Team swimming events ===
- Team freestyle events
  - 200-yard freestyle relay
  - 400-yard freestyle relay
  - 800-yard freestyle relay
- Team medley events
  - 200-yard medley relay
  - 400-yard medley relay

=== Diving events ===
- Diving events
  - One-meter diving
  - Three-meter diving

== Results ==
NCAA Division II men's swimming and diving championships
Year	Championship Results				Location	Pool
Year	Winner	Points	Runners-up	Points	Location	Pool
NCAA College Division swimming and diving championships
1964; Details	Bucknell	83	East Carolina	50	Grove City, Pennsylvania	
1965	San Diego State	168½	Long Beach State	147	Normal, Illinois	Horton Pool
1966	San Diego State	243½	San Jose State	213	Normal, Illinois	Horton Pool
1967	UC Santa Barbara	255½	UC Irvine	246	Commerce, California	
1968	Long Beach State	349	Texas–Arlington	216	(Georgia (U.S. state)) Atlanta	
1969	UC Irvine	248	Kenyon	190	Springfield, Massachusetts	
1970	UC Irvine	230	Springfield	166	Rochester, Michigan	
1971	UC Irvine	242	South Florida	176	Springfield, Massachusetts	
1972	Eastern Michigan	222	UC Irvine; Cal State Northridge	164	Lexington, Virginia	
NCAA Division II swimming and diving championships
1973	Cal State Chico	262	UC Irvine	212	Detroit, Michigan	
1974	Cal State Chico	285	UC Davis	227	Long Beach, California	Belmont Plaza Olympic Pool
1975	Cal State Northridge	277	UC Irvine	210	Cleveland, Ohio	CSU Natatorium
1976	Cal State Chico	428	Cal State Northridge	283	Springfield, Massachusetts	
1977	Cal State Northridge	326	UC Irvine	305	Youngstown, Ohio	Beeghly Natatorium
1978	Cal State Northridge	304	Cal State Chico	282	Springfield, Massachusetts	
1979	Cal State Northridge	384	Oakland	170	Marquette, Michigan	PEIF Pool
1980	Oakland	312	Cal State Northridge	263	Youngstown, Ohio	Beeghly Natatorium
1981	Cal State Northridge	349	Oakland	338	Youngstown, Ohio	Beeghly Natatorium
NCAA Division II men's swimming and diving championships
1982	Cal State Northridge	444	Puget Sound	244½	Clarion, Pennsylvania	Waldo S. Tippin Natatorium
1983	Cal State Northridge	352½	Oakland	347½	Long Beach, California	Belmont Plaza Pool
1984	Cal State Northridge	319½	Oakland	226	(New York (state)) Hempstead, New York	Hofstra University Swim Center
1985	Cal State Northridge	488	Cal State Bakersfield	417½	Orlando, Florida	YMCA Aquatic Center
1986	Cal State Bakersfield	549	Cal State Northridge	438	Orlando, Florida	YMCA Aquatic Center
1987	Cal State Bakersfield	479½	Oakland	246	Long Beach, California	Belmont Plaza Pool
1988	Cal State Bakersfield	397	Oakland	344½	(New York (state)) Buffalo, New York	
1989	Cal State Bakersfield	571	Oakland	406	(New York (state)) Buffalo, New York	
1990	Cal State Bakersfield	830	Oakland	686	(New York (state)) Buffalo, New York	
1991	Cal State Bakersfield	853	Oakland	652	Milwaukee, Wisconsin	
1992	Cal State Bakersfield	910	Clarion	481	Grand Forks, North Dakota	Hyslop Sports Center Pool
1993	Cal State Bakersfield	951	Oakland	549½	Canton, Ohio	C.T. Branin Natatorium
1994	Oakland	791	Cal State Bakersfield	718½	Canton, Ohio	C.T. Branin Natatorium
1995	Oakland	890	Cal State Bakersfield	573	Canton, Ohio	C.T. Branin Natatorium
1996	Oakland	869½	Cal State Bakersfield	640	Grand Forks, North Dakota	Hyslop Sports Center Pool
1997	Oakland	767	Drury	623	San Antonio, Texas	
1998	Cal State Bakersfield	730	Drury	637	Ashland, Ohio	
1999	Drury	829	Cal State Bakersfield	557	(New York (state)) Buffalo, New York	Flickinger Aquatic Center
2000	Cal State Bakersfield	687	Drury	630	(New York (state)) Buffalo, New York	Flickinger Aquatic Center
2001	Cal State Bakersfield	621	Drury	562½	Canton, Ohio	C.T. Branin Natatorium
2002	Cal State Bakersfield	529	North Dakota	507	Orlando, Florida	YMCA Aquatic Center
2003	Drury	612	Cal State Bakersfield	535	Grand Forks, North Dakota	Hyslop Sports Center Pool
2004	Cal State Bakersfield	718½	Drury	586	(New York (state)) Buffalo, New York	Flickinger Aquatic Center
2005	Drury	726	Cal State Bakersfield	480	Orlando, Florida	YMCA Aquatic Center
2006	Drury	649	Cal State Bakersfield	543½	Indianapolis, Indiana	Indiana University Natatorium
2007	Drury	521½	North Dakota	500	(New York (state)) Buffalo, New York	Flickinger Aquatic Center
2008	Drury	523½	Missouri S&T	336	Columbia, Missouri	Mizzou Aquatic Center
2009	Drury	543	Wayne State	504½	Houston, Texas	CRWC Natatorium
2010	Drury	538	Incarnate Word	403	Canton, Ohio	C.T. Branin Natatorium
2011	Drury	600½	UC San Diego	345	San Antonio, Texas	Palo Alto Natatorium
2012	Drury	473	UC San Diego	400	Mansfield, Texas	Mansfield ISD Natatorium
2013	Drury	546	Florida Southern	397	Birmingham, Alabama	CrossPlex Natatorium
2014	Drury	569½	Florida Southern	361	Geneva, Ohio	SPIRE Institute
2015	Queens	433½	Drury	417.5	Indianapolis, Indiana	Indiana University Natatorium
2016	Queens	449	Lindenwood	382.5	Indianapolis, Indiana	Indiana University Natatorium
2017	Queens	563.5	Drury	350	Birmingham, Alabama	CrossPlex Natatorium
2018	Queens	558	Cal Baptist	307	Greensboro, North Carolina	Greensboro Aquatic Center
2019	Queens	606	Delta State	364.5	Indianapolis, Indiana	Indiana University Natatorium
2020	Cancelled due to the coronavirus pandemic					
2021	Queens	561	Indianapolis (Note: Drury originally were the runners-up, but were later disqualified for violating NCAA rules. Indianapolis were moved up to second place.)	369	Birmingham, Alabama	CrossPlex Natatorium
2022	Queens	607.5	Drury	522	Greensboro, North Carolina	Greensboro Aquatic Center
2023	Indianapolis	527	Drury	450.5	Indianapolis, Indiana	Indiana University Natatorium
2024	Tampa	473	Drury	409	Geneva, Ohio	SPIRE Institute
2025	No winner (Note: Drury originally won the championship, but were later stripped of the title after a member of the team failed a doping test. The title became vacant.)	-	Tampa	451	Indianapolis, Indiana	Indiana University Natatorium
2026	Tampa	522.5	Drury	509	Evansville, Indiana	Deaconess Aquatic Center

== Champions ==
Team national championships among active programs: 12, 3, 2, 1

=== Active programs ===
Team	Titles	Years
Drury	12	1999, 2003, 2005, 2006, 2007, 2008, 2009, 2010, 2011, 2012, 2013, 2014
Chico State	3	1973, 1974, 1976
Tampa	2	2024, 2026
Indianapolis	1	2023

=== Former programs ===
Team	Titles	Years
Cal State Bakersfield	13	1986, 1987, 1988, 1989, 1990, 1991, 1992, 1993, 1998, 2000, 2001, 2002, 2004
Cal State Northridge	9	1975, 1977, 1978, 1979, 1981, 1982, 1983, 1984, 1985
Queens (NC)	7	2015, 2016, 2017, 2018, 2019, 2021, 2022
Oakland	5	1980, 1994, 1995, 1996, 1997
UC Irvine	3	1969, 1970, 1971
San Diego State	2	1965, 1966
Eastern Michigan	1	1972
Long Beach State	1	1968
UC Santa Barbara	1	1967
Bucknell	1	1964

== Championship records ==
Event	Time	Name	Club	Date	Location	Ref
50y freestyle	18.88	Matej Dusa	Slovakia; Queens	March 9, 2022	Greensboro, North Carolina	
100y freestyle	41.25	Karol Ostrowski	Poland; Drury	March 20, 2021	Birmingham, Alabama	
200y freestyle	1:32.40	Volodymyr Gavrysh	Ukraine; McKendree	March 12, 2026	Evansville, Indiana	
500y freestyle	4:14.35	Jacob Hamlin	Tampa	March 13, 2026	Evansville, Indiana	
1000y freestyle	8:47.23	Jacob Hamlin	Tampa	March 12, 2025	Indianapolis, Indiana	
1650y freestyle	14:51.81	Jacob Hamlin	Tampa	March 15, 2025	Indianapolis, Indiana	
100y backstroke	45.09	Marius Kusch	Germany; Queens	March 15, 2019	Indianapolis, Indiana	
200y backstroke	1:40.34	Benjamin Sampson	Colorado Mesa	March 16, 2024	Geneva, Ohio	
100y breaststroke	51.59	Jeremias Pock	Germany; Indy	March 13, 2026	Evansville, Indiana	
200y breaststroke	1:51.12	Jeremias Pock	Germany; Indy	March 14, 2026	Evansville, Indiana	
100y butterfly	44.32	Marius Kusch	Germany; Queens	March 14, 2019	Indianapolis, Indiana	
200y butterfly	1:40.75	Jackson Lustig	McKendree	March 10, 2023	Indianapolis, Indiana	
200y individual medley	1:41.61	Marius Kusch	Germany; Queens	March 14, 2018	Greensboro, North Carolina	
400y individual medley	3:40.22	Benjamin Sampson	Colorado Mesa	March 14, 2024	Geneva, Ohio	
200y freestyle relay	1:16.50	(The Bahamas) Lamar Taylor (19.10); Jack Armstrong (18.56); Jase Pinckney (19.17); (Poland) Patryk Dabrowski (19.67)	Henderson St.	March 15, 2024	Geneva, Ohio	
400y freestyle relay	2:49.98	(Germany) Marius Kusch (42.01); Alex Kunert (42.32); (Croatia) Alen Mosic (42.84); Brody Heck (42.81)	Queens	March 16, 2019	Indianapolis, Indiana	
800y freestyle relay	6:16.64	Barnabas Fluck (1:35.58); Joshua Noll (1:34.60); Jacob Hamlin (1:33.32); Nicholas Cavic (1:33.14)	Tampa	March 10, 2026	Evansville, Indiana	
200y medley relay	1:24.15	(Germany) Maurice Grabowski (20.99); (Israel) Maxim Tsyfarov (23.46); (Russia) Vitaly Kostin (20.53); (France) Enzo Constable (19.17)	Lynn	March 11, 2026	Evansville, Indiana	
400y medley relay	3:06.12	Camille Trinquesse (47.43); (Germany) Jeremias Pock (50.35); (Denmark) Elias Noe (45.55); Zachary Anthony (42.79)	Indy	March 12, 2026	Evansville, Indiana	
1m Springboard	618.70	Dario Di Fazio	Oakland	March 10, 1994	Canton, Ohio	
3m Springboard	645.15	Julio Osuna Kelly	Indy	March 15, 2024	Geneva, Ohio	

Legend: # – Record awaiting ratification by National Collegiate Athletic Association; e – equalled existing record;
Records not set in finals: h – heat; sf – semifinal; r – relay 1st leg; rh – relay heat 1st leg; b – B final; † – en route to final mark; so – swim-off; tt – time trial

== See also ==
- List of college swimming and diving teams
- NCAA Men's Swimming and Diving Championships (Division I, Division III)
- NCAA Women's Swimming and Diving Championships (Division I, Division II, Division III)
- NAIA men's swimming and diving championships
