= Henry Parsons =

Henry Parsons may refer to:

- Henry Parsons (Massachusetts politician) (fl. 1897–1909), mayor of Marlborough, Massachusetts
- Henry Parsons (English politician) (1687–1739), MP for Lostwithiel and Maldon
