= Harry Parsons (Australian footballer) =

Australian rules footballer

Personal information
- Full name: Harrie Ritchie Parsons
- Born: 8 October 1884; Buninyong, Victoria
- Died: 12 June 1952 (aged 67); Caulfield, Victoria
- Original team: Buninyong
- Height: 178 cm (5 ft 10 in)
- Weight: 76 kg (168 lb)

Playing career^{1}
Years	Club	Games (Goals)
1906, 1908	St Kilda	13 (3)
- ^{1} Playing statistics correct to the end of 1908.

Harry Parsons (8 October 1884 – 12 June 1952) was an Australian rules footballer who played with St Kilda in the Victorian Football League (VFL).
