= NCAA Division III =

Division of the National Collegiate Athletic Association

NCAA Division III (D-III) is the lowest division of the National Collegiate Athletic Association (NCAA) in the United States. D-III consists of athletic programs at colleges and universities that do not offer athletic scholarships to student-athletes.

The NCAA's first split was into two divisions, the University and College Divisions, in 1956. The College Division was formed for smaller schools that did not have the resources of the major athletic programs across the country. The College Division split again in 1973 when the NCAA went to its current naming convention: Division I, Division II, and Division III. D-I and D-II schools are allowed to offer athletic scholarships, while D-III schools are not.

D-III is the NCAA's largest division with around 450 member institutions, which are 80% private and 20% public. The median undergraduate enrollment of D-III schools is about 2,750, although the range is from 418 to over 38,000. Approximately 40% of all NCAA student-athletes compete in D-III.

== Requirements ==
D-III institutions must sponsor at least three team sports for each sex/gender, with each playing season represented by each gender. Teams in which men and women compete together are counted as men's teams for sports sponsorship purposes. In a feature unique to D-III, the total number of required sports varies with each school's full-time undergraduate enrollment. Schools with an enrollment of 1,000 or less must sponsor five men's and five women's sports; those with larger enrollments must sponsor six for each sex/gender. Institutions that sponsor athletic programs for only one sex/gender (single-sex schools, plus a few historically all-female schools that are now coeducational) need only meet the sponsorship requirements for that sex. There are minimum contest rules and participant minimums for each sport.

D-III athletic programs are non-revenue-generating, extracurricular programs that are staffed and funded like any other university department. They feature student-athletes who receive no financial aid related to their athletic ability. Student-athletes cannot redshirt as freshmen, and schools may not use endowments or funds whose primary purpose is to benefit athletic programs.

D-III schools "shall not award financial aid to any student on the basis of athletics leadership, ability, participation or performance". Financial aid given to athletes must be awarded under the same procedures as for the general student body, and the proportion of total financial aid given to athletes "shall be closely equivalent to the percentage of student-athletes within the student body". The ban on scholarships is strictly enforced. As an example of how seriously the NCAA takes this rule, in 2005 MacMurray College became only the fifth school punished with a "death penalty" – a ban from competition – after its men's tennis program gave grants to foreign-born players. The two service academies that are D-III members, Merchant Marine and Coast Guard, do not violate the athletic scholarship ban because all students, whether or not they are varsity athletes, receive the same treatment, a full scholarship.

Another aspect that distinguishes D-III from the other NCAA divisions is that D-III institutions are specifically banned from using the National Letter of Intent, or any other pre-enrollment form that is not executed by other prospective students at the school. The NCAA provides for one exception—a standard, nonbinding celebratory signing form that may be signed by the student upon their acceptance of enrollment. However, this form cannot be signed at the campus of that college, and staff members of that college cannot be present at the signing.

== Conferences ==
=== All-sports conferences ===
An "all-sports conference" is defined here as one that sponsors both men's and women's basketball. While the NCAA has a much more detailed definition of the term, every NCAA conference (regardless of division) that sponsors basketball meets the organization's requirements for "all-sports" status.

- Allegheny Mountain Collegiate Conference (Note: Conference does not sponsor football.)
- American Rivers Conference (Note: Conference sponsors football.)
- American Southwest Conference
- Atlantic East Conference (Note: Disbanding at the end of the 2026–27 school year, with two of its final members joining the City University of New York Athletic Conference and the other four joining the United East Conference.)
- Centennial Conference
- City University of New York Athletic Conference
- Coast to Coast Athletic Conference
- College Conference of Illinois and Wisconsin
- Collegiate Conference of the South
- Conference of New England
- Empire 8 Conference
- Great Northeast Athletic Conference
- Heartland Collegiate Athletic Conference
- Landmark Conference
- Liberty League
- Little East Conference
- Massachusetts State Collegiate Athletic Conference
- Michigan Intercollegiate Athletic Association
- Middle Atlantic Conferences (Note: The Middle Atlantic Conferences (MAC) is an umbrella organization that operates three separate leagues. Two of these, the MAC Commonwealth and MAC Freedom, sponsor competition in the same set of 14 sports, including men's and women's basketball, but not football. The third league, known as the Middle Atlantic Conference (singular), sponsors competition in football and 12 other sports.)
- Midwest Conference
- Minnesota Intercollegiate Athletic Conference
- New England Small College Athletic Conference
- New England Women's and Men's Athletic Conference
- New Jersey Athletic Conference
- North Atlantic Conference
- North Coast Athletic Conference
- Northern Athletics Collegiate Conference
- Northwest Conference
- Ohio Athletic Conference
- Old Dominion Athletic Conference
- Presidents' Athletic Conference
- Skyline Conference
- Southern Athletic Association
- Southern California Intercollegiate Athletic Conference
- Southern Collegiate Athletic Conference
- St. Louis Intercollegiate Athletic Conference
- State University of New York Athletic Conference
- United East Conference
- University Athletic Association
- Upper Midwest Athletic Conference
- USA South Athletic Conference
- Wisconsin Intercollegiate Athletic Conference

=== Single-sport conferences ===
Ice hockey

- Northern Collegiate Hockey Association (men and women)
- United Collegiate Hockey Conference (men and women)

Lacrosse

- Coastal Lacrosse Conference (men only)

Men's volleyball

- Continental Volleyball Conference
- Midwest Collegiate Volleyball League

=== Independents ===
- Division III independent schools

== Division III Championships ==
NCAA Division III currently awards 28 national team championships yearly – 14 women's and 14 men's. Sports sanctioned by NCAA Division III include the following: baseball (men), basketball, cross country, field hockey (women), football (men), golf, ice hockey, lacrosse, rowing (women), soccer, softball (women), swimming and diving, tennis, track and field (indoor and outdoor), volleyball (indoor), and wrestling (men). Women's wrestling, which became an official NCAA championship sport in 2025–26, will hold a separate D-III championship starting in 2027–28.

Sport	Men	Women
Baseball	1976– (Note: Combined with Division II from 1974-1975.)	—N/a
Basketball	1975– (Note: Combined with Division II in 1974.)	1982–
Cross Country	1973–	1981–
Field Hockey	—N/a	1981–
Football	1973–	—N/a
Golf	1975– (Note: Combined with Division II in 1974.)	2000– (Note: Combined with Divisions I and II from 1982-1995 and combined with Division II only from 1996–1999.)
Ice Hockey	1984– (Note: Combined with Divisions I and II from 1974–1977 and combined with Division II only from 1978–1983.)	2002– (Note: Combined with Divisions I & II in 2001.)
Lacrosse	1980– (Note: Combined with Division II from 1974–1979.)	1985– (Note: Combined with Divisions I & II from 1982–1984.)
Rowing	—N/a	2002– (Note: Combined with Divisions I & II from 1997–2001.)
Soccer	1974–	1986– (Note: Combined with Divisions I & II in from 1982–1985.)
Softball	—N/a	1982–
Swimming & Diving	1975– (Note: Combined with Division II in 1974.)	1982–
Tennis	1976– (Note: Combined with Division II in 1974–75.)	1982–
Track & Field (Indoor)	1985– (Note: Combined with Divisions I & II from 1974–1984.)	1985; 1987– (Note: Combined with Divisions I & II from 1983–1984 and 1986.)
Track & Field (Outdoor)	1974–	1982–
Volleyball (Indoor)	2012– (Note: Combined with Divisions I & II from 1970-2011.)	1981–
Wrestling	1974–	2028– (Note: Combined with Divisions I and II from 2026–2027.)

=== Combined Championships with Divisions I & II ===
The NCAA sponsors an additional 11 championships—6 women's, 3 men's, and 2 coeducational, with competing Division III programs. Two more championships of this type, both for women, will be added in the 2026–27 school year. Division III programs currently compete against Division I and/or II programs including bowling (women), fencing, gymnastics, rifle (coeducational), skiing (coeducational), beach volleyball (women), water polo, and wrestling (women). From 2026 to 2027, acrobatics & tumbling and the cheerleading discipline of stunt will also use this format. The dates of the first championship reflect the first year of Division III competition, not necessarily the first year of overall competition for the sport.

Sport	Men	Women	Co-ed
Acrobatics & tumbling	—N/a	2027– (Note: Combined with Divisions I & II.)	—N/a
Bowling	—N/a	2004– (Note: Combined with Divisions I & II through 2027, after which Division II will hold its own championship.)	—N/a
Fencing	1974–1989, 2026–	1974–1989, 2026–	—N/a (Note: Fencing was a coeducational sport from 1990-2025.)
Gymnastics	1974–	1982–	—N/a
Rifle	—N/a	—N/a	1980–
Skiing	—N/a (Note: Skiing was a men's sport from 1974-1982 before the introduction of women's sports in the 1982-83 season.)	—N/a	1983–
Stunt	—N/a	2027–	—N/a
Volleyball (beach)	—N/a	2016–	—N/a
Water polo	1973–	2001–	—N/a
Wrestling	—N/a	2026– (Note: Combined with Divisions I and II through 2027, after which Division III will hold its own championship.)	—N/a

== D-III schools with D-I programs ==
Ten D-III schools currently field Division I programs in one or two sports, one maximum for each gender. These schools are allowed to offer athletic scholarships only for their D-I men's and women's sports.

Five of them are schools that traditionally competed at the highest level of a particular men's sport prior to the institution of the three division classifications in 1973, a decade before the NCAA governed women's sports. These five colleges (plus three others that later chose to return their D-I programs to D-III) were granted a waiver (or grandfather clause) in 1983 to continue offering scholarships, a waiver that was reaffirmed in 2004. Presumably due to Title IX considerations, grandfathered schools are also allowed to field one women's sport in D-I, and all five schools choose to do so.

- Clarkson University (men's and women's ice hockey)
- Colorado College (men's ice hockey and women's soccer)
- Johns Hopkins University (men's and women's lacrosse)
- Rensselaer Polytechnic Institute (men's and women's ice hockey)
- St. Lawrence University (men's and women's ice hockey)

Three formerly grandfathered schools moved completely to D-III. The State University of New York at Oneonta, which had been grandfathered in men's soccer, moved totally to D-II in 2006. Rutgers University–Newark, which had been grandfathered in men's volleyball, did the same in 2014. Hartwick College, which had been grandfathered in men's soccer and women's water polo, moved its men's soccer program to D-III in 2018 and dropped women's water polo entirely.

Until 2022, the other five schools that chose to field D-I programs in one sport for men and/or one sport for women after the original grandfather clause went into effect, so they were not grandfathered and thus were not allowed to offer athletic scholarships. This however changed in 2022 when the NCAA D-III membership voted to apply Division I legislation to its Division I programs. Academic-based and need-based financial aid are still available, as is the case for all of D-III.

- Franklin and Marshall College (men's wrestling)
- Hobart College (men's lacrosse)
- Massachusetts Institute of Technology (women's rowing)
- Rochester Institute of Technology (men's and women's ice hockey)
- Union College (men's and women's ice hockey)

In addition, Lawrence University was formerly a non-grandfathered program in fencing, but the NCAA no longer conducts a separate D-I fencing championship. Lawrence continues to field a fencing team, but that team is now considered D-III (see below).

In August 2011, the NCAA decided to no longer allow individual programs to move to another division as a general policy. One exception was made in 2012, when Rochester Institute of Technology (RIT) successfully argued for a one-time opportunity for colleges with a D-I men's team to add a women's team.

Since no more colleges would be allowed to move individual sports to D-I, the five non-scholarship programs (led by RIT and Union) petitioned to be allowed to offer scholarships in the interests of competitive equity. D-III membership voted in January 2022 to extend the grandfather clause to allow all ten colleges to offer athletic scholarships, effective immediately.

Football and basketball may not be D-I programs at D-III institutions, because their revenue-enhancing potential would give them an unfair advantage over other D-III schools. In 1992, several D-I schools playing D-III football were forced to bring their football programs into D-I, following the passage of the "Dayton Rule" (named after the University of Dayton, whose success in D-III football was seen as threatening the "ethos" of Division III sports). This led directly to the creation of the Pioneer Football League, a non-scholarship football-only Division I FCS conference.

== D-III schools playing in non-divisional sports ==
In addition to the D-III schools with teams that play as D-I members, many other D-III schools have teams that compete alongside D-I and D-II members in sports that the NCAA does not split into divisions. Teams in these sports are not counted as playing in a different division from the rest of the athletic program. D-III members cannot award scholarships in these sports.

== Reforms ==
In 2003, concerned about the disparity of some D-III athletic programs and the focus on national championships, the D-III Presidents' Council, led by Middlebury College President John McCardell, proposed ending the athletic scholarship exemptions for D-I programs, eliminating redshirting, and limiting the length of the traditional and non-traditional seasons. At the January 2004 NCAA convention, an amendment allowed the exemption for grandfathered D-I athletic scholarships to remain in place, but the rest of the reforms passed.

== Inclusion programs ==
D-III announced the creation of a LGBTQ inclusion program in 2019 known as the LGBTQ OneTeam Program. The program has facilitators from more than 40 colleges across the country, including Smith College, Agnes Scott College, and more. The group publicly condemned laws trying to limit transgender people in sports in 2021. A member of the program – Rhea Debussy who is a transgender rights activist – publicly left after changes to the NCAA's transgender policy in 2022.

== See also ==
- List of NCAA Division III institutions
