= St. Lawrence Saints =

Sports programs at St. Lawrence University

- University: St. Lawrence University
- Association: Division III
- Conference: Liberty League (primary); ECAC Hockey; EISA (skiing)
- Athletic director: Bob Durocher
- Location: Canton, New York
- Varsity teams: 33
- Football stadium: Leckonby Stadium
- Arena: Burkman Gymnasium
- Baseball stadium: Tom Fay Baseball Field
- Other venues: Appleton Arena
- Nickname: Saints
- Colors: Scarlet and brown
- Website: saintsathletics.com

The St. Lawrence Saints are composed of 33 teams representing St. Lawrence University in intercollegiate athletics, including men and women's alpine skiing, basketball, cross country, golf, ice hockey, lacrosse, Nordic skiing, riding, rowing, soccer, squash, swimming, tennis, and track and field. Men's sports include baseball and football. Women's sports include field hockey, softball, and volleyball. The Saints compete in the NCAA Division III and are members of the Liberty League for all sports except ice hockey, and men's tennis which competes in NCAA Division I.

== History ==
The St. Lawrence University Saints are a member of the Liberty League Athletic Conference, has ECACHL Division I Hockey Teams and fields 32 varsity teams (15 for men, 17 for women) and includes over 40% of the student body. The Skating Saints Men's team has twice played for Division I national championships (1961, 1988). The Men's soccer program went undefeated at 22–0 to capture the 1999 Division III soccer championship, and women's basketball narrowly was defeated in the 2002 NCAA Women's Division III Basketball Championship.

The Men's Squash team has had consistent success nationally. In December 2014, the men's squash team rose to the rank of the #1 in the College Squash Association national rankings after beating then #1 Harvard University on December 6, 2014. That same season, the Men's Squash team advanced to the College Squash Association's Potter Cup Men's national championship match, which was the first and only time the St. Lawrence Men's Squash team has reached the national championship. They were defeated in the final by Trinity College (CT), securing a #2 final national ranking for the 2014–15 season, the highest in school history.

The Men's Swim team won the 1976 D-3 National Championship. The St. Lawrence Equestrian Team was National Champion in 1973, 1976, 1977 and National Champion runner-up in 2001 and 2008. In addition the SLU Equestrian Team was Regional Champion in 2001, 2003, 2005, 2006, 2008, 2009 and 2011. The St. Lawrence University Wrestling Team won the Division III NCAA Championship in 1988. The wrestling team was discontinued in 1995.

In 2009 Women's Cross Country team placed second at nationals and in 2010 the Women's Track and Field team placed third at Indoor nationals, bringing home two individual national titles as well. The university sponsors teams for Men's Football and Baseball, Women's Field Hockey, Volleyball and Softball, and Men's and Women's Basketball, Men and Women's Lacrosse, Cross Country, Golf, Crew, Ice Hockey, Riding, Alpine and Nordic Skiing, Soccer, Squash, Swimming, Tennis and Track and Field. The university has a strong active rivalry (especially in Hockey) with nearby Clarkson University only 10 miles (16 km) away in Potsdam, NY.

Other notable rivalries include Hobart and William Smith, also from the Liberty League. The Nordic and Alpine Ski teams are also one of tradition. They compete in EISA with Division-I and Division-III schools.

Intramurals are also a popular option for students. With broomball being one of the more popular. It is similar to hockey and played in the rink, the players use "brooms" to score by putting a small round ball in the oppositions net. The university also has a rafting/canoeing shack located at the edge of campus.

== Teams ==
Men's sports	Women's sports
Alpine skiing	Alpine skiing
Baseball	Basketball
Basketball	Cross country
Cross country	Field hockey
Football	Golf
Golf	Ice hockey
Ice hockey	Lacrosse
Lacrosse	Nordic skiing
Nordic skiing	Riding
Riding	Rowing
Rowing	Soccer
Soccer	Softball
Squash	Squash
Swimming	Swimming
Tennis	Tennis
Track and field	Track and field
	Volleyball

== National championships ==
The Saints have won one team NCAA national championship.

=== Team ===
Association	Division	Sport	Year	Opponent/Runner-up	Score
NCAA (1)	Division III (1)	Men's swimming and diving (1)	1976	Johns Hopkins	249–233 (+16)

== Athletic facilities ==
Indoor facilities include two field houses with track and three tennis courts; two regulation basketball courts; competition swimming and diving pool; ten squash courts; fitness center and weight room; climbing wall; ice arena; equestrian arena. Outdoor facilities include competition and practice fields for soccer, softball, baseball, football, lacrosse and field hockey along with a lighted artificial turf field; six lighted tennis courts; lighted all weather track and lighted football/track stadium; 18-hole championship golf course and a boathouse on the St. Lawrence River in Waddington. Recreation facilities include jogging/walking trail, cross country/mountain bike trails, intramural fields, outdoor basketball and volleyball courts. Since 1996 the almost all of the athletic facilities have been renovated, replaced or recently constructed. In 2008 the Princeton Review ranked St. Lawrence with the 20th best athletic facilities in the country and was the only Division III institution ranked.
