= NAIA men's bowling invitational championship =

American bowling tournament

- Sport: College bowling
- Founded: 2011
- Country: United States
- Most titles: Robert Morris (IL) (4)
- Website: NAIA.com

The NAIA Men's Bowling Invitational Tournament was an annual tournament hosted by the National Association of Intercollegiate Athletics to encourage national competition between collegiate men's ten-pin bowling teams.

In 2010, after several decades of absence, men's and women's bowling was elevated to the status of emerging sport by the NAIA after more than 25 institutions declared participation. As part of the process of reaching full championship status, a national invitational tournament was organized as a precursor to a team championship event.

== Results ==
NAIA Men's Bowling Invitational Tournament
Year	Site	Championship match			Tournament MVP
Year	Site	Champion	Match score	Runner-up	Tournament MVP
2011	(Indiana); Indianapolis, IN	Davenport	3–1	William Penn	
2012	(Indiana); Indianapolis, IN	Webber International	3–0	Calumet	Marcello Suartz (Webber International)
2013	(Indiana); Indianapolis, IN	Robert Morris (IL)	3–2	Calumet	Jon Trzcinski (Webber International)
2014	(Illinois); Vernon Hills, IL	Robert Morris (IL) (2)	3–1	Midland	Perry Crowell (Midland)
2015	(Illinois); Arlington Heights, IL	Robert Morris (IL) (3)	3–0	St. Ambrose	
2016	(Indiana); Anderson, IN	Robert Morris (IL) (4)	3–0	Webber International	Andrew Anderson (Webber International)
2017	(Kentucky); Lexington, KY	Webber International (2)	3–1	Pikeville	Matt Russo (Webber International)
2018	(Indiana); Highland, IN	Webber International (3)	3–2	St. Ambrose	Matt Russo (Webber International)
2019	(Kansas); Topeka, KS	SCAD Savannah	3–0	Concordia (MI)	Michael Kicmal (St. Francis (IL))

== Champions ==
Rank	Team	Titles
1	Robert Morris (IL)	4
2	Webber International	3
3	Davenport	1
3	SCAD Savannah	1

== See also ==
- NAIA Men's Bowling Championship
- NAIA Women's Bowling Championship
