= NAIA women's golf championship =

- Sport: Golf
- Founded: 1995
- Country: United States and Canada
- Most recent champion: SCAD Savannah (2)
- Website: NAIA.com

The NAIA women's golf championship is the annual tournament since 1995 to determine the national champions of women's NAIA collegiate golf in the United States and Canada. It has been a 72-hole tournament since 2001.

The most successful programs are Oklahoma City and British Columbia, each with eight NAIA national titles.

SCAD Savannah are the reigning national champions, winning their second national title in 2026.

== Results ==
NAIA women's golf championships
Year	Site	Host course	Team championship				Individual champion	Score
Year	Site	Host course	Champion	Score	Runner-up	Score	Individual champion	Score
1995	Dakota Dunes, SD	Two Rivers Golf Club	Lynn	958	Hardin–Simmons	987	Josefin Stalvant (Lynn)	228
1996	Owasso, OK	Bailey Ranch Golf Club	Lynn	953	Spring Hill	1054	Zoe Grimbeek (Lynn)	230
1997	Delray Beach, FL	Delray Beach Golf Club	Tri-State	970	Mobile	980	Hanna Krehling (Spring Hill)	230
1998	Tulsa, OK	Page Belcher Golf Club	Mobile	971	Southern Nazarene & Southwestern Oklahoma State	979	Kiki Corliss (Findlay)	230
1999	North Palm Beach, FL	North Palm Beach Country Club	Southern Nazarene	965	Texas Lutheran	976	Elizabeth Hoffman (Texas Lutheran)	236
2000	London, KY	London Country Club	Mary Hardin–Baylor	989	British Columbia	998	Denise Thiele (Mary Hardin Baylor)	233
2001	London, KY	London Country Club	British Columbia	1285	Oklahoma City	1359	Katherine Neely (Lipscomb)	308
2002	Palm Coast, FL	Pine Lakes Country Club	Southern Nazarene	1339	Nova Southeastern	1359	Itzel Nieto (Lindenwood)	322
2003	Palm Coast, FL	Pine Lakes Country Club	Northwood (FL)	1263	Oklahoma City	1268	Dana Langdon (Brescia)	303
2004	Daytona Beach, FL	LPGA International	British Columbia	1249	Oklahoma City	1254	Nicole Wildes (Berry)	293
2005	South Bend, IN	Blackthorne Golf Club	Oklahoma City	1226	British Columbia	1275	Emily Albrektson (Oklahoma City)	297
2006	South Bend, IN	Blackthorne Golf Club	Oklahoma City	1215	British Columbia	1249	Ashley Sholer (Oklahoma City)	296
2007	San Marcos, CA	Lake San Marcos Country Club	Oklahoma City	1237	Lindsey Wilson	1255	Krista Burton (Lindsey Wilson)	295
2008	San Marcos, CA	Lake San Marcos Country Club	Oklahoma City	1267	Embry–Riddle	1270	Shanna Page (Bethel (IN))	308
2009	Rapid City, SD	Meadowbrook Golf Club	Oklahoma City	1228	Bethel (IN)	1261	Sydney Cox (Oklahoma City)	297
2010	Rapid City, SD	Meadowbrook Golf Club	British Columbia	1224	Oklahoma City	1231	Nathalie Silva (California Baptist)	301
2011	Greeneville, TN	Link Hills Country Club	California Baptist	1252*	Embry–Riddle	1252	Kylie Barros (British Columbia)	297
2012	Greeneville, TN	Link Hills Country Club	British Columbia	1211	SCAD Savannah	1213	Megan Woodland (Victoria (BC))	292
2013	Lincoln, NE	Wilderness Ridge Golf Club	Oklahoma City	1224	British Columbia	1236	Jessica Schiele (Oklahoma City)	295
2014	Lincoln, NE	Wilderness Ridge Golf Club	Oklahoma City	1209*	SCAD Savannah	1209	Alazne Urizar (SCAD Savannah)	291
2015	Pooler, GA	Savannah Quarters Country Club	Northwood (FL)	1211	Dalton State, SCAD Savannah, & William Woods	1233	Julia McQuilken (Dalton State)	292
2016	Pooler, GA	Savannah Quarters Country Club	Keiser†	599	SCAD Savannah & William Woods	610	Kaitlyn Riley (Cumberlands)	140
2017	Palm Beach Gardens, FL	PGA National	Oklahoma City	925	Embry–Riddle	933	Courtney Dye (Indiana Tech)	222
2018	Palm Beach Gardens, FL	PGA National	SCAD Savannah	909	William Woods	928	Maria Paula Otero (SCAD Savannah)	216
2019	Oklahoma City, OK	Lincoln Park Golf Course	British Columbia	1175	Keiser	1180	Michela Tjan (Keiser)	284
2020	Not held due to the COVID-19 pandemic							
2021	Edmond, OK	Tour 18 at Rose Creek	Keiser	1184	Taylor	1203	Gracie Parrott (Campbellsville)	287
2022	Oklahoma City, OK	Lincoln Park Golf Club	British Columbia	860	Oklahoma City	865	MinJi Kang (Truett McConnell)	204
2023	Silvis, IL	TPC Deere Run	British Columbia	1,199	Keiser†	1,228	MaKayla Tyrell (Oklahoma City)	294
2024	Silvis, IL	TPC Deere Run	Keiser†	1,194	Oklahoma City	1,210	Hoi Ki Lau (Keiser)	289
2025	Ypsilanti, MI	Eagles Crest Golf Course	British Columbia	1,169	Keiser†	1,193	Jessica Ng (British Columbia)	283
2026	Ypsilanti, MI	Eagles Crest Golf Course	SCAD Savannah	919	Dalton State	920	Makena Junkin (Texas Wesleyan)	220

Note:
†Keiser University formerly competed as Northwood University–Florida
* Won in a playoff

== Team titles ==
The following schools have won an NAIA team championship:

Team	NAIA titles	Years won
Oklahoma City	8	2005, 2006, 2007, 2008, 2009, 2013, 2014, 2017
British Columbia	8	2001, 2004, 2010, 2012, 2019, 2022, 2023, 2025
Keiser	5	2003, 2015, 2016, 2021, 2024
Lynn	2	1995, 1996
Southern Nazarene	2	1999, 2002
SCAD Savannah	2	2018, 2026
California Baptist	1	2011
Mary Hardin–Baylor	1	2000
Mobile	1	1998
Trine	1	1997

== Multiple winners ==
=== Individual champion ===
No golfers have won more than one NAIA Championship.

=== Individual champion's school ===
The following schools have produced more than one individual champion:

- 5 champions: Oklahoma City
- 2 champions: Lynn, SCAD Savannah, Keiser, British Columbia

== See also ==
- AIAW intercollegiate women's golf champions
- NAIA men's golf championship
- NCAA women's golf championships (Division I, Division II, Division III)
