= List of Women's Swimming & Diving Academic All-America Team Members of the Year =

Student athlete award

Men's Swimming & Diving Academic All-America Team Members of the Year
- Awarded for: The yearly outstanding women's swimming & diving Academic All-America team member
- Country: United States and Canada
- Presented by: College Sports Communicators

History
- Most recent: Claire Curzan, Virginia; Emily Mears-Bentley, Findlay; Annika Naveen, MIT; Nikki Hahn, SCAD Savannah
- Next ceremony: April 2027
- Website: official site

The Women's Swimming & Diving Academic All-America Team Member of the Year is the annual most outstanding singular swimming & diving athlete of the set of female swimming & diving athletes selected for the Academic All-America Teams in a given year.

== Four-division era (2023–present) ==
Key
†	Indicates winners of the all-sports Academic All-America award.

All winners are American unless indicated otherwise.

Women's Swimming & Diving Academic All-America Team Members of the Year (2023–present)
Year	Division I		Division II		Division III		College/NAIA (Note: College Division, 2011–19; NAIA, 2018–present)	
Year	Winner	School	Winner	School	Winner	School	Winner	School
2023	Lexi Cuomo	Virginia	Paige Mikesell	IUP	Taylor Leone	Emory	(Netherlands) Hanne te Velthuis	Cumberlands
2024	(Singapore) Ching Hwee Ga	Indiana	Benedict Nagy	Colorado Mesa	(Canada) Alex Turvey	Pomona–Pitzer	(Netherlands) Hanne te Velthuis	Milligan
2025	Gretchen Walsh†	Virginia	(Germany) Luna Mertins	Lynn	Abigail Wilkov	Case Western Reserve	Aubrey Bach	Keiser
2026	Claire Curzan	Virginia	(England) Emily Mears-Bentley	Findlay	Annika Naveen	MIT	Nikki Hahn†	SCAD Savannah
