= NAIA lacrosse =

College lacrosse program

Men's lacrosse
- First season: 2016 (invitational sport), 2024 (championship sport)
- No. of teams: 32
- Most recent champion: Keiser Seahawks (2)
- Most titles: Keiser Seahawks (2)
- Website: NAIA.org

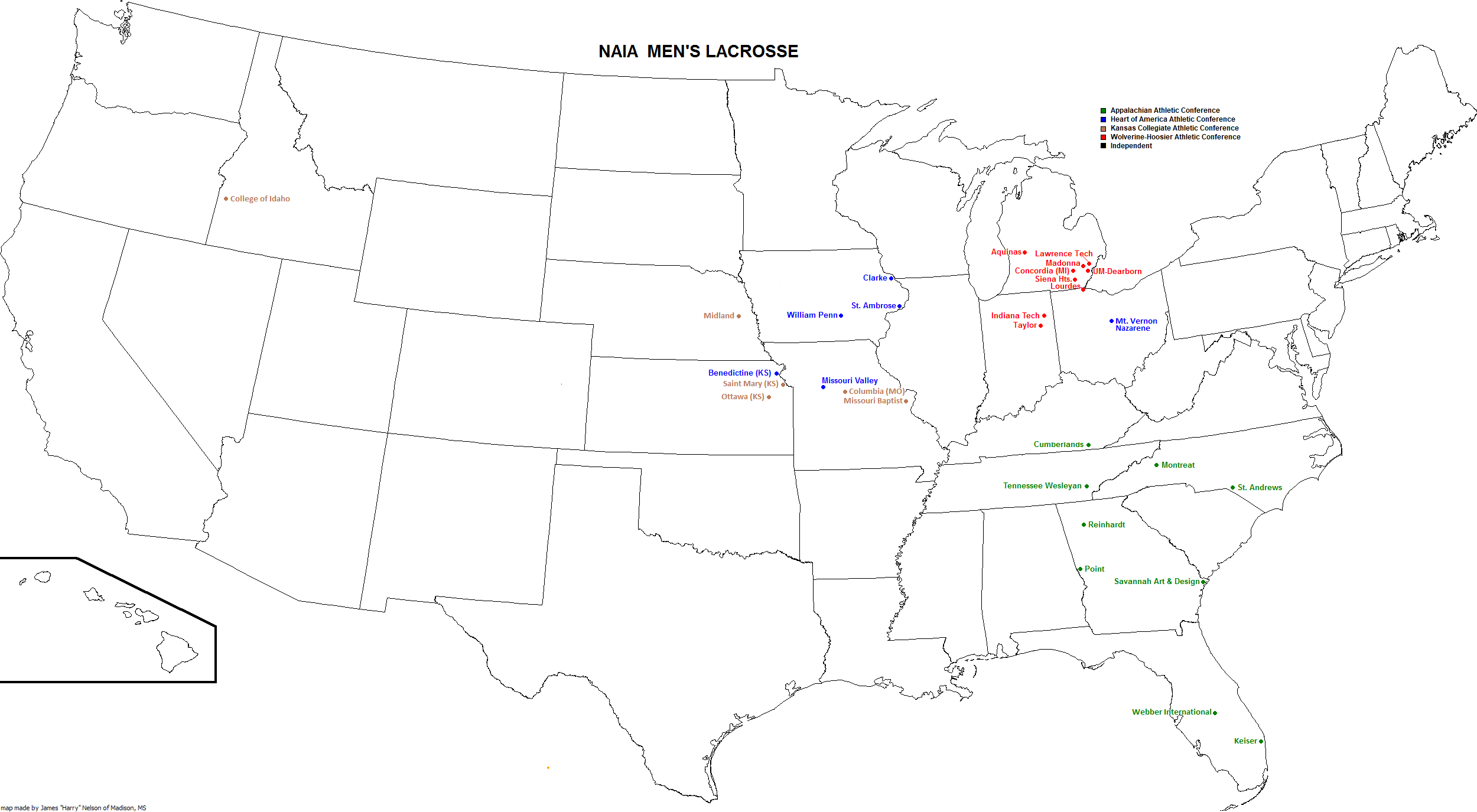
Map of varsity NAIA men's lacrosse teams.

Women's lacrosse
- First season: 2016 (invitational sport), 2021 (championship sport)
- No. of teams: 38
- Most recent champion: Benedictine Ravens (3)
- Most titles: Benedictine Ravens (3)
- Website: NAIA.org

There are numerous men's and women's college lacrosse teams at schools that are members of the National Association of Intercollegiate Athletics (NAIA), which is an alternate varsity athletic organization to the National Collegiate Athletic Association (NCAA).

The Wolverine–Hoosier Athletic Conference (WHAC) was the first NAIA lacrosse conference to offer a championship for both men and women.

During the summer of 2015, the NAIA approved men's and women's lacrosse to move from emerging sport status to national invitational. This move allows NAIA varsity teams to compete within the NAIA rather than an outside organization. The first NAIA National Invitational Tournament (NIT) was held in May 2016 in Greenville, South Carolina. Lacrosse was required to remain an invitational sport for a minimum of two years before applying for full championship status. Women's lacrosse moved to championship status beginning in the 2020–21 season. The inaugural NAIA women's lacrosse championship was held in Savannah, Georgia, in May 2021. Men's lacrosse was also elevated to championship status in 2024–25.

== Men's programs ==
=== Appalachian Athletic Conference ===
| Institution | Nickname | Location | Enrollment |
|---|---|---|---|
| University of the Cumberlands | Patriots | Williamsburg, Kentucky | 1,743 |
| Keiser University | Seahwaks | West Palm Beach, Florida | 19,510 |
| Life University | Running Eagles | Marietta, Georgia | 718 |
| Montreat College | Cavaliers | Montreat, North Carolina | 1,145 |
| Point University | SkyHawks | West Point, Georgia | 1,035 |
| Reinhardt University | Eagles | Waleska, Georgia | 1,057 |
| Savannah College of Art and Design | Bees | Savannah, Georgia | 2,500+ |
| Tennessee Wesleyan University | Bulldogs | Athens, Tennessee | 1,100 |
| Webber International University | Warriors | Babson Park, Florida | 800 |
| Columbia College | Koalas | Columbia, South Carolina | 1,884 |

=== Heart of America Athletic Conference ===
| Institution | Nickname | Location | Enrollment |
|---|---|---|---|
| Benedictine College | Ravens | Atchison, Kansas | 2,200 |
| Clarke University | Pride | Dubuque, Iowa | 1,100 |
| Columbia College | Cougars | Columbia, Missouri | 6,765 |
| Midland University | Warriors | Fremont, Nebraska | 1,395 |
| Missouri Baptist University | Spartans | Creve Coeur, Missouri | 2,800 |
| Missouri Valley College | Vikings | Marshall, Missouri | 1,800 |
| Mount Vernon Nazarene University | Cougars | Mount Vernon, Ohio | 2,222 |
| Ottawa University | Braves | Ottawa, Kansas | 725 |
| St. Ambrose University | Bees | Davenport, Iowa | 3,402 |
| William Penn University | Statesmen | Oskaloosa, Iowa | 1,050 |
| William Woods University | Owls | Fulton, Missouri | 2,300 |

=== Wolverine-Hoosier Athletic Conference ===
| Institution | Nickname | Location | Enrollment |
|---|---|---|---|
| Aquinas College | Saints | Grand Rapids, Michigan | 2,300 |
| Concordia University Ann Arbor | Cardinals | Ann Arbor, Michigan | 1,200 |
| Indiana Institute of Technology | Warriors | Fort Wayne, Indiana | 7,000 |
| Lawrence Technological University | Blue Devils | Southfield, Michigan | 3,000 |
| Madonna University | Crusaders | Livonia, Michigan | 3,139 |
| Siena Heights University | Saints | Adrian, Michigan | 2,307 |
| Taylor University | Trojans | Upland, Indiana | 1,887 |
| University of Michigan–Dearborn | Wolverines | Dearborn, Michigan | 9,500 |

=== Club teams ===
| Institution | Nickname | Location | Enrollment |
|---|---|---|---|
| Arizona Christian University | Firestorm | Glendale, Arizona | 1,001 |
| Biola University | Eagles | La Mirada, California | 3,924 |
| College of Idaho | Coyotes | Caldwell, Idaho | 1,000 |

== Women's programs ==
=== Appalachian Athletic Conference ===
| Institution | Nickname | Location | Enrollment |
|---|---|---|---|
| University of the Cumberlands | Patriots | Williamsburg, Kentucky | 1,743 |
| Georgetown College | Tigers | Georgetown, Kentucky | 1,400 |
| Montreat College | Cavaliers | Montreat, North Carolina | 1,145 |
| Reinhardt University | Eagles | Waleska, Georgia | 1,057 |
| Tennessee Wesleyan University | Bulldogs | Athens, Tennessee | 1,100 |
| Truett McConnell University | Bears | Cleveland, Georgia | 1,000 |
| Columbia College | Koalas | Columbia, South Carolina | 1,884 |

=== Heart of America Athletic Conference ===
| Institution | Nickname | Location | Enrollment |
|---|---|---|---|
| Benedictine College | Ravens | Atchison, Kansas | 2,200 |
| Culver-Stockton College | Wildcats | Canton, Missouri | 1,066 |
| Midland University | Warriors | Fremont, Nebraska | 1,395 |
| Missouri Baptist University | Spartans | St. Louis, Missouri | 2,800 |
| Missouri Valley College | Vikings | Marshall, Missouri | 1,800 |
| Mount Mercy University | Mustangs | Cedar Rapids, Iowa | 1,280 |
| Ottawa University | Braves | Ottawa, Kansas | 725 |
| St. Ambrose University | Fighting Bees | Davenport, Iowa | 3,402 |
| UHSP | Eutectics | St. Louis, Missouri | 698 |

=== Sun Conference ===
| Institution | Nickname | Location | Enrollment |
|---|---|---|---|
| Ave Maria University | Gyrenes | Ave Maria, Florida | 1,080 |
| Keiser University | Seahawks | West Palm Beach, Florida | 19,510 |
| Life University | Running Eagles | Marietta, Georgia | 2,000 |
| New College of Florida | Mighty Banyans | Sarasota, Florida | 669 |
| Savannah College of Art and Design | Bees | Savannah, Georgia | 2,500+ |
| St. Thomas University | Bobcats | Miami Gardens, Florida | 3,650 |
| Warner University | Royals | Lake Wales, Florida | 1,200 |
| Webber International University | Warriors | Babson Park, Florida | 800 |

=== Wolverine–Hoosier Athletic Conference ===
| Institution | Nickname | Location | Enrollment |
|---|---|---|---|
| Aquinas College | Saints | Grand Rapids, Michigan | 2,100 |
| Bethel University | Pilots | Mishawaka, Indiana | 1,964 |
| Indiana Institute of Technology | Warriors | Fort Wayne, Indiana | 3,500 |
| Lawrence Technological University | Blue Devils | Southfield, Michigan | 4,000 |
| Madonna University | Crusaders | Livonia, Michigan | 3,139 |
| Marian University | Knights | Indianapolis, Indiana | 3,595 |
| Rochester Christian University | Warriors | Rochester Hills, Michigan | 1,153 |
| Siena Heights University | Saints | Adrian, Michigan | 2,307 |

=== Independent ===
Departing institutions listed in red

| Institution | Nickname | Location | Enrollment |
|---|---|---|---|
| Eastern Oregon University (Note: On March 10, 2026, EOU announced that it will be discontinuing its lacrosse program after the conclusion of the 2026 season.) | Mountaineers | La Grande, Oregon | 3,488 |

== NAIA National Invitational Tournament (NIT) & National Championship Results ==
=== Men's NIT ===
| Year | Championship Team | Score | Runner-up Team | Arena | Location |
|---|---|---|---|---|---|
| 2016 | Davenport | 13–10 | Missouri Valley | Sirrine Stadium | Greenville, South Carolina |
| 2017 | Reinhardt | 10–5 | Keiser | Sirrine Stadium | Greenville, South Carolina |
| 2018 | Reinhardt | 8–7 ^{OT} | Madonna | Aquinas Athletic Field | Grand Rapids, Michigan |
| 2019 | Reinhardt | 11–4 | Aquinas (MI) | Aquinas Athletic Field | Grand Rapids, Michigan |
| 2020 | Canceled due to the COVID-19 pandemic | | | Memorial Stadium | Savannah, Georgia |
| 2021 | Reinhardt | 17–8 | Indiana Tech | Memorial Stadium | Savannah, Georgia |
| 2022 | Reinhardt | 11–5 | Indiana Tech | Ashton Brosnaham Stadium | Pensacola, Florida |
| 2023 | Keiser | 15–8 | Indiana Tech | Ashton Brosnaham Stadium | Pensacola, Florida |
| 2024 | Keiser | 12–11 | Reinhardt | Memorial Stadium | Savannah, Georgia |

==== List of NIT Champions ====
| School | Championships | Winning years | Runner-up | Runner-up years |
|---|---|---|---|---|
| Reinhardt | 5 | 2017, 2018, 2019, 2021, 2022 | 1 | 2024 |
| Keiser | 2 | 2023, 2024 | 1 | 2017 |
| Davenport | 1 | 2016 | | |
| Indiana Tech | | | 3 | 2021, 2022, 2023 |
| Missouri Valley | | | 1 | 2016 |
| Madonna | | | 1 | 2018 |
| Aquinas (MI) | | | 1 | 2019 |

=== Women's NIT (2016–2019) ===
| Year | Championship Team | Score | Runner-up Team | Arena | Location |
|---|---|---|---|---|---|
| 2016 | Davenport | 13–9 | Georgetown (KY) | Sirrine Stadium | Greenville, South Carolina |
| 2017 | Savannah College of Art and Design | 16–10 | Lawrence Tech | Sirrine Stadium | Greenville, South Carolina |
| 2018 | Savannah College of Art and Design | 18–11 | Indiana Tech | Aquinas Athletic Field | Grand Rapids, Michigan |
| 2019 | Savannah College of Art and Design | 18–12 | Benedictine (KS) | Aquinas Athletic Field | Grand Rapids, Michigan |

==== List of NIT champions ====
| School | Championships | Winning years | Runner-up | Runner-up years |
|---|---|---|---|---|
| Savannah College of Art and Design | 3* | 2017, 2018, 2019 | | |
| Davenport | 1* | 2016 | | |
| Benedictine (KS) | | | 1 | 2019 |
| Lawrence Tech | | | 1 | 2017 |
| Georgetown (KY) | | | 1 | 2016 |
| Indiana Tech | | | 1 | 2018 |

== See also ==
- NCAA men's lacrosse tournaments (Division I, Division II, Division III)
- NCAA women's lacrosse tournaments (Division I, Division II, Division III)
- List of NAIA institutions
- United States Intercollegiate Lacrosse Association
- Wingate Memorial Trophy
- North–South Senior All-Star Game
- Pre-NCAA Lacrosse Champion
