= NAIA women's lacrosse championship =

- Sport: Women's college lacrosse
- Founded: 2020
- No. of teams: 8
- Country: United States
- Most recent champion: Benedictine (3rd)
- Most titles: Benedictine (3)
- Broadcaster: ESPNU
- Website: NCAA.com

The NAIA women's lacrosse tournament is a yearly single-elimination tournament hosted by the National Association of Intercollegiate Athletics to determine the national champion of women's collegiate lacrosse among its members in the United States.

The tournament has been played annually in 2020, although the NAIA hosted a separate NAIA women's lacrosse national invitational tournament from 2016 to 2019 before it elevated women's lacrosse as an official sport.

Benedictine is the defending national champions, winning their third title in 2026.

== Results ==
NAIA women's lacrosse tournament
Year	Site (Host Team)	Championship Results		
Year	Site (Host Team)	Champion	Score	Runner-up
2021; Details	Savannah, GA (SCAD Savannah)	Keiser	13–11	Cumberlands
2022; Details	Southfield, MI (Lawrence Tech)	Benedictine (KS)	9–8	Lawrence Tech
2023; Details	Southfield, MI (Lawrence Tech)	Lawrence Tech	16–15	SCAD Savannah
2024; Details	Savannah, GA (SCAD Savannah)	Reinhardt	18–10	Lawrence Tech
2025; Details	Savannah, GA (SCAD Savannah)	Benedictine (KS)	21–15	Cumberlands
2026; Details	Decatur, AL	Benedictine (KS)	18–10	SCAD Savannah
2027; Details	Decatur, AL			
2028; Details	Decatur, AL			

== Champions ==
=== Active NAIA programs ===
Team	Titles	Years
Benedictine (KS)	3	2022, 2025, 2026
Reinhardt	1	2024
Lawrence Tech	1	2023
Keiser	1	2021

== See also ==
- NCAA women's lacrosse tournaments (Division I, Division II, Division III)
- NAIA lacrosse
