= California Baptist Lancers =

Intercollegiate athletics teams of California Baptist University

- University: California Baptist University
- Nickname: Lancers
- NCAA: Division I
- Conference: Big West (primary); Pac-12 (men's soccer); Mountain Pacific Sports Federation (Stunt)
- Athletic director: Micah Parker
- Location: Riverside, California
- Varsity teams: 16 (6 men's, 10 women's)
- Basketball arena: Fowler Events Center
- Baseball stadium: James W. Totman Stadium
- Softball stadium: John C. Funk Stadium
- Soccer stadium: CBU Soccer Stadium
- Other venues: Lancer Aquatics Center; Van Dyne Gym
- Colors: Navy blue and gold
- Website: cbulancers.com/index.aspx

The California Baptist Lancers are the athletic teams that represent California Baptist University, located in Riverside, California, in intercollegiate sports as a member of the Division I level of the National Collegiate Athletic Association (NCAA), primarily competing in the Western Athletic Conference (WAC). The men's water polo team competes in the West Coast Conference (WCC), the women's water polo team competes in the Golden Coast Conference (GCC), and the men's wrestling team competes in the Big 12 Conference.

In 2026, California Baptist joined the Big West Conference. To do so, the university controversially cut three men's sports: golf, swimming and diving, and wrestling.

== Sports sponsored ==
California Baptist competes in 16 intercollegiate varsity sports: Men's sports include baseball, basketball, cross country, soccer, track (distance), and water polo; while women's sports include basketball, cross country, golf, soccer, softball, stunt, swimming & diving, track (distance), volleyball and water polo; and co-ed sports include cheerleading and dance. In 2017, Cal Baptist announced that women's beach volleyball will be a varsity sport "in the near future", but no specific date for the addition of the sport has been given.

The Lancers also field a team in stunt, which had been part of the NCAA Emerging Sports for Women program before being elevated to full NCAA championship status in January 2026, with the first official NCAA championship taking place in 2026–27. Notably, the stunt program enters the first official NCAA championship season having never lost a competition since the program's first season in 2020–21, with a streak of 140 wins going into 2026–27.

Men's sports	Women's sports
Baseball	Basketball
Basketball	Cross country
Cross country	Golf
Soccer	Soccer
Track^{†}	Softball
Water polo	STUNT
	Swimming and diving
	Track^{†}
	Volleyball
	Water polo
† = outdoor distance running only

== Championships ==
=== Team ===
Sport	Association	Division	Year	Runner-up	Score	References
Softball (1)	NAIA	Single	2009	St. Gregory's	3–2	
Stunt (6)	CSA (Note: College Stunt Association.)	Division I/II	2021	Oklahoma Baptist	19–11	
Stunt (6)	CSA	Division I/II	2022	Oklahoma Baptist	20–5	
Stunt (6)	CSA	Division I/II	2023	Kentucky	24–3	
Stunt (6)	CSA	Division I/II	2024	Kentucky	21–10	
Stunt (6)	CSA	Division I/II	2025	Kentucky	17–13	
Stunt (6)	CSA	Division I/II	2026	Kentucky	27–22	
Men's swimming and diving (4)	NAIA	Single	2006	Lindenwood	752–272	
Men's swimming and diving (4)	NAIA	Single	2007	Lindenwood	937.5–499	
Men's swimming and diving (4)	NAIA	Single	2008	Simon Fraser	573–503	
Men's swimming and diving (4)	NAIA	Single	2009	Fresno Pacific	693–489	
Women's swimming and diving (5)	NAIA	Single	2005	Simon Fraser	551–496	
Women's swimming and diving (5)	NAIA	Single	2006	SCAD Savannah	457–336	
Women's swimming and diving (5)	NAIA	Single	2007	Simon Fraser	783.5–584	
Women's swimming and diving (5)	NAIA	Single	2008	Simon Fraser	729–585	
Women's swimming and diving (5)	NAIA	Single	2011	Fresno Pacific	616–459	
Women's volleyball (2)	NAIA	Single	2004	Concordia Irvine	3–1	
Women's volleyball (2)	NAIA	Single	2005	Columbia (MO)	3–0	

== Athletics facilities ==
Venue	Sport	Opened
Fowler Events Center	Basketball; Volleyball; Wrestling	2017
James W. Totman Stadium	Baseball	2007
John Funk Stadium	Softball	2007
CBU Soccer Stadium	Soccer	2022
Van Dyne Gym	Volleyball; Wrestling	1968
Lancers Aquatic Center	Swimming	1998
Athletics Performance Center	(all CBU sports)	2019
CBU Cheer Gym	Stunt	2013

=== Gallery ===
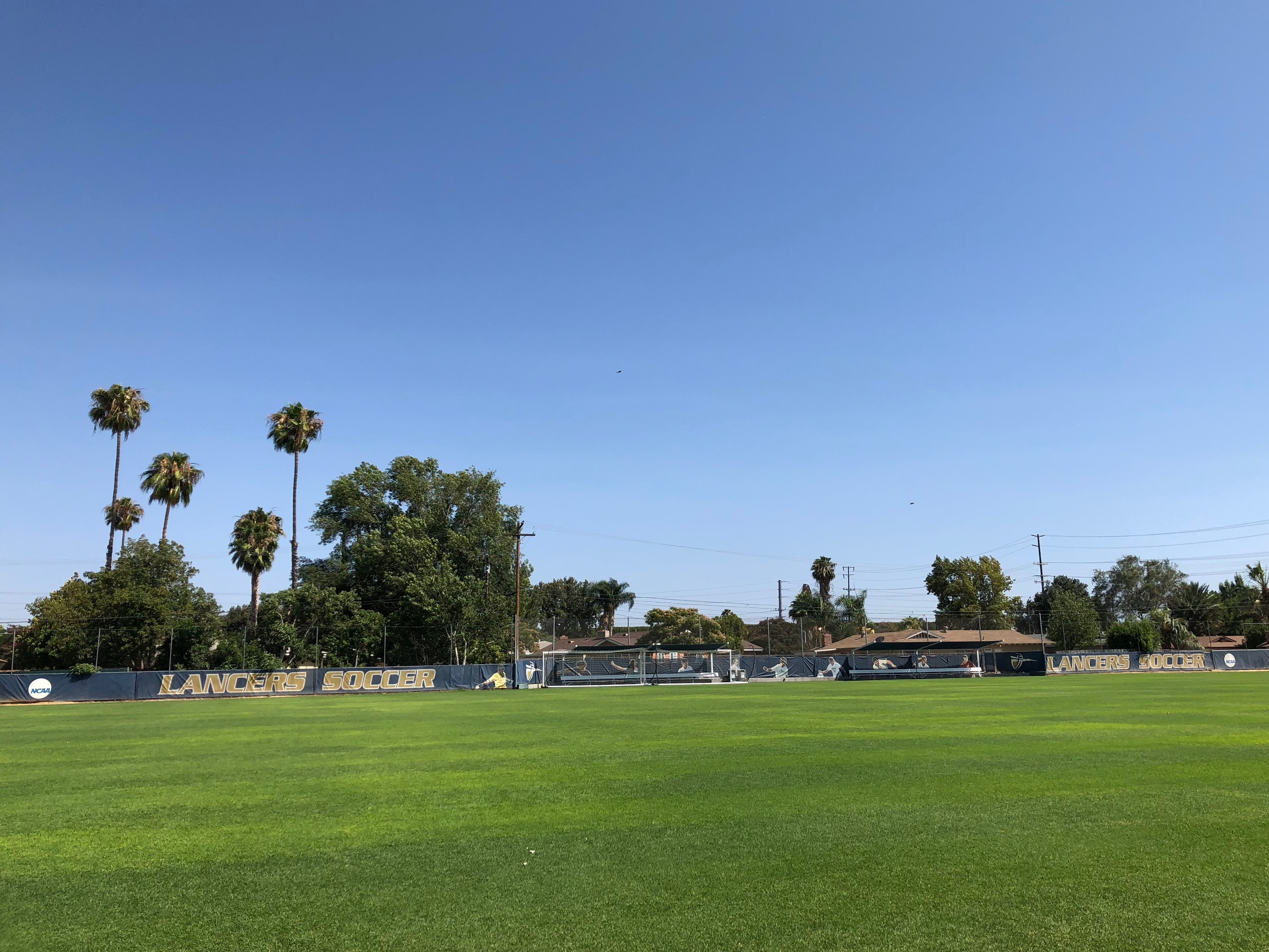
CBU Soccer Stadium

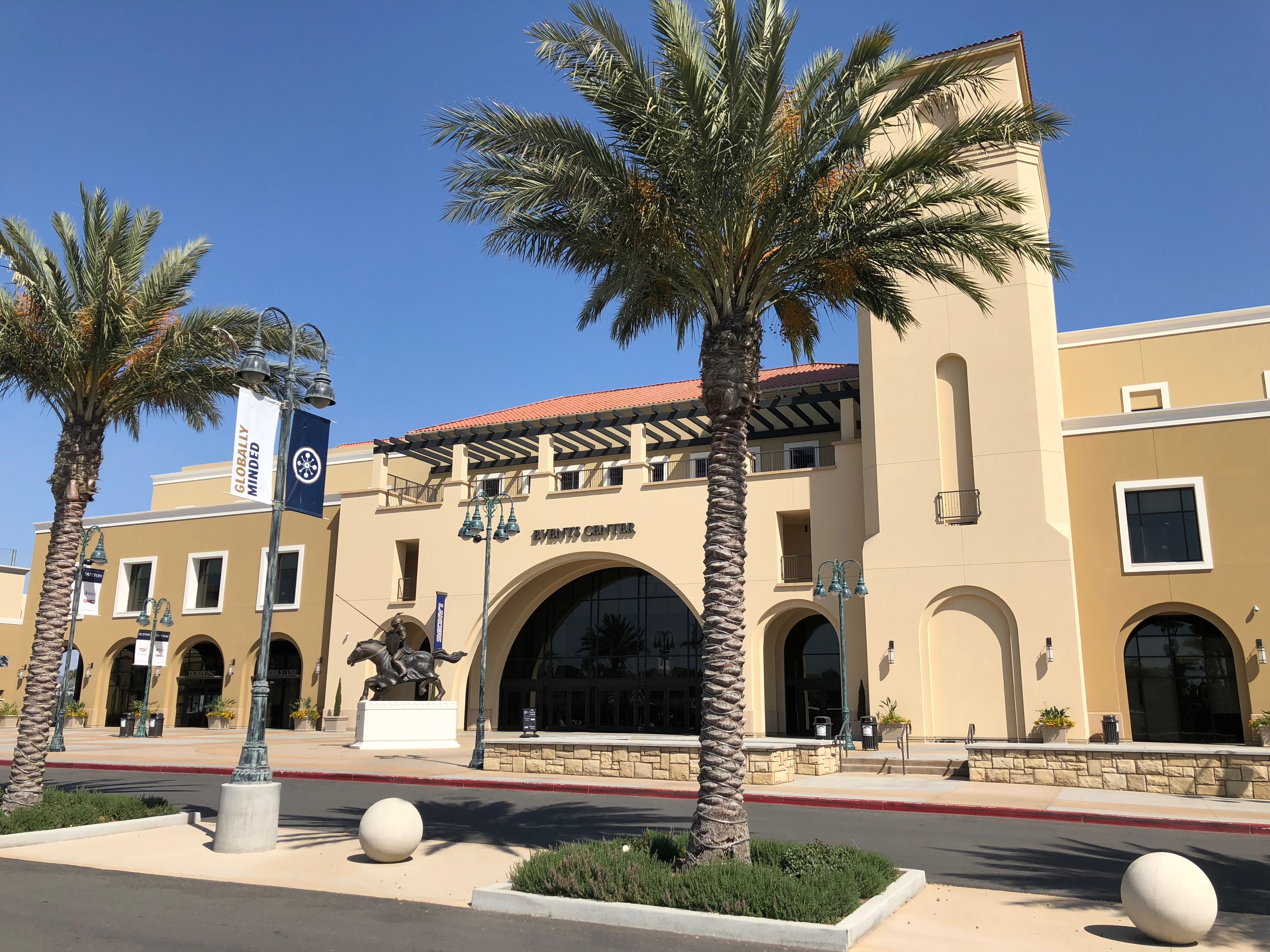
Fowler Events Center

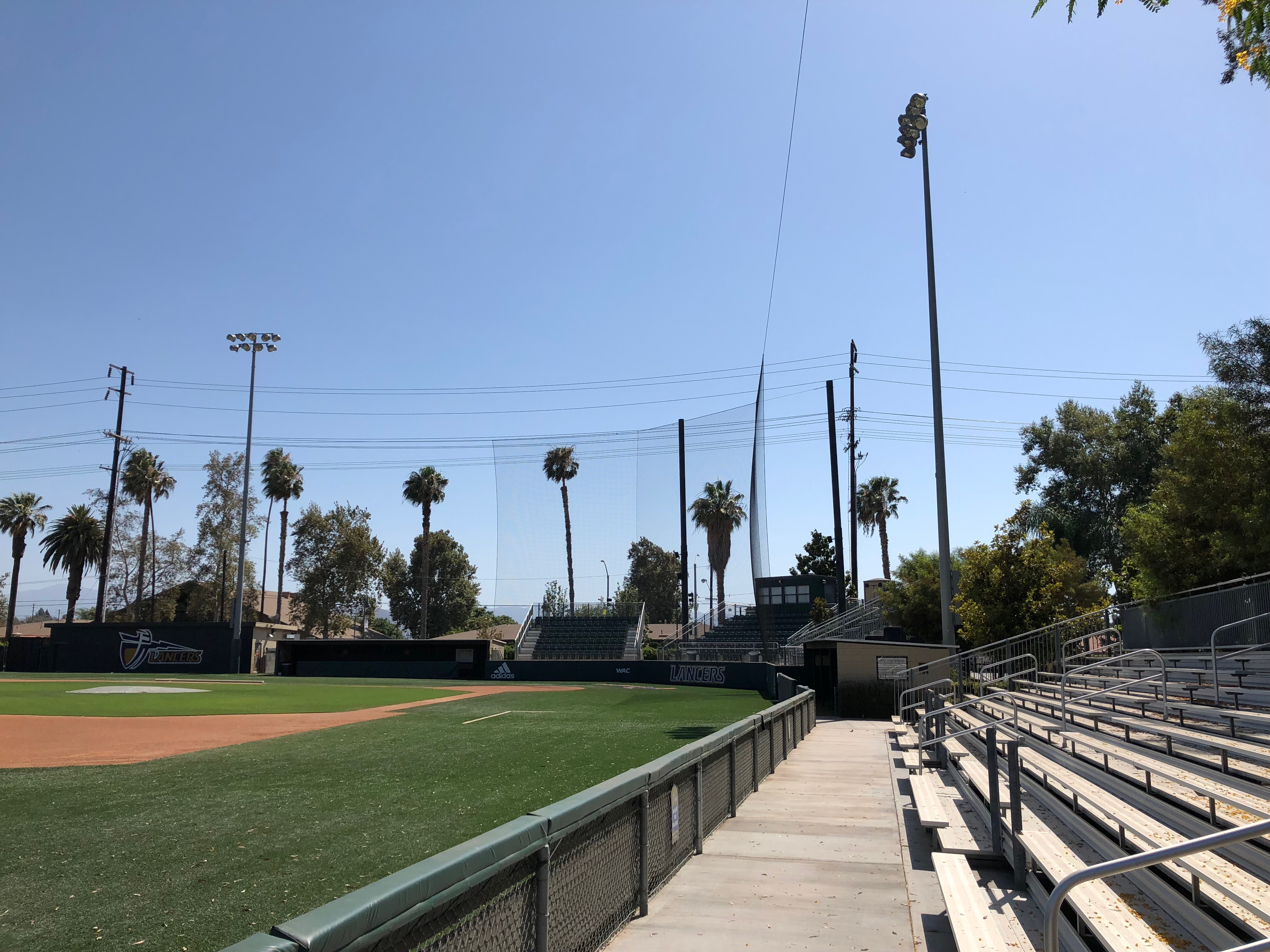
James W. Totman Stadium

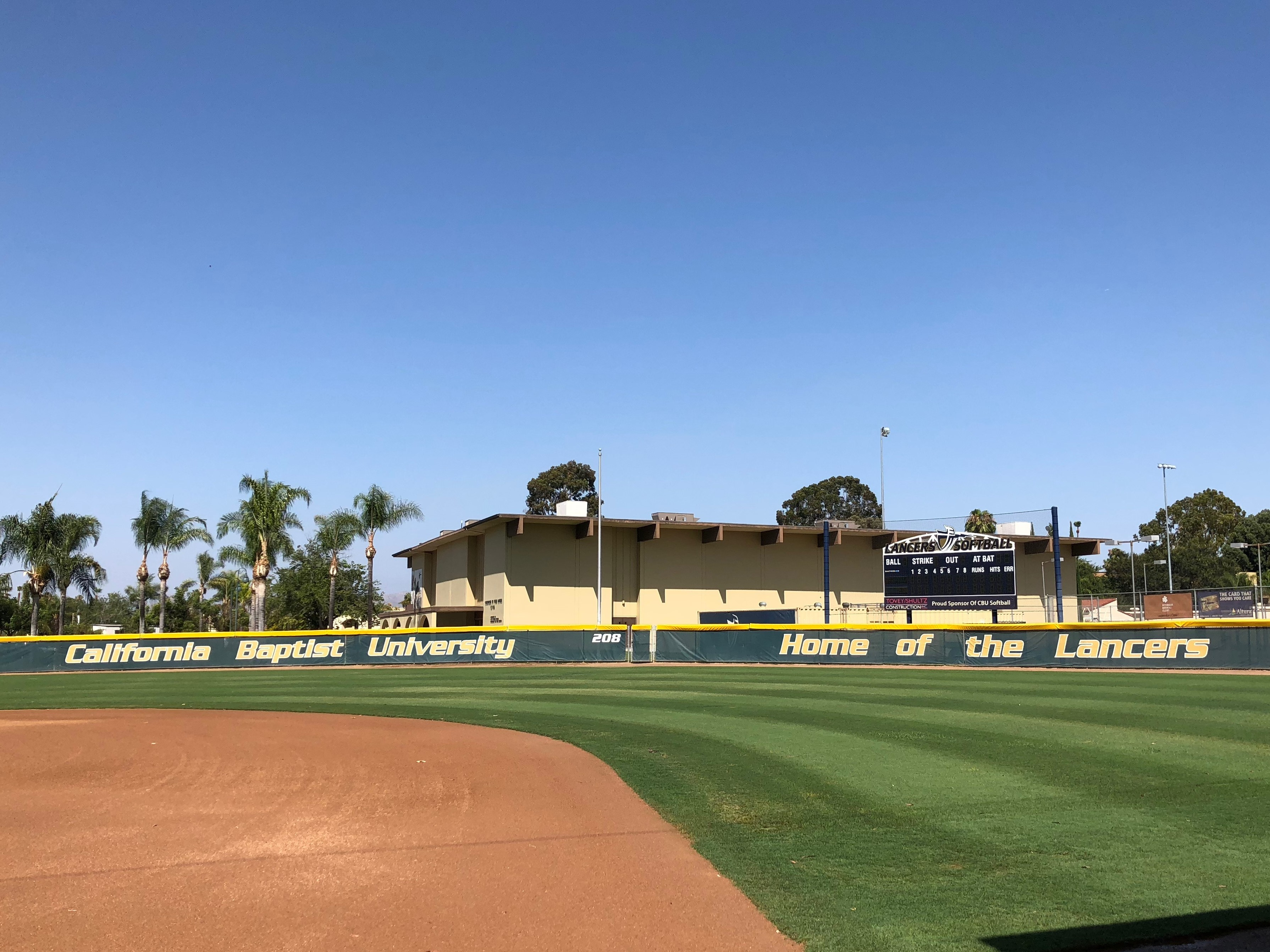
John C, Funk Stadium

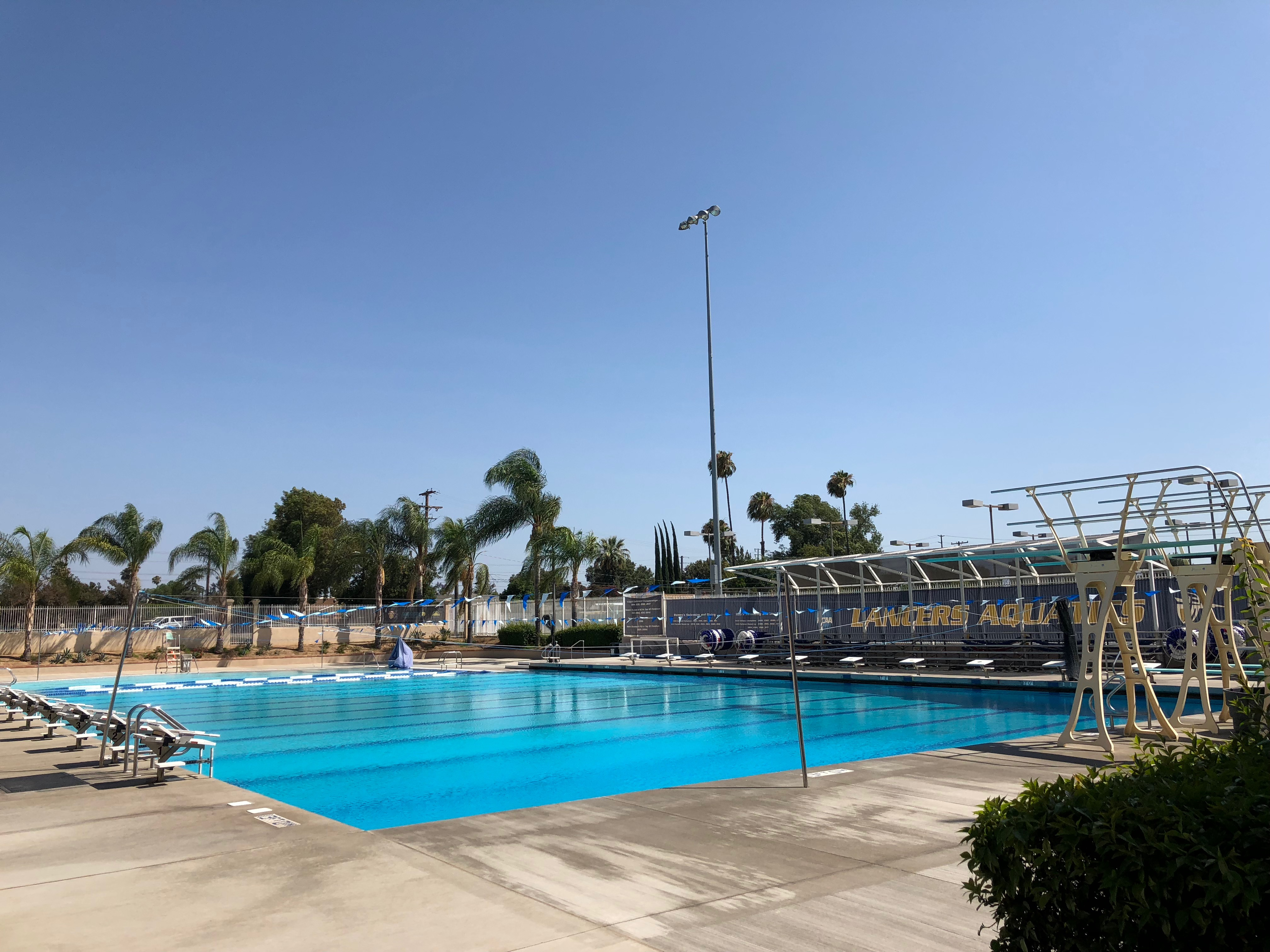
Lancer Aquatics Center

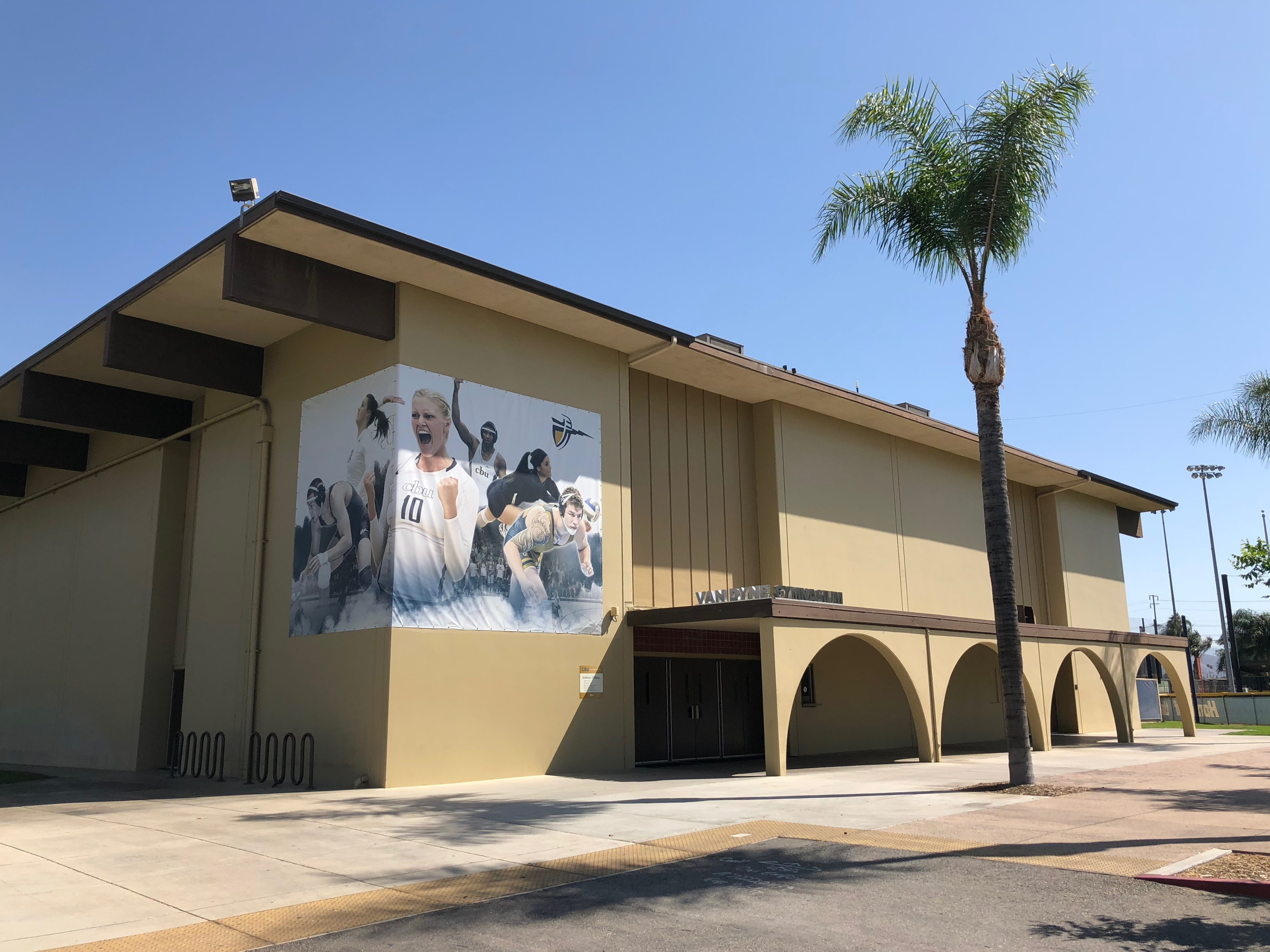
Van Dyne Gym
