= Shea Spencer =

American college quarterback

Wheeling Miners
- Position: Quarterback

Personal information
- Listed height: 6 ft 0 in (1.83 m)
- Listed weight: 180 lb (82 kg)

Career information
- High school: Sebastian River (Vero Beach, Florida)
- College: Keiser (2019–2025)

Career history
- Wheeling Miners (2026–present)

Awards and highlights
- NAIA national champion (2023); First-team All-Sun (2025); Second-team All-Sun (2024)

Shea Spencer is an American professional football quarterback who currently plays for the Wheeling Miners in the Indoor Football League. He previously played for the Kesier Seahawks of Keiser University in the NAIA from 2019–2025.

== Early life ==
Spencer grew up in Vero Beach, Florida, and attended Sebastian River High School, where he played quarterback.

== College career ==
Spencer joined Keiser University in 2019 as part of an early recruiting class for the then-new program. He became the starting quarterback in 2022 and helped establish the Seahawks as an NAIA football power.

He was Keiser's starting quarterback in 2022 but missed the 2023 season due to a knee injury. The team ended up winning the 2023 NAIA championship, defeating Northwestern College (Iowa) 31–21 in the title game. Spencer returned in 2024, starting all 13 games, passing for 3,118 yards and a program-record 30 touchdowns with only six interceptions, earning second-team All-Sun Conference honors. He was named Most Outstanding Offensive Player in multiple playoff games, including a semifinal where he amassed over 400 total yards and five touchdowns.

In 2025, Spencer broke additional records, finishing with 3,391 passing yards (program single-season high) and guiding Keiser to another national title game appearance against Grand View, where he threw for 290 yards in the 22-16 loss. In the semifinals, he accounted for five touchdowns (passing and rushing) in a comeback win over College of Idaho. He earned first-team All-Sun Conference honors in 2025.

Spencer finished his college career as Keiser's all-time leader in career passing yards (9,690) and passing touchdowns (80).

== Professional career ==
On February 27, 2026, Spencer signed with the Wheeling Miners of the Indoor Football League.
