= John Zinda =

American football coach and college athletics administrator

Biographical details
- Born: April 2, 1938; Inglewood, California, U.S.
- Died: July 14, 1995 (aged 57); Los Angeles County, California, U.S.

Coaching career (HC unless noted)
- 1965–1967: Royal Oak HS (CA)
- 1968–1994: Claremont-Mudd

Administrative career (AD unless noted)
- 1983–1995: Claremont-Mudd

Head coaching record
- Overall: 92–141–4 (college)

Accomplishments and honors

Championships
- 4 SCIAC (1970, 1979, 1986–1987)

John David Zinda (April 2, 1938 – July 14, 1995) was an American football coach and college athletics administrator. He served as the head football coach for Claremont-Mudd, the combined athletics program of Claremont McKenna College and Harvey Mudd College in Claremont, California, from 1968 to 1994, compiling a record of 92–141–4. Zinda was the head football coach at Royal Oak High School in Covina, California from 1965 to 1967.

Zinda became director of the Claremont-Mudd combined athletic department in 1983. He died of leukemia on July 14, 1995.

== Head coaching record ==
=== College ===
Year	Team	Overall	Conference	Standing	Bowl/playoffs
Claremont-Mudd Stags (Southern California Intercollegiate Athletic Conference) (1968–1994)
1968	Claremont-Mudd	3–4–2	2–2–1	4th	
1969	Claremont-Mudd	5–4	3–2	3rd	
1970	Claremont-Mudd	8–1	3–1	T–1st	
1971	Claremont-Mudd	7–2	3–2	T–2nd	
1972	Claremont-Mudd	3–6	1–4	T–4th	
1973	Claremont-Mudd	3–5	2–3	T–4th	
1974	Claremont-Mudd	2–6	1–4	T–4th	
1975	Claremont-Mudd	4–4	2–3	T–3rd	
1976	Claremont-Mudd	2–6	2–3	T–4th	
1977	Claremont-Mudd	1–7	1–4	5th	
1978	Claremont-Mudd	6–3	4–1	2nd	
1979	Claremont-Mudd	6–3	4–1	1st	
1980	Claremont-Mudd	6–3	4–1	2nd	
1981	Claremont-Mudd	4–5	4–1	2nd	
1982	Claremont-Mudd	1–8	1–4	5th	
1983	Claremont-Mudd	3–6	2–3	T–3rd	
1984	Claremont-Mudd	3–5–1	1–3–1 (Note: From 1984 to 1990, the Southern California Intercollegiate Athletic Conference (SCIAC) football schedule included multiple head-to-head meetings each season. In 1984 and 1985, each conference member played two other conference members twice. From 1986 to 1990, each conference member played one other conference member twice. A head-to-head sweep of the two games in one season counted as one win for the winner and one loss for the loser in the conference standings. A split of the two games counted as a tie for each team.)	T–4th	
1985	Claremont-Mudd	1–8	0–4–1	6th	
1986	Claremont-Mudd	8–1	4–1	1st	
1987	Claremont-Mudd	5–4	4–0–1	T–1st	
1988	Claremont-Mudd	2–7	1–3–1	5th	
1989	Claremont-Mudd	3–6	1–4	5th	
1990	Claremont-Mudd	2–7	1–3–1	5th	
1991	Claremont-Mudd	0–9	0–5	6th	
1992	Claremont-Mudd	0–9	0–6	7th	
1993	Claremont-Mudd	1–6–1	1–5	6th	
1994	Claremont-Mudd	3–6	2–4	5th	
Claremont-Mudd:		92–141–4	54–77–6		
Total:		92–141–4			
National championship Conference title Conference division title or championship game berth
