= Fresno Pacific Sunbirds =

- University: Fresno Pacific University
- Conference: PacWest (primary); WWPA (water polo)
- NCAA: Division II
- Athletic director: Kyle Ferguson
- Location: Fresno, California
- Varsity teams: 17 (8 men's, 9 women's)
- Basketball arena: Special Events Center
- Baseball stadium: Dan Martin Stadium
- Mascot: Sunny the Sunbird
- Nickname: Sunbirds
- Colors: Navy blue and orange
- Website: www.fpusunbirds.com
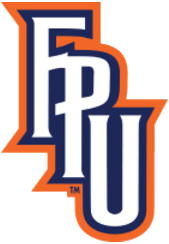

The Fresno Pacific Sunbirds (also FPU Sunbirds) are the athletic teams that represent Fresno Pacific University, located in Fresno, California, in NCAA Division II intercollegiate sports as a member of the Division II level of the National Collegiate Athletic Association (NCAA), primarily competing in the Pacific West Conference (PacWest) for most of its sports since the 2012–13 academic year. while its men's and women's water polo teams compete in the Western Water Polo Association (WWPA). The Sunbirds previously competed in the Golden State Athletic Conference (GSAC) of the National Association of Intercollegiate Athletics (NAIA) from 1986–87 to 2011–12.

== History ==
=== NAIA ===
During their days in the NAIA, the Sunbirds boasted one of the top programs, finishing in the top five of the NACDA Directors' Cup in each of their last five seasons as a member (2007–2012). FPU has won a total of 58 conference titles and 13 national titles. Within the last five years, FPU has won national titles in Volleyball, Men's Swimming & Diving, Women's Swimming & Diving, Men's Tennis and Women's Tennis. They've also taken home conference titles in Men's Basketball, Men's Soccer and Men's Track & Field, and garnered national attention in Men's Water Polo, Women's Soccer, Baseball and Women's Track and Field. The university has hosted a number of NAIA special events, including the Track & Field National Championships, Men's Soccer Nationals and a round of the NAIA World Series.

=== NCAA ===
On June 1, 2011, the university announced that it had accepted an invitation to join the Pacific West Conference in NCAA Division II competition, joining fellow Golden State Athletic Conference (GSAC) members Azusa Pacific University and Point Loma Nazarene University, and California Pacific Conference (CalPac) member Holy Names University as part of the conference's expansion from 10–14 members. While the majority of sports will compete in the PacWest, water polo will join the Western Water Polo Association (WWPA). The Sunbirds will compete in conference play beginning in the 2012–2013 academic year. They will be eligible for conference championships and awards immediately but ineligible for NCAA postseason play for the first two seasons during the transition process.

On July 11, 2011, Fresno Pacific along with fellow conference mates, Azusa Pacific and Point Loma Nazarene, learned that their application for NCAA membership had been approved. The 2011–2012 athletic season marked the final one in GSAC and NAIA competition for the Sunbirds. The 2012–2013 season marked the beginning of Pacific West Conference play for FPU. The Sunbirds experienced immediate success, finishing second in the 14-team league in men's soccer, women's volleyball, men's basketball and men's tennis. The women's volleyball team cracked the NCAA Division II top 10, the only transitioning school to do so in any sport.

On January 13, 2014, Fresno Pacific named Leslie Schuemann its director of athletics. Schuemann was the former director of academic and membership affairs at the NCAA and was instrumental in the formation of the NCAA Division II membership process.

On June 12, 2025, Fresno Pacific announced they would depart the Pacific West Conference on July 1, 2026 and join the California Collegiate Athletic Association.

== Varsity teams ==
Fresno Pacific competes in 17 intercollegiate varsity sports: Men's sports include baseball, basketball, cross country, soccer, swimming, tennis, track & field and water polo; while women's sports include basketball, cheerleading, cross country, soccer, swimming, tennis, track & field, volleyball and water polo.

== National championships ==
=== Team ===
Sport	Association	Division	Year	Runner-up	Score
Men's swimming and diving (2)	NAIA	Single	2010	California Baptist	659.5–488.5
Men's swimming and diving (2)	NAIA	Single	2011	California Baptist	698.5–582
Women's swimming and diving (1)	NAIA	Single	2012	Oklahoma Baptist	780–578
Men's tennis (2)	NAIA	Single	2009	Auburn Montgomery	5–3
Men's tennis (2)	NAIA	Single	2011	Embry–Riddle	5–1
Women's tennis (1)	NAIA	Single	2010	Auburn Montgomery	5–2
Women's volleyball (6)	NAIA	Single	1989	Hawaii Pacific	2–0
Women's volleyball (6)	NAIA	Single	2003	Columbia (MO)	3–1
Women's volleyball (6)	NAIA	Single	2007	California Baptist	3–1
Women's volleyball (6)	NAIA	Single	2008	Concordia Irvine	3–2
Women's volleyball (6)	NAIA	Single	2009	Georgetown (KY)	3–0
Women's volleyball (6)	NAIA	Single	2010	Columbia (MO)	3–0

== Individual programs ==
=== Women's volleyball ===
The Women’s Volleyball program was dominant at the NAIA level, winning a national title in 1989, and four consecutive national titles from 2007–2010 including an undefeated 38–0 season in 2009. FPU won the 2010 title without dropping a single set in the entire national tournament. The Sunbirds have consistently defeated crosstown institution NCAA Division I rival Fresno State of the Mountain West Conference, with a 7–1 all-time record against the Bulldogs.

=== Men's tennis ===
The Men's Tennis program dominated their last five seasons as a member of the NAIA's Golden State Athletic Conference, winning the league title in each season (2009–2014). In the same stretch, FPU played for five straight NAIA Men's Tennis Championships with victories in 2009 and 2011 before joining the NCAA prior to the 2012–13 academic year. In 2020, FPU announced the return of men's tennis program as part of the school's NCAA D2 athletics.

== Olympic trials & professional athletes ==
Fresno Pacific has a reputation for turning out an extraordinary number of professional athletes for a school of its size. FPU currently has close to 50 alumni playing professionally in numerous sports, with the highest number coming from women's volleyball, men's soccer, men's basketball and baseball.

FPU had four alumni competing between the 2012 United States Olympic Swimming Trials and the United States Olympic Track & Field Trials. Robert Griswold competed for the men's swimming team. Women's swimmer Cheyenne Coffman finished 10th in the nation in the 100 backstroke, narrowly finishing behind Missy Franklin and Natalie Coughlin while triple jumper Ethan DeJongh placed 15th in the USA in the triple jump. FPU has a number of hopefuls for the 2016 Olympics from multiple countries, including Fiji national record holders Milika Tuivanuavou (triple jump, shot put) and Eugene Vollmer (triple jump).

Since 2006, FPU has had seven players selected in the Major League Baseball draft. In 2011, Chris Schwinden became the first former Sunbird to reach the major leagues, debuting with the New York Mets. That same year, the FPU baseball program beat out Fresno State and Fresno City College to have the first local college player selected in the MLB draft when pitcher Jesse Darrah went in the 8th round to the Arizona Diamondbacks.

FPU has had four alumni go on to reach Major League Soccer, as well as numerous others who have gone on to play professionally in the United States and around the world. Former Sunbird Pablo Campos went on to win the MLS Cup with Real Salt Lake and is currently a star forward for the Minnesota United FC of the North American Soccer League. In 2013, FPU alum Paul Islas became the first NCAA Division II player selected in the MLS Draft when he was selected in the first round of the supplemental portion by Chivas USA.

The FPU men's basketball program has continuously put out professional athletes both overseas and in the United States. In 2010, alum James Lewis became the first FPU player to be selected in the NBA Development League draft, being selected by the Maine Red Claws. He was selected in 2011 as well by the Austin Toros. In 2013, FPU guard John Taylor led NCAA Division II in scoring at 27.5 points per game and declared for the NBA draft.

FPU has had a number of alumni achieve a professional world tennis ranking in either the WTA or the ATP. Including, the ITA National Small College champion Jelena Pandžić.

== Mascot ==
The athletics mascot is Sunny the Sunbird.
