= Oklahoma Baptist Bison =

- University: Oklahoma Baptist University
- Nickname: Bison
- NCAA: Division II
- Conference: Great American (primary)
- Athletic director: Robert Davenport
- Location: Shawnee, Oklahoma
- Varsity teams: 13
- Football stadium: Crain Family Stadium
- Basketball arena: Noble Complex
- Baseball stadium: Bobby Cox Field at Bison Park
- Softball stadium: Bison Field
- Colors: Green and gold
- Website: obubison.com

The Oklahoma Baptist Bison are the athletic teams that represent Oklahoma Baptist University, located in Shawnee, Oklahoma, in intercollegiate athletics as a member of the NCAA Division II ranks, primarily competing in the Great American Conference (GAC) since the 2015–16 academic year. They were also a member of the National Christian College Athletic Association (NCCAA), primarily competing as an independent in the Central Region of the Division I level.

Prior joining the NCAA, the Bison previously competed in the National Association of Intercollegiate Athletics (NAIA), primarily competing in the Sooner Athletic Conference (SAC) from 1978–79 to 2014–15; and in the Texoma Athletic Conference from 1973–74 to 1977–78.

== Varsity teams ==
OBU competes in 13 intercollegiate varsity sports: Men's sports include baseball, basketball, cross country, football and track and field; while women's sports include basketball, cross country, golf, soccer, softball, stunt, track & field and volleyball. Former sports included men's golf, women's lacrosse, men's soccer, men's & women's swimming, men's & women's tennis and women's cheerleading.

Men's sports	Women's sports
Baseball	Basketball
Basketball	Cross Country
Cross Country	Golf
Football	Soccer
Track & Field	Softball
	Stunt
	Track and Field
	Volleyball

=== Move to NCAA Division II ===
As of July 11, 2014, the NCAA Division II Membership Committee recommended the membership application for the institution to set up the move from the NAIA to NCAA Division II, competing in the Great American Conference, effectively the 2015–16 season.

== National championships ==
=== Team ===
Sport	Association	Division	Year	Opponent/Runner-up	Score
Men's basketball (2)	NAIA	Single	1966	Georgia Southern	88–59
Men's basketball (2)	NAIA	Division I	2010	Azusa Pacific	84–83
Men's swimming and diving (4)	NAIA	Single	2012	Fresno Pacific	757–752
Men's swimming and diving (4)	NAIA	Single	2013	Concordia Irvine	881–448.5
Men's swimming and diving (4)	NAIA	Single	2014	Olivet Nazarene	900–485
Men's swimming and diving (4)	NAIA	Single	2015	Olivet Nazarene	798.5–575.5
Women's swimming and diving (3)	NAIA	Single	2013	SCAD Savannah	845–600
Women's swimming and diving (3)	NAIA	Single	2014	SCAD Savannah	849–492
Women's swimming and diving (3)	NAIA	Single	2015	SCAD Savannah	745–481
Men's indoor track and field (1)	NAIA	Single	2013	Wayland Baptist	86.5–70
Women's indoor track and field (7)	NAIA	Single	2005	McKendree	86.5–72
Women's indoor track and field (7)	NAIA	Single	2007	Wayland Baptist	52.33–51
Women's indoor track and field (7)	NAIA	Single	2010	Wayland Baptist	68–67
Women's indoor track and field (7)	NAIA	Single	2011	Simon Fraser	58–75
Women's indoor track and field (7)	NAIA	Single	2013	Indiana Tech	113–87
Women's indoor track and field (7)	NAIA	Single	2014	Indiana Tech	133–123
Women's indoor track and field (7)	NAIA	Single	2015	Indiana Tech	87–79
Men's outdoor track and field (2)	NAIA	Single	1990	Azusa Pacific	57–53 (+4)
Men's outdoor track and field (2)	NAIA	Single	2007	Dickinson State	77–58 (+19)
Women's outdoor track and field (1)	NAIA	Single	2012	Concordia Oregon	101.5–81 (+20.5)

== Individual programs ==
=== Baseball ===
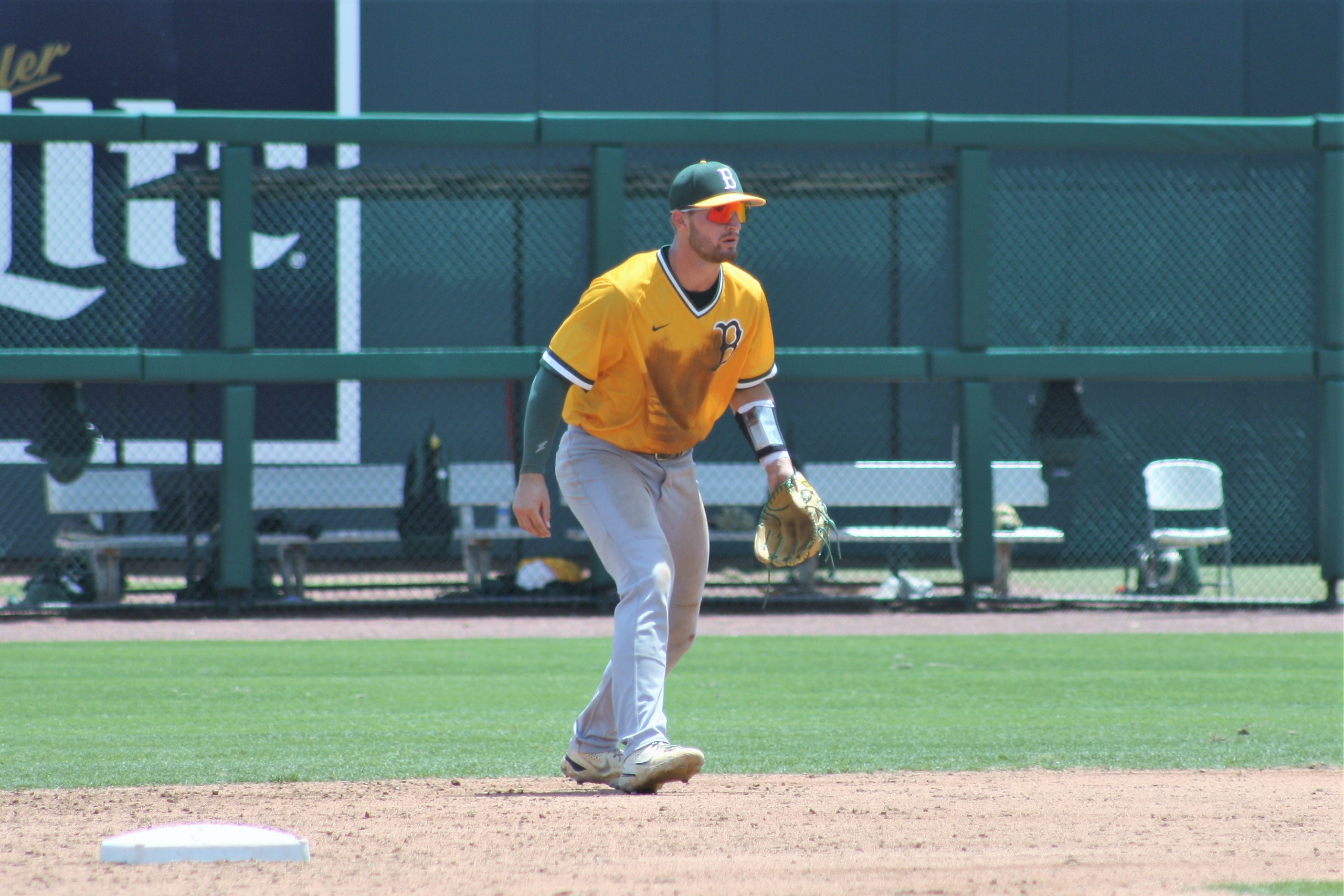
Brandon Brewer plays second base for the Oklahoma Baptist Bison

Oklahoma Baptist has had 15 Major League Baseball draft selections since the draft began in 1965.

Year	Player	Round	Team
1966	Charlie Stewart	8	Cardinals
1984	James King	36	Mariners
1989	Jose Olmeda	23	Braves
1989	William Hocking	22	Giants
1991	Darin Haddock	42	Rangers
1994	Pat Evans	21	Indians
1997	Dustin Robinson	12	Reds
1999	Wes Faust	46	Giants
2005	Felix Peguero	28	Royals
2009	Spencer Hylander	50	Astros
2011	Richie Mirowski	45	Nationals
2011	Kyle Brule	32	Padres
2014	Osvaldo Vela	21	Dodgers
2014	Matthew Page	10	Nationals
2014	Julian Merryweather	5	Indians

=== Swimming ===
OBU has won NAIA championships in men's swimming and diving (2012 and 2013) and women's swimming and diving (2013).

On March 9, 2012, swim team member Ivan Maciuniak, age 22, drowned in the pool. A native of Las Palmas, Canary Islands, Spain, Maciuniak had joined his brother, Mateo, at OBU in January 2012. The Maciuniak brothers were on the four-man 400-meter relay team which won the final event of the meet to claim the national championship in OBU's first year of intercollegiate swimming.
