= NAIA men's swimming and diving championships =

Annual college aquatic tournament

NAIA Men's Swimming and Diving Championships
- Founded: 1957
- Region: United States
- Current champions: Keiser (FL) (7th)
- Most championships: Simon Fraser (17)
- Website: NAIA.com

The NAIA Men's Swimming and Diving Championships comprise the annual swim meet held to determine the national champions of men's NAIA collegiate swimming and diving in the United States and Canada. It has been held each year since 1957.

The most successful program has been Simon Fraser, with 17 NAIA national titles.

Keiser (FL) are the reigning national champions, winning their seventh national title in 2026.

== Results ==
NAIA Men's Swimming and Diving Championships
Year	Site	Championship Results			
Year	Site	Winner	Points	Runners-up	Points
1957; Details	Carbondale, IL	East Carolina	54	Southern Illinois	50
1958; Details	Muncie, IN	North Central (IL)	88	Central Michigan	54½
1959; Details	Muncie, IN	East Carolina (2)	71	North Central (IL)	68
1960; Details	Muncie, IN	Southern Illinois	150½	North Central (IL)	87½
1961; Details	Detroit, MI	North Central (IL) (2)	111	Detroit Tech	78
1962; Details	Detroit, MI	North Central (IL) (3)	124	Detroit Tech	75
1963; Details	Bartlesville, OK	North Central (IL) (4)	101	Macalester	65
1964; Details	St. Paul, MN	Macalester	94	Eastern New Mexico	90
1965; Details	La Crosse, WI	Macalester (2)	71	Eastern New Mexico	55
1966; Details	Conway, AR	Macalester (3)	250½	Eastern New Mexico	188
1967; Details	Buffalo, NY	Claremont–Mudd	185	Bemidji State; Macalester	168
1968; Details	St. Cloud, MN	Eastern Michigan	326	Claremont–Mudd	279
1969; Details	Downers Grove, IL	Eastern Michigan (2)	312	Claremont–Mudd	252
1970; Details	La Crosse, WI	Eastern Michigan (3)	339	Claremont–Mudd	316
1971; Details	Clarion, PA	Eastern Michigan (4)	325	Simon Faser	223
1972; Details	Marshall, MN	Simon Fraser	332	Claremont–Mudd	217
1973; Details	Pittsburg, KS	Simon Fraser (2)	378	West Liberty State	277
1974; Details	Downers Grove, IL	Simon Fraser (3)	434	Occidental	218
1975; Details	Marshall, MN	Simon Fraser (4)	515	Central Washington	191
1976; Details	Marshall, MN	Simon Fraser (5)	419	Central Washington	201
1977; Details	Marshall, MN	Simon Fraser (6)	424	Central Washington	249
1978; Details	Portland, OR	Simon Fraser (7)	461	Wisconsin–Eau Claire	214
1979; Details	Huntsville, AL	Simon Fraser (8)	449	Wisconsin–Eau Claire	271
1980; Details	Whitewater, WI	Simon Fraser (9)	422	Drury	382
1981; Details	Liberty, MO	Drury	483	Denver; Simon Fraser	304
1982; Details	Burnaby, BC	Drury (2)	456	Denver	301
1983; Details	Arkadelphia, AR	Simon Fraser (10)	408	Drury	342
1984; Details	Arkadelphia, AR	Central Washington	292	Drury	285
1985; Details	Indianapolis, IN	Drury (3)	368	Central Washington	350
1986; Details	Spokane, WA	Central Washington (2)	381	Drury	335
1987; Details	Milwaukee, WI	Central Washington (3)	443	Drury	404
1988; Details	Orlando, FL	Drury (4)	494	Wisconsin–Eau Claire	329½
1989; Details	Brown Deer, WI	Drury (5)	632½	Puget Sound	410½
1990; Details	Canton, OH	Drury (6)	634	Wisconsin–Stevens Point	376
1991; Details	Federal Way, WA	Drury (7)	631½	Oral Roberts	630
1992; Details	Canton, OH	Drury (8)	779½	Simon Fraser	493
1993; Details	San Antonio, TX	Drury (9)	602½	Puget Sound	487
1994; Details	Federal Way, WA	Drury (10)	813½	Puget Sound	507
1995; Details	San Antonio, TX	Puget Sound	607	Simon Fraser	575
1996; Details	San Antonio, TX	Puget Sound (2)	602½	Whitworth	401½
1997; Details	Federal Way, WA	Puget Sound (3)	572	Simon Fraser	460
1998; Details	Federal Way, WA	Simon Fraser (11)	545	Puget Sound	516
1999; Details	Federal Way, WA	Simon Fraser (12)	795	Puget Sound	508½
2000; Details	Burnaby, BC	Simon Fraser (13)	605½	California Baptist	346½
2001; Details	Burnaby, BC	Simon Fraser (14)	548½	California Baptist	537
2002; Details	Burnaby, BC	Seattle	487	California Baptist	444
2003; Details	Lawrence, KS	Simon Fraser (15)	575	California Baptist	542
2004; Details	Lawrence, KS	Simon Fraser (16)	562	California Baptist	487
2005; Details	St. Peters, MO	Simon Fraser (17)	639	California Baptist	580
2006; Details	St. Peters, MO	California Baptist	752	Lindenwood	272
2007; Details	San Antonio, TX	California Baptist (2)	937½	Lindenwood	499
2008; Details	San Antonio, TX	California Baptist (3)	573	Simon Fraser	503
2009; Details	St. Peters, MO	California Baptist (4)	693	Fresno Pacific	489
2010; Details	St. Peters, MO	Fresno Pacific	659½	California Baptist	488½
2011; Details	St. Peters, MO	Fresno Pacific (2)	698½	California Baptist	582
2012; Details	Oklahoma City, OK	Oklahoma Baptist	757	Fresno Pacific	752
2013; Details	Oklahoma City, OK	Oklahoma Baptist (2)	881	Concordia (CA)	448½
2014; Details	Oklahoma City, OK	Oklahoma Baptist (3)	900	Olivet Nazarene	485
2015; Details	Oklahoma City, OK	Oklahoma Baptist (4)	798½	Olivet Nazarene	575½
2016; Details	Columbus, GA	Olivet Nazarene	714½	SCAD Savannah	600
2017; Details	Columbus, GA	Olivet Nazarene (2)	658½	SCAD Savannah	443
2018; Details	Columbus, GA	Keiser (FL)	653½	SCAD Savannah	485½
2019; Details	Columbus, GA	Keiser (FL) (2)	622	SCAD Savannah	599½
2020; Details	Knoxville, TN	Keiser (FL) (3)	743	SCAD Savannah	681
2021	Cancelled due to the COVID-19 pandemic				
2022; Details	Columbus, GA	Keiser (FL) (4)	785	SCAD Savannah	427
2023; Details	Columbus, GA	Keiser (FL) (5)	719	St. Thomas (FL)	569
2024; Details	Columbus, GA	St. Thomas (FL)	640.5	Keiser	624.5
2025; Details	Elkhart, IN	Keiser (FL) (6)	731	SCAD Savannah	352
2026; Details	Elkhart, IN	Keiser (FL) (7)	675	Cumberlands (KY)	397

== Champions ==
Team national championships among active programs: 7, 2, 1

=== Active NAIA programs ===
Team	Titles	Years
Keiser	7	2018, 2019, 2020, 2022, 2023, 2025, 2026
Olivet Nazarene	2	2016, 2017
St. Thomas (FL)	1	2024

=== Former NAIA programs ===
Team	Titles	Years
Simon Fraser	17	1972, 1973, 1974, 1975, 1976, 1977, 1978, 1979, 1980, 1983, 1998, 1999, 2000, 2001, 2003, 2004, 2005
Drury	10	1981, 1982, 1985, 1988, 1989, 1990, 1991, 1992, 1993, 1994
Oklahoma Baptist	4	2012, 2013, 2014, 2015
California Baptist	4	2006, 2007, 2008, 2009
Eastern Michigan	4	1968, 1969, 1970, 1971
North Central (IL)	4	1958, 1961, 1962, 1963
Puget Sound	3	1995, 1996, 1997
Central Washington	3	1984, 1986, 1987
Macalester	3	1964, 1965, 1966
Fresno Pacific	2	2010, 2011
East Carolina	2	1957, 1959
Seattle	1	2002
Claremont-Mudd-Scripps	1	1967
Southern Illinois	1	1960

== Records ==
=== Yards ===
Event	Time	Swimmer	School	Date	Ref
50 freestyle	19.30	Levente Mozsárik	SCAD	5 March 2026	
100 freestyle	42.53	Daniel Ramirez	Oklahoma Baptist University	2014	
200 freestyle	1:34.89	Joel Ax	SCAD	2016	
500 freestyle	4:20.35	Joel Thatcher	SCAD	2017	
1650 freestyle	15:13.49	Aaron Wilmes	Keiser Seahawks	4 December 2022	
50 backstroke	21.30	Isaiah Aleksenko	Keiser	5 March 2025	
100 backstroke	46.12	Isaiah Aleksenko	Keiser	7 March 2025	
200 backstroke	1:44.62	Mate Miszlai	William Carey University	8 March 2025	
50 breaststroke	23.81	Noel De Geus	Keiser	8 March 2024	
100 breaststroke	51.43	Noel De Geus	Keiser	8 March 2024	
200 breaststroke	1:56.29	Noel De Geus	Keiser	9 March 2024	
50 butterfly	21.42	Isaiah Aleksenko	Keiser	7 March 2025	
100 butterfly	45.21	Isaiah Aleksenko	Keiser	6 March 2026	
200 butterfly	1:45.27	Iran Cacalcante-Almeida	Olivet Nazarene	2018	
200 individual medley	1:44.48	Isaiah Aleksenko	Keiser	5 March 2026	
400 individual medley	3:51.08	Stephen Gilbert	Milligan Buffaloes	4 March 2022	
200 freestyle relay	1:18.27	Noel de Geus; Isaiah Aleksenko; Hanno Boeckmann; Jet Fuhrmann	Keiser	5 March 2026	
400 freestyle relay	2:53.68	Carlos Trinidad Sancho; Isaiah Aleksenko; Dawid Malik; Hanno Boeckmann	Keiser	7 March 2026	
800 freestyle relay	6:30.18	Nestor Montero; Robbie Garden; William Birkett; Daniel Laureyssens	St. Thomas	2024	
200 medley relay	1:26.83	Ramirez, Penny, Sullivan, Lassley	Oklahoma Baptist University	2014	
400 medley relay	3:10.52	Nicklas Pedersen; Noel de Geus; Isaiah Aleksenko; Matheus Querioz	Keiser	March 2025	

=== Meters ===
Event	Time	Swimmer	School	Year
50 freestyle	22.32	Ryan Laurin	Simon Fraser (B.C.)	2001
100 freestyle	49.33	Graham Duthie	Simon Fraser (B.C.)	2001
200 freestyle	1:49.33	Graham Duthie	Simon Fraser (B.C.)	2001
400 freestyle	3:56.72	Graham Duthie	Simon Fraser (B.C)	2001
1500 freestyle	15:59.45	Malcolm Crimp	Simon Fraser (B.C.)	1981
100 backstroke	55.59	Felix Sutanto	California Baptist University	2002
200 backstroke	2:01.31	Felix Sutanto	California Baptist University	2002
100 breaststroke	1:03.73	Mike Wylie	Simon Fraser (B.C.)	2000
200 breaststroke	2:19.26	Audy Oktavian	California Baptist University	2002
100 butterfly	55.47	Sandy Henderson	Simon Fraser (B.C.)	2000
200 butterfly	2:03.67	Klaus Haertel	Simon Fraser (B.C.)	2001
200 individual medley	2:03.65	Libor Janek	Cumberland (Ky.)	2000
400 individual medley	4: 26.01	Libor Janek	Cumberland (Ky.)	2001
200 medley relay	1:27.38	Alex Marrero, Inigo Marina, Miguel Angel Arroyo Garcia, Daniel Laureyssens	St. Thomas	2023
400 medley relay	3:46.90	Felix Sutanto, Joshua Louvier, Matt Sprankle, Matt Berry	California Baptist University	2002
200 freestyle relay	1:30.73	Ryan Laurin, Aaron Lightman, Graham Wood, Graham Duthie	Simon Fraser (B.C.)	2001
400 freestyle relay	3:46.39	Gerry Martselos, Mike Wylie, Klaus Haertel, Graham Wood	Simon Fraser (B.C.)	2001
800 freestyle relay	6:46.13	Klaus Haertel, Tom Gaschler, Graham Wood, Graham Duthie	Simon Fraser (B.C.)	2001
One-meter diving (11 Dives)	587.35	Grant Brehaut	Simon Fraser (B.C.)	2004
Three-meter diving (11 Dives)	561.75	Grant Brehaut	Simon Fraser (B.C.)	2005

== See also ==
- List of college swimming and diving teams
- NAIA Women's Swimming and Diving Championships
- NCAA Men's Swimming and Diving Championships (Division I, Division II, Division III)
- NCAA Women's Swimming and Diving Championships (Division I, Division II, Division III)
