= NAIA women's swimming and diving championships =

Annual college swim meet in North America

NAIA Women's Swimming and Diving Championships
- Founded: 1981; 45 years ago
- Region: United States; Canada
- Current champions: Keiser (FL) (5th)
- Most championships: Simon Fraser (11)
- Website: NAIA.com

The NAIA Women's Swimming and Diving Championships comprise the annual swim meet held, since 1981, to determine the national champions of women's NAIA collegiate swimming and diving in the United States and Canada.

The most successful program are Simon Fraser, with 11 NAIA national titles.

Keiser (FL) are the five-time reigning national champions, winning their most recent title in 2026.

== Results ==
NAIA Women's Swimming and Diving Championships
Year	Site	Championship Results			
Year	Site	Winner	Points	Runners-up	Points
1981; Details	Liberty, MO	Simon Fraser	636	Western State (CO)	332
1982; Details	Burnaby, BC	Simon Fraser (2)	625	Shepherd	402
1983; Details	Arkadelphia, AR	Wisconsin–Eau Claire	406	Pacific Lutheran	387
1984; Details	Arkadelphia, AR	Wisconsin–Green Bay	397	Wisconsin–Eau Claire	290
1985; Details	Indianapolis, IN	Simon Fraser (3)	313	Central Washington	303
1986; Details	Spokane, WA	Central Washington	378.5	Pacific Lutheran	331
1987; Details	Milwaukee, WI	Wisconsin–Eau Claire (2)	538	Central Washington	497
1988; Details	Orlando, FL	Wisconsin–Eau Claire (3)	472	Puget Sound	456
1989; Details	Brown Deer, WI	Puget Sound	599	Wisconsin–Eau Claire	490.5
1990; Details	Canton, OH	Puget Sound (2)	752	Simon Fraser	422
1991; Details	Federal Way, WA	Simon Fraser (4)	571	Puget Sound	562
1992; Details	Canton, OH	Drury	621	Puget Sound	583
1993; Details	San Antonio, TX	Drury (2)	637	Puget Sound	630.5
1994; Details	Federal Way, WA	Drury (3)	726	Puget Sound	576
1995; Details	San Antonio, TX	Simon Fraser (5)	828	Puget Sound	551
1996; Details	San Antonio, TX	Puget Sound (3)	602.5	Simon Fraser	429
1997; Details	Federal Way, WA	Simon Fraser (6)	750	Puget Sound	505
1998; Details	Federal Way, WA	Puget Sound (4)	682	Simon Fraser	680
1999; Details	Federal Way, WA	Puget Sound (5)	761	Simon Fraser	755
2000; Details	Burnaby, BC	Simon Fraser (7)	547	California Baptist	315.5
2001; Details	Burnaby, BC	Simon Fraser (8)	485	California Baptist	342
2002; Details	Burnaby, BC	Simon Fraser (9)	488	Seattle	435
2003; Details	Lawrence, KS	Simon Fraser (10)	578	California Baptist	519
2004; Details	Lawrence, KS	Simon Fraser (11)	548	California Baptist	421
2005; Details	St. Peters, MO	California Baptist	551	Simon Fraser	496
2006; Details	St. Peters, MO	California Baptist (2)	457	SCAD Savannah	336
2007; Details	San Antonio, TX	California Baptist (3)	783.5	Simon Fraser	584
2008; Details	San Antonio, TX	California Baptist (4)	729	Simon Fraser	585
2009; Details	St. Peters, MO	SCAD Savannah	691	California Baptist	639.5
2010; Details	St. Peters, MO	SCAD Savannah (2)	540	California Baptist	472
2011; Details	St. Peters, MO	California Baptist (5)	616	Fresno Pacific	459
2012; Details	Oklahoma City, OK	Fresno Pacific	780	Oklahoma Baptist	578
2013; Details	Oklahoma City, OK	Oklahoma Baptist	845	SCAD Savannah	600
2014; Details	Oklahoma City, OK	Oklahoma Baptist (2)	849	SCAD Savannah	492
2015; Details	Oklahoma City, OK	Oklahoma Baptist (3)	745	SCAD Savannah	481
2016; Details	Columbus, GA	SCAD Savannah (3)	753	Olivet Nazarene	502.5
2017; Details	Columbus, GA	Olivet Nazarene	639	SCAD Savannah	632.5
2018; Details	Columbus, GA	SCAD Savannah (4)	603.5	Olivet Nazarene	519
2019; Details	Columbus, GA	SCAD Savannah (5)	638.5	Keiser	477.5
2020; Details	Knoxville, TN	SCAD Savannah (6)	767.5	Keiser	624
2021	Cancelled due to the COVID-19 pandemic				
2022; Details	Columbus, GA	Keiser	785	SCAD Savannah	469
2023; Details	Columbus, GA	Keiser (2)	771	SCAD Savannah	440
2024; Details	Columbus, GA	Keiser (3)	655.5	St. Thomas (FL)	405
2025; Details	Elkhart, IN	Keiser (4)	731	SCAD Savannah	352
2026; Details	Elkhart, IN	Keiser (5)	633	SCAD Savannah	527

== Champions ==
Team national championships among active programs: 6, 5, 1

=== Active NAIA programs ===
Team	Titles	Years
SCAD Savannah	6	2009, 2010, 2016, 2018, 2019, 2020
Keiser	5	2022, 2023, 2024, 2025, 2026
Olivet Nazarene	1	2017

=== Former NAIA programs ===
Team	Titles	Years
Simon Fraser	10	1981, 1982, 1985, 1991, 1995, 1997, 2000, 2001, 2002, 2003, 2004
California Baptist	5	2005, 2006, 2007, 2008, 2011
Puget Sound	5	1989, 1990, 1996, 1998, 1999
Oklahoma Baptist	3	2013, 2014, 2015
Drury	3	1992, 1993, 1994
Wisconsin–Eau Claire	3	1983, 1987, 1988
Fresno Pacific	1	2012
Central Washington	1	1986
Green Bay	1	1984

== Championship records ==
=== Yards ===
Event	Time		Name	Club	Date	Location	Ref
50 freestyle	22.29		Cheyenne Coffman	Fresno Pacific	2012		
100 freestyle	48.91		Kristen de Goede	Lindsey Wilson	8 March 2025	Elkhart, Indiana	
200 freestyle	1:47.34	h	Kristen de Goede	Lindsey Wilson	7 March 2025	Elkhart, Indiana	
500 freestyle	4:52.24		Alex Peters	Concordia	2011		
1650 freestyle	16:43.37		Kathryn Rosberg	Simon Fraser	2007		
100 backstroke	52.76		Cheyenne Coffman	Fresno Pacific	2012		
200 backstroke	1:56.87		Amanda Moran	Olivet Nazarene	2017		
100 breaststroke	1:00.13		Nikoline Biltoft-Jensen	(Denmark); Keiser	10 March 2025	Elkhart, Indiana	
200 breaststroke	2:12.45		Stella Warborn	St. Thomas	8 March 2025	Elkhart, Indiana	
100 butterfly	53.70		Lisa Tixier	Biola	3 March 2017		
200 butterfly	2:00.89		Christine Tixier	Biola	2015		
200 individual medley	2:01.49		Katherine Dyer	Keiser	6 March 2025	Elkhart, Indiana	
400 individual medley	4:21.33		Katherine Dyer	The Master's	7 March 2025	Elkhart, Indiana	
4×50 freestyle relay	1:31.91		Laura Galarza (22.85); Emma Forbes-Milne (22.84); Tamlyn Price (23.31); Andrea Antonissen (22.91)	Oklahoma Baptist	2015		
4×100 freestyle relay	3:22.37		Megan Sutanto (51.63); Kylee Sears (51.52); Clara Patterson (49.85); Katherine Dyer (49.37)	The Master's	7 March 2026	Elkhart, Indiana	
4×200 freestyle relay	7:22.55		Natalia Janiszewska (1:50.71); Alanis Santiago (1:49.66); Rachel Bradley (1:57.01); Luiza Bersi (1:45.17)	Keiser	4 March 2026	Elkhart, Indiana	
4×50 medley relay	1:40.52		Natalia Janiszewska (23.25); Kate Vorontsova (28.41); Luiza Bersi (23.65); Boglarka Zsunics (23.21)	Keiser	4 March 2026	Elkhart, Indiana	
4×100 medley relay	3:41.24		Natalia Janiszewska (54.71); Kate Vorontsova (1:03.49); Luiza Bersi (52.80); Alanis Santiago (50.24)	Keiser	6 March 2026	Elkhart, Indiana	

Legend: # – Record awaiting ratification by National Association of Intercollegiate Athletics;
Records not set in finals: h – heat; sf – semifinal; r – relay 1st leg; rh – relay heat 1st leg; b – B final; † – en route to final mark; so – swim-off; tt – time trial

== See also ==
- List of college swimming and diving teams
- NAIA Men's Swimming and Diving Championships
- AIAW Women's Swimming and Diving Championships
- NCAA Women's Swimming and Diving Championships (Division I, Division II, Division III)
- NCAA Men's Swimming and Diving Championships (Division I, Division II, Division III)
