= NAIA competitive cheer championship =

Annual college competitive cheerleading tournament

- Sport: Competitive cheerleading
- Founded: 2017
- No. of teams: 15
- Country: United States
- Most recent champion: Xavier (LA) (2nd)
- Most titles: Saint Ambrose (3)
- Website: NAIA.com

The NAIA competitive cheer championship is an annual meet hosted by the National Association of Intercollegiate Athletics to determine the national champion of collegiate team competitive cheerleading among its members in the United States.

The inaugural meet was held in 2017. Each year, it is held concurrently and at the same venue as the NAIA competitive dance championship.

The most successful program is Saint Ambrose, with three titles.

The reigning national champions are Xavier (LA), who won their second national title in 2026.

== Results ==
NAIA competitive cheer championship
| Year | Site | Championship results | | | |
| Year | Site | Champion | Points | Runner-up | Points |
|---|---|---|---|---|---|
| 2017; Details | Oklahoma City, OK | Oklahoma City | 87.08 | Saint Francis (IL) | 82.93 |
| 2018; Details | Oklahoma City, OK | Missouri Valley | 86.45 | Oklahoma City | 85.42 |
| 2019; Details | (Iowa); Davenport, IA | Concordia Ann Arbor | 82.12 | Oklahoma City | 81.0 |
2020
| 2021; Details | (Iowa); Davenport, IA | Oklahoma City (2) | 91.53 | Saint Ambrose | 91.10 |
| 2022; Details | (Michigan); Ypsilanti, MI | Xavier (LA) | 93.70 | Indiana Wesleyan | 92.58 |
| 2023; Details | (Michigan); Ypsilanti, MI | Saint Ambrose | 95.51 | Concordia Ann Arbor | 90.76 |
| 2024; Details | (Michigan); Ypsilanti, MI | Saint Ambrose (2) | 97.28 | Xavier (LA) | 96.91 |
| 2025; Details | (Michigan); Ypsilanti, MI | Saint Ambrose (3) | 97.95 | Xavier (LA) | 97.39 |
| 2026; Details | (Kansas); Topeka, KS | Xavier (LA) (2) | 96.13 | Indiana Wesleyan | 92.72 |
| 2027; Details | (Kansas); Topeka, KS | | | | |

== Champions ==
| Team | Titles | Years |
|---|---|---|
| St. Ambrose | 3 | 2023, 2024, 2025 |
| Oklahoma City | 2 | 2017, 2021 |
| Xavier (LA) | 2 | 2022, 2026 |
| Concordia Ann Arbor | 1 | 2019 |
| Missouri Valley | 1 | 2018 |

== See also ==
- NAIA competitive dance championship
