= Keiser University – College of Golf =

Coordinates: 26.715162°N 80.104770°W

Keiser University – College of Golf is a campus located in West Palm Beach, Florida, United States. The College of Golf in Keiser University offers an Associate of Science Degree in Golf Management and a Bachelor's Degree in Golf Management.

== Campus ==
Keiser University – College of Golf consists of 1,500+ square feet of indoor golf instructional space.

== Accreditation ==
Keiser University is accredited by the Commission on Colleges of the Southern Association of Colleges and Schools (SACS) to award certificates and degrees at the associate, bachelors, masters, and doctoral levels.

Students can earn credits toward those required for PGA membership.
