= NAIA competitive dance championship =

Annual college dance championship

- Sport: Competitive dance
- Founded: 2017
- Country: United States
- Most recent champion: St. Ambrose (5th)
- Most titles: St. Ambrose (5)
- Website: NAIA.com

The NAIA competitive dance championship is an annual competition hosted by the National Association of Intercollegiate Athletics to determine the national champion of collegiate team competitive dance among its members in the United States.

The inaugural event was held in 2017. Each year, it is held concurrently and at the same venue as the NAIA competitive cheer championship.

St. Ambrose have been the most successful program, with five titles.

The reigning national champions are St. Ambrose, who won their fifth national title in 2026.

== Results ==
NAIA competitive dance championship
Year	Site	Championship results			
Year	Site	Champion	Points	Runner-up	Points
2017; Details	Oklahoma City, OK	Midland	91.38	Aquinas (MI)	86.63
2018; Details	Oklahoma City, OK	St. Ambrose	89.21	Oklahoma City	88.71
2019; Details	(Iowa); Davenport, IA	Midland (2)	86.35	St. Ambrose	85.46
2020	Cancelled due to the COVID-19 pandemic				
2021; Details	(Iowa); Davenport, IA	St. Ambrose (2)	88.72	Oklahoma City	84.55
2022; Details	(Michigan); Ypsilanti, MI	Morningside	92.31	St. Ambrose	92.17
2023; Details	(Michigan); Ypsilanti, MI	St. Ambrose (3)	93.40	Midland	89.76
2024; Details	(Michigan); Ypsilanti, MI	St. Ambrose (4)	92.49	Midland	92.13
2025; Details	(Michigan); Ypsilanti, MI	Midland (3)	92.24	St. Ambrose	92.08
2026; Details	(Kansas); Topeka, KS	St. Ambrose (5)	93.37	Midland	93.10
2027; Details	(Kansas); Topeka, KS				

== Champions ==
Team	Titles	Years
St. Ambrose	5	2018, 2021, 2023, 2024, 2026
Midland	3	2017, 2019, 2025
Morningside	1	2022

== See also ==
- NAIA competitive cheer championship
