= NAIA women's bowling championship =

American bowling tournament

- Sport: College bowling
- Founded: 2020
- Country: United States
- Most recent champion: Pikeville (1st)
- Most titles: SCAD Savannah (3)
- Website: NAIA.com

The NAIA women's bowling championship is an annual tournament hosted by the National Association of Intercollegiate Athletics to determine the national champion of collegiate women's team ten-pin bowling among its members in the United States.

The inaugural championship was originally scheduled to be held in 2020 but was delayed to 2021 due to the COVID-19 pandemic in the United States. The tournament is held concurrently and at the same location as the NAIA men's bowling championship.

The reigning national champions are Pikeville, who won their first title in 2026.

== Results ==
NAIA women's bowling championship
Year	Site	Championship match			Tournament MVP
Year	Site	Champion	Match score	Runner-up	Tournament MVP
2020	Cancelled due to the COVID-19 pandemic				
2021; Details	(Michigan); Detroit, MI	Indiana Tech	3–1–1	Midland	Maryssa Carey (Indiana Tech)
2022; Details	(Michigan); Sterling Heights, MI	SCAD Savannah	3–2	Midland	Lara Kurt (SCAD Savannah)
2023; Details	(Michigan); Sterling Heights, MI	SCAD Savannah (2)	3–1	Madonna	Pamela Perez (SCAD Savannah)
2024; Details	(Michigan); Sterling Heights, MI	SCAD Savannah (3)	4–1	Pikeville	Addy Nelson (SCAD Savannah)
2025; Details	(Michigan); Sterling Heights, MI	Spring Arbor	4–3	Concordia	Kayla Tafanelli (Spring Arbor)
2026; Details	(Michigan); Lansing, MI	Pikeville	4–0	SCAD Savannah	Brianna Rogers (Pikeville)
2027; Details	(Michigan); Lansing, MI				

== Champions ==
Rank	Team	Titles
1	SCAD Savannah	3
2	Indiana Tech	1
2	Pikeville	1
2	Spring Arbor	1

== See also ==
- NAIA men's bowling championship
- NCAA bowling championship
