= NAIA men's bowling championship =

Annual college bowling tournament

- Sport: College bowling
- Founded: 2020
- Country: United States
- Most recent champion: Mount Mercy (1st)
- Most titles: Indiana Tech (1); Lawrence Tech (1); Marian (1); Mount Mercy (1); SCAD (1); St. Francis (IL) (1)
- Website: NAIA.com

The NAIA men's bowling championship is an annual tournament hosted by the National Association of Intercollegiate Athletics to determine the national champion of collegiate men's team ten-pin bowling among its members in the United States.

The inaugural championship was originally scheduled to be held in 2020 but was delayed to 2021 due to the COVID-19 pandemic in the United States. The tournament is held concurrently and at the same location as the NAIA women's bowling championship.

The reigning national champions are Mount Mercy, who won their first title in 2026.

== Results ==
NAIA men's bowling championship
Year	Site	Championship match			Tournament MVP
Year	Site	Champion	Match score	Runner-up	Tournament MVP
2020	Cancelled due to the COVID-19 pandemic				
2021; Details	(Michigan); Detroit, MI	St. Francis (IL)	3–2	Martin Methodist	Robert Kicmal (St. Francis (IL))
2022; Details	(Michigan); Sterling Heights, MI	Indiana Tech	3–2	St. Francis (IL)	Marcus McClain (Indiana Tech)
2023; Details	(Michigan); Sterling Heights, MI	Lawrence Tech	3–1	Marian	Jacob Kujawa (Lawrence Tech)
2024; Details	(Michigan); Sterling Heights, MI	SCAD	4–1	Indiana Tech	Tyrell Ingalls (SCAD)
2025; Details	(Michigan); Sterling Heights, MI	Marian	4–0	SCAD	Dylan Mollo (Marian)
2026; Details	(Michigan); Lansing, MI	Mount Mercy	4–1	Marian	Blake Walsh (Mount Mercy)
2027; Details	(Michigan); Lansing, MI				

== Champions ==
Rank	Team	Titles
1	Indiana Tech	1
1	Lawrence Tech	1
1	Marian	1
1	Mount Mercy	1
1	SCAD	1
1	St. Francis (IL)	1

== See also ==
- NAIA women's bowling championship
- NCAA bowling championship
