= Claremont-Mudd-Scripps Stags and Athenas =

Joint intercollegiate sports program in California, US

- University: Claremont McKenna College; Harvey Mudd College; Scripps College
- Nickname: Stags (men); Athenas (women)
- NCAA: Division III
- Conference: SCIAC
- Athletic director: Erica Perkins Jasper
- Location: Claremont, California
- Football stadium: Fritz B. Burns Stadium
- Basketball arena: Roberts Pavilion
- Baseball stadium: Bill Arce Field
- Softball stadium: Softball Field
- Soccer stadium: John Pritzlaff Field
- Aquatics center: Matt M. Axelrood Pool
- Lacrosse stadium: John Zinda Field
- Other venues: Biszantz Family Tennis Center
- Colors: Cardinal and Gold
- Website: cmsathletics.org
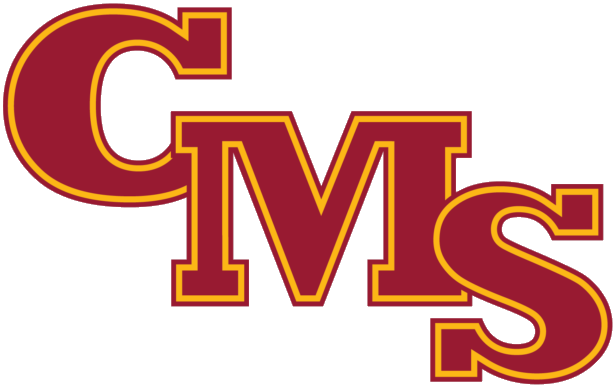

The Claremont-Mudd-Scripps Stags (men) and Athenas (women) is the joint intercollegiate sports program of Claremont McKenna College, Harvey Mudd College, and Scripps College, all located in Claremont, California. The teams participate in the NCAA's Division III as a member of the Southern California Intercollegiate Athletic Conference.

According to the Division III Fall Learfield Director's Cup Standings for the 2016–2017 year, CMS ranks 12th among all Division III programs, and first among SCIAC colleges.

== Varsity teams ==
Claremont-Mudd-Scripps competes in 21 men's and women's varsity sports. They have won 7 national championships and 346 SCIAC Championships.

Men's sports	Women's sports
Baseball	Basketball
Basketball	Cross country
Cross country	Golf
Football	Lacrosse
Golf	Soccer
Soccer	Softball
Swimming & diving	Swimming & diving
Tennis	Tennis
Track and field^{1}	Track and field^{1}
Water polo	Volleyball
	Water polo
^{1} – includes both indoor and outdoor.

== Facilities ==
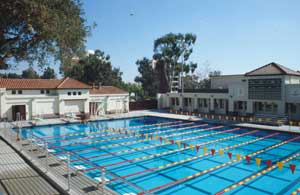
Matt M. Axelrood Pool

Venue	Sport(s)	Ref.
Bill Arce Field	Baseball	
Roberts Pavilion	Basketball; Volleyball	
Fritz B. Burns Stadium	Football; Lacrosse; Track and field (Note: At the Burns Track Complex.)	
John Pritzlaff Field	Soccer	
Athena Field	Softball	
Matt M. Axelrood Pool	Swimming	
Biszantz Family Center	Tennis	
Parents Field (Note: For practices only, not used in official matches.)	Soccer; Lacrosse	

== National champions ==
*NCAA Division III unless otherwise noted.

Team	Titles	Winning years
Golf (m)	5	2010 – Tain Lee, 2013 – Bradley Shigezawa, 2016 – Team, 2026 – Team, Sebi Aliaga – 2026
Swimming (m)	7	1967 – Team (NAIA), 1969 – Eric Jones (50y) (NAIA), 1969 – David Tempkin (100, 200 Butterfly) (NAIA), 1970 – Eric Jones (50y, 100y) (NAIA), 1970 – David Tempkin (100, 200 Butterfly) (NAIA), 2014 – Matt Williams (100 Backstroke), 2022 - Frank Applebaum (200 Butterfly)
Swimming (w)	2	2002 – Suzy Nicoletti (200 Breast), 2003 – Lisal Smith (400 IM)
Tennis (m)	4	1981 – Team, 1992 – Ryan McKee & Chris Noyes (Doubles), 1993 – Ryan McKee (Individual, Doubles), Tim Cooley (Doubles), 2015 – Team
Tennis (w)	2	2018 – Team, 2019 – Catherine Allen & Caroline Cox (doubles)
Track and field (m)	5	1986 – Carl Giles (Hammer), 1994 – Jason Rhodes (800m), Mike Susank (Hammer), 1997 – Quang Leba (Javelin), 2004 – Matt Roberson (Decathlon), 2006 – Matt Roberson (Decathlon)
Track and field (w)	6	1985 – Gwyn Hardesty (3000m), 1998 – Jennifer Culley (400m), 2016 – Tyra Abraham (100m), 2018 – Tyra Abraham (100m), 2018 – Bryn McKillop (5000m), 2018 – Emily Bassett (Hammer)
Volleyball (w)	1	2017
Water polo (w)	2	1992 (Collegiate II), 2001 (Collegiate III)

== Rivals ==
The other sports combination of the Claremont Colleges is the team made up of Pomona College and Pitzer College known as Pomona–Pitzer Sagehens. It is known by the student body as the Sixth Street Rivalry.
