= Keiser Seahawks =

Athletics team for Keiser University in West Palm Beach, Florida

Coordinates: 26.1860°N 80.1638°W

- University: Keiser University
- Nickname: Seahawks
- Association: NAIA
- Conference: The Sun (primary)
- Athletic director: Kris Swogger
- Location: West Palm Beach, Florida
- Varsity teams: 24 (11 men's, 11 women's, 2 co-ed)
- Football stadium: Keiser Multi-Purpose Field
- Basketball arena: Massimino Court
- Baseball stadium: Silvester Field
- Softball stadium: Alumni Field
- Soccer stadium: Arrigo-Vecellio Field
- Aquatics center: Lake Lytal Aquatic Center
- Lacrosse stadium: Keiser Multi-Purpose Field
- Tennis venue: Patch Reef Park
- Colors: Navy Blue and Sky Blue
- Website: kuseahawks.com/index.aspx
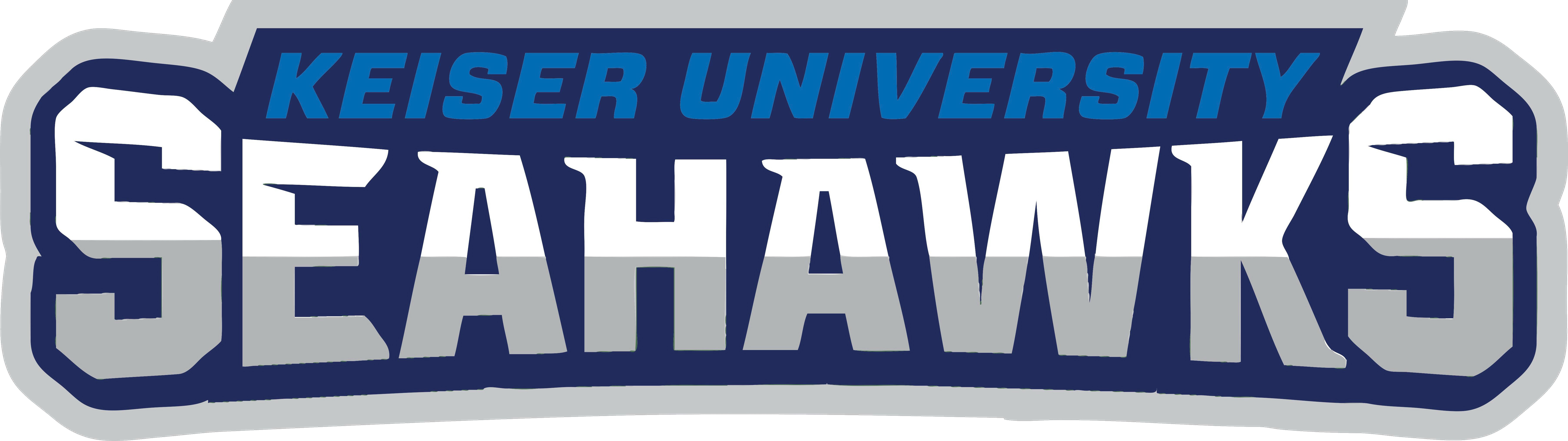

The Keiser Seahawks are the athletic teams that represent Keiser University, located in West Palm Beach, Florida, in intercollegiate sports as a member of the National Association of Intercollegiate Athletics (NAIA), primarily competing in the Sun Conference since the 2015–16 academic year. Prior to July 2015, the Seahawks represented Northwood University's Florida campus in West Palm Beach.

== Varsity teams ==
Keiser competes in 24 intercollegiate varsity sports:

Men's sports	Women's sports
Baseball	Basketball
Basketball	Cross country
Cross country	Flag football
Football	Golf
Golf	Lacrosse
Lacrosse	Soccer
Soccer	Softball
Swimming	Swimming
Tennis	Tennis
Track and field^{1}	Track and field^{1}
Wrestling	Volleyball
Co-ed sports
Esports
Cheer and dance
^{1} – includes both indoor and outdoor

=== Basketball ===
Basketball was started in the 2006–2007 season, after the hiring of Rollie Massimino in 2005, as Director of Basketball Operations for both men's and women's basketball. Per ESPN, on December 14, 2016, Massimino, Keiser University's men's basketball coach, became the third active coach to achieve 800 career wins and the ninth coach overall. Massimino was 82 years old at the time.

=== Football ===
In 2016, Keiser announced its plan to add football to its slate of varsity athletic programs, with the team beginning play in the 2018 season. In 2021, the Seahawks football team advanced to the NAIA quarterfinals for the second straight year. In 2023, the Seahawks football team won its first NAIA Football National Championship, defeating Northwestern College 31–21.

=== Golf ===
The Seahawks Women's golf team have won four NAIA Women's Golf National Championships (2003, 2015, 2016, 2021). In 2022, the Seahawks Men's golf team won their first NAIA Men's Golf National Championship, while also having their first individual golf national champion.

=== Soccer ===
Both the Seahawks Men's and Women's soccer teams have won national championships. The Women's soccer team won back-to-back national championships in 2019 and 2020. The Men's soccer team collected its first national championship in 2021.

=== Swimming ===
The Keiser Men's Swim team won the NAIA Men's Swimming National Championship three consecutive years in 2018, 2019, and 2020. With the 2021 championships canceled due to the COVID-19 pandemic, they would follow up by winning their fourth straight national title in 2022. In 2022, the Keiser Women's Swim team won their first NAIA Women's Swimming National Championship.

=== Wrestling ===
The 2019–20 season marked the inaugural year of the Keiser men's wrestling team. Keiser, along with Southeastern University and St. Thomas University, are the only current institutions that sponsor scholarship wrestling programs in Florida.

=== Cheer and Dance ===
The Keiser Cheer and Dance team made their inaugural appearance at the 2025 NCA & NDA Collegiate Cheer and Dance Championship, held April 10–12 at the Ocean Center in Daytona Beach, Florida.

This marked the first time Keiser competed at the national level in both competitive cheer and competitive dance collegiate events. During their debut, the Seahawks achieved a runner-up (2nd place) finish in their division.

== Championships ==
=== Team national championships ===
The Seahawks have won 26 team national championships.

Sport / team	Association	Competition	Titles	Winning years
Football	NAIA	National championship	1	2023
Golf (men's)	NAIA	National championship	1	2022
Golf (women's)	NAIA	National championship	5	2003, (Note: Championship won when team competed as Northwood University–Florida) 2015, 2016, 2021, 2024
Lacrosse (men's)	NAIA	National championship	3	2023, 2024, 2025
Lacrosse (women's)	NAIA	National championship	1	2021
Soccer (men's)	NAIA	National championship	1	2021
Soccer (women's)	NAIA	National championship	2	2019, 2020
Swimming (men's)	NAIA	National championship	6	2018, 2019, 2020, 2022, 2023, 2025
Swimming (women's)	NAIA	National championship	4	2022, 2023, 2024, 2025
Tennis (men's)	NAIA	National championship	1	2025
Tennis (women's)	NAIA	National championship	1	2003

=== NACDA Directors' Cup ===
The Seahawks won the NACDA Directors' Cup for being the NAIA's highest performing overall athletic program for the 2020–21 season.

== Club sports ==
- Equestrian
- Fishing
- Golf

== Notable athletes and coaches ==
- Nick Akoto, American professional soccer player
- Dante Calabria, men's basketball head coach from 2017–2018
- Noah Curtis, CFL defensive lineman
- Evan Finnegan, Irish soccer player who played as an attacking full−back
- Maja Henriksson, Swedish professional soccer player
- Brianna Hernandez-Silva, flag football player for United States women's national team
- Ashlea Klam, flag football player for United States women's national team
- Lisa Lilja, Swedish sprinter, specializing in the 200 metres and 400 metres
- Rollie Massimino, men's basketball head coach from 2006–2017
- Aaron Molloy, Irish professional soccer player
- Thobias Montler, Swedish long jumper, won silver medal at the 2022 World Indoor Championships
- Doug Socha, football head coach 2017–2023
- Shea Spencer, football quartback 2019–2025, program's all-time leader in career passing yards and passing touchdowns
- Stanley Whittaker, American professional basketball player
- Stefan Zečević, Serbian professional basketball player
