= Keiser University =

Private university in Florida, US

- Former names: The Keiser School (1977–1982); Keiser Institute of Technology (1982–1986); Keiser College (1986–2006)
- Motto: Integritas, Veritas, Sapientia (Latin)
- Motto in English: "Purity, Truth, Wisdom"
- Type: Private university
- Established: 1977; 49 years ago
- Accreditation: SACS
- Academic affiliations: ICUF
- Chancellor: Arthur Keiser
- Students: 21,306 (fall 2024)
- Undergraduates: 18,452 (fall 2024)
- Postgraduates: 2,854 (fall 2024)
- Location: Fort Lauderdale, Florida, United States; 26.1860°N 80.1638°W
- Campus: Midsize city
- Other campuses: List: Clearwater; Daytona Beach; Fort Myers; Jacksonville; Lakeland; Melbourne; Miami; Naples; New Port Richey; Orlando; Patrick SFB; Pembroke Pines; Port Saint Lucie; Sarasota; Tallahassee; Tampa; West Palm Beach; Colombo; Guayaquil; Hanoi; Ho Chi Minh City; Hue City; Jakarta; Kandy; Kurunegala; Lima; Managua; Marbella; Mumbai; Negombo; San Marcos; Santa Cruz; Shanghai
- Newspaper: Seahawk Nation
- Colors: Navy blue and sky blue
- Nickname: Seahawks
- Sporting affiliations: NAIA – The Sun
- Mascot: The Keiser Seahawk
- Website: keiseruniversity.edu
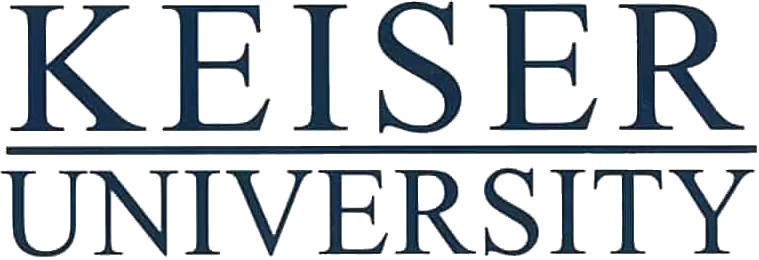

Keiser University is a private university with its main campus in Fort Lauderdale, Florida, United States. Its flagship residential campus is in West Palm Beach, Florida, and additional campuses are located in other parts of Florida and internationally. Keiser provides educational programs at the undergraduate, graduate, and doctorate levels in both traditional and online delivery formats. The school is institutionally accredited by the Southern Association of Colleges and Schools.

== History ==
In 1977, Arthur Keiser and his mother, Evelyn, created a career college called the Keiser School in Fort Lauderdale to prepare students for jobs in Florida's growing business and healthcare communities. In 1982, with the addition of paralegal and computer programs, the school changed its name to the Keiser Institute of Technology. In 1986, the school began to award associate degrees and became Keiser College. In 2001, Keiser created its first bachelor's degree programs. Five years later, in 2006, the school made its final name change and became Keiser University.

In 2010, the Florida Attorney General began to investigate Keiser University and several other for-profit schools based in the state, but by 2012 the investigation was closed and Keiser entered into an "assurance of voluntary compliance". In 2011, the university switched from a for-profit to a not-for-profit model, when Arthur Keiser sold the institution for an undisclosed sum to Everglades College Inc., a non-profit entity founded by Keiser that also operates Everglades University.

In 2015, Keiser University added a 100-acre flagship residential campus in West Palm Beach, on the site of what was formerly Northwood University's Florida campus. The goal of this expansion was to help in providing students with a residential, traditional, educational experience in West Palm Beach, Florida. In 2016, the university launched the new college of Chiropractic Medicine, with Michael Wiles serving as the Dean. This is the first program of its kind started in South Florida.

In 2017, CEO and President Arthur Keiser became chair of the U.S. Department of Education's National Advisory Committee on Institutional Quality and Integrity (NACIQI). Keiser was first appointed by then Secretary of Education Margaret Spellings and reappointed twice by Republicans.

== Licensure and accreditation ==
Keiser University is accredited by the Commission on Colleges of the Southern Association of Colleges and Schools to award certificates and degrees at the associate, baccalaureate, master's and doctoral levels. Keiser University is licensed by the Commission for Independent Education in Florida.

== Recognition and rankings ==
- In 2022-23, U.S. News & World Report ranked Keiser University #219 in National Universities (tie) and #1 in Top Performers on Social Mobility.
- In 2021, U.S. News & World Report ranked Keiser University #284 (tie) out of all national universities and #11 (tie) in "Top Performers of Social Mobility."
- In 2020, U.S. News & World Report ranked Keiser University #272 (tie) out of all national universities and #34 (tie) in "Top Performers of Social Mobility."
- In 2019, Washington Monthly ranked Keiser University 263rd out of 395 schools on its national universities list. This ranking is based on three broad categories: social mobility, research, and promoting public service.
- In 2018, Money magazine rated Keiser University - Fort Lauderdale at #8 in top colleges for the money in Florida.

== Athletics ==
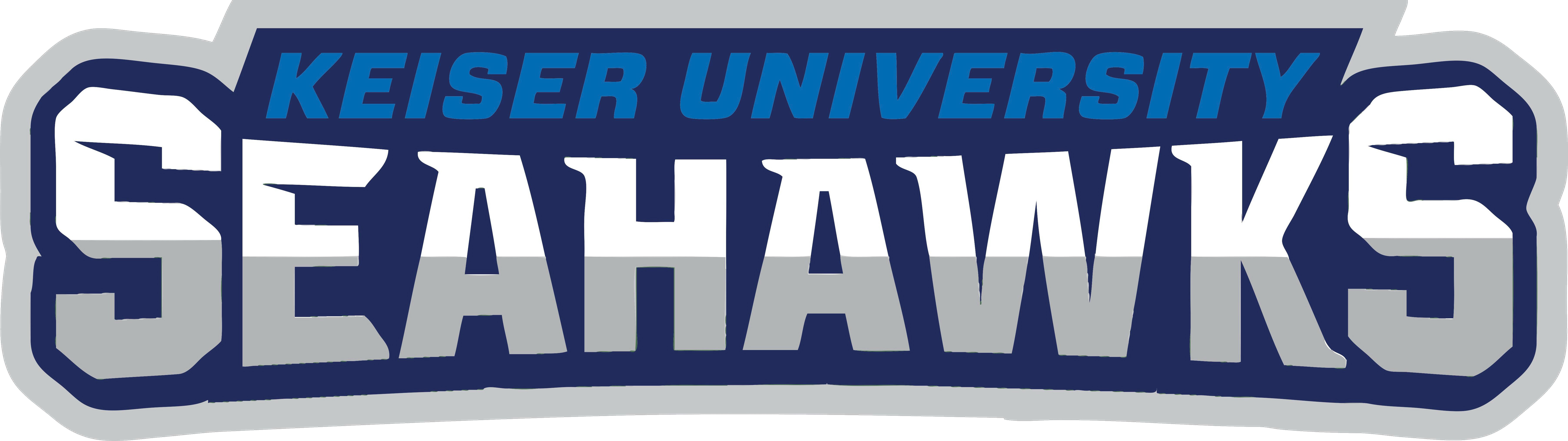
Keiser athletics wordmark

The Keiser athletic teams are called the Seahawks. The university is a member of the National Association of Intercollegiate Athletics (NAIA) and primarily compete in the Sun Conference for most sports since the 2015–16 academic year. Prior to July 2015, the Seahawks represented Northwood University's Florida campus in West Palm Beach.

The Seahawks have won team national championships in both men's and women's golf, lacrosse, soccer, swimming and tennis. The Keiser Seahawks football team won the programs first NAIA national championship in 2023. During the 2020–21 academic year, the Seahawks won the NACDA Directors' Cup for having the most success in collegiate athletics amongst NAIA colleges and universities.

== International programs ==
In December 2024, EQuest Education Group announced a partnership with Keiser University and launched the Center of Keiser University Programs in Vietnam (KUV), which delivers Keiser University programs in Vietnam. The center succeeded Broward Vietnam, an international center affiliated with Broward College that had operated in Vietnam since 2012 and offered associate degree programs.

The center does not hold its own license. Programs are delivered under foreign joint-training registrations issued to Viet My College in Ho Chi Minh City and Hanoi, and to Phu Xuan University in Huế.

Courses are taught in English. Students may complete their studies entirely in Vietnam or begin there and transfer to Keiser University campuses in the United States or to other partner institutions. Associate and bachelor's programs are offered in information technology, business administration, hospitality management and graphic arts and design, with business analytics and artificial intelligence added in 2026.

The Vietnam programs are not separately accredited in the United States; they rely on Keiser University's institutional accreditation.

== See also ==
- Keiser University-Latin American Campus
- Keiser University – College of Golf
