= National Association of Intercollegiate Athletics =

North American college athletics association

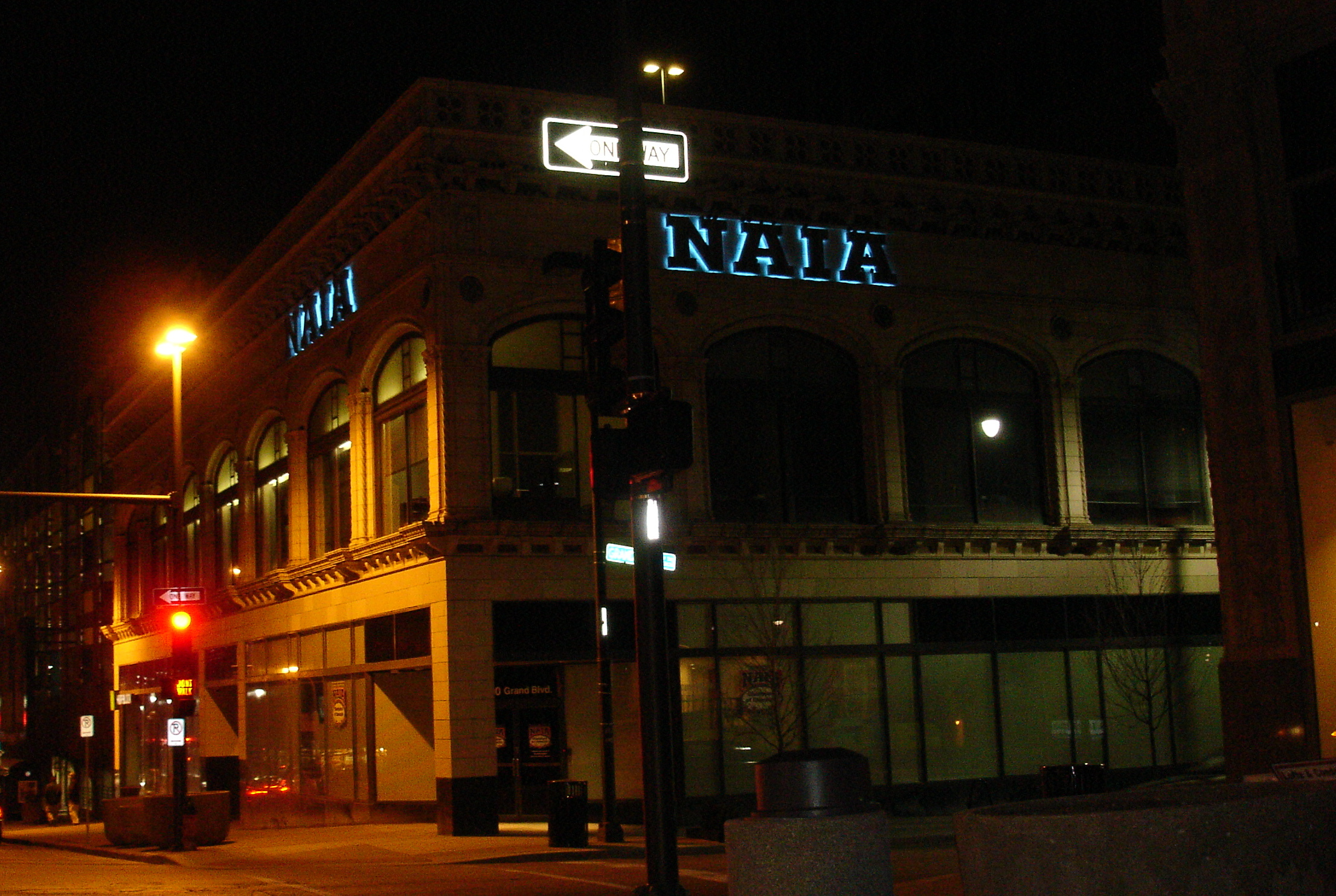
- NAIA headquarters in Downtown Kansas City, pictured in 2008
- Abbreviation: NAIA
- Formation: 1940; 86 years ago
- Legal status: Association
- Headquarters: 120 W. 12th Street, Suite 700; Kansas City, Missouri, U.S. 64105
- Region served: United States, Canada, and U.S. Virgin Islands
- Members: 235
- President: Jim Carr
- COO: Lynn Parman
- Main organ: NAIA Council of Presidents
- Website: naia.org

The National Association of Intercollegiate Athletics (NAIA) established in 1940, is a college athletics association for colleges and universities in North America. Most colleges and universities in the NAIA offer athletic scholarships to their student athletes. Around $1.3 billion in athletic scholarship financial aid is awarded to student athletes annually.

For the 2025–26 season, it has 235 member institutions, of which three are in British Columbia, one in the U.S. Virgin Islands, and the rest in the Contiguous United States, with over 83,000 student-athletes participating. The NAIA, whose headquarters is in Kansas City, Missouri, sponsors 28 national championships. CBS Sports Network, formerly called CSTV, serves as the national media outlet for the NAIA. In 2014, ESPNU began carrying the NAIA Football National Championship.

== History ==
In 1937, James Naismith and local leaders, including George Goldman and Emil S. Liston, staged the first National College Basketball Tournament at Municipal Auditorium in Kansas City, Missouri, of which Goldman was director, one year before the first National Invitation Tournament and two years before the first NCAA tournament. The goal of the tournament was to establish a forum for small colleges and universities to determine a national basketball champion. The original eight-team tournament expanded to 32 teams in 1938. On March 10, 1940, the National Association for Intercollegiate Basketball (NAIB) was formed in Kansas City, Missouri.

In 1952, the NAIB was transformed into the NAIA, and with that came the sponsorship of additional sports such as men's golf, tennis and outdoor track and field. Football in the NAIA was split into two divisions in 1970, based on enrollment (Divisions I and II); it was consolidated back into a single division in 1997.

=== African-American participation ===
The 1948 NAIB national tournament was the first intercollegiate postseason to feature a Black student-athlete, Clarence Walker of Indiana State under coach John Wooden. Wooden had withdrawn from the 1947 tournament because the NAIB would not allow Walker to play.

The association furthered its commitment to African-American athletes when, in 1953, it became the first collegiate association to invite historically black colleges and universities into its membership. In 1957, Tennessee A&I (now Tennessee State) became the first historically Black institution to win a collegiate basketball national championship. In 1959, Southern University became the first HBCU to win the NAIA Baseball championship.

=== Transgender participation ===
In 2024, the NAIA instituted a ban on transgender men who have begun transgender hormone therapy and all transgender women from competing in women's sports, with the exception of cheerleading and dance.

=== Female participation ===
The NAIA began sponsoring intercollegiate championships for women in 1980, the second coed national athletics association to do so, offering collegiate athletics championships to women in basketball, cross country, gymnastics, indoor and outdoor track and field, softball, swimming and diving, tennis and volleyball. The National Junior College Athletic Association had established a women's division in the spring of 1975 and held the first women's national championship volleyball tournament that fall.

In 1997, Liz Heaston became the first female college athlete to play and score in a college football game when she kicked two extra points during the 1997 Linfield vs. Willamette football game.

=== Champions of Character ===
Launched in 2000 by the NAIA, the Champions of Character program promotes character and sportsmanship through athletics. The Champions of Character conducts clinics and has developed an online training course to educate athletes, coaches, and athletic administrators with the skills necessary to promote character development in the context of sport.

=== Eligibility Center ===
In 2010, the association opened the NAIA Eligibility Center, where prospective student-athletes are evaluated for academic and athletic eligibility.

=== Other firsts ===
Membership – The NAIA was the first association to admit colleges and universities from outside the United States. The NAIA began admitting Canadian members in 1967.

Football – The NAIA was the first association to send a football team to Europe to play. In the summer of 1976, the NAIA sent Henderson State and Texas A&I to play 5 exhibition games in West Berlin, Vienna, Nuremberg, Mannheim and Paris.

Flag football – In May 2020, the NAIA, in partnership with the National Football League (NFL), announced the addition of flag football as a varsity sport for female student-athletes. The NAIA became the first collegiate governing body to sanction the sport at the varsity level. Women's flag began during the 2021 season as an emerging sport with about 15 teams.

Name, image, and likeness reform — In October 2020, the NAIA passed legislation that allows student-athletes at its member institutions to be compensated for the use of their name, image, and likeness (NIL). According to an NAIA press release, student-athletes can now "receive compensation for promoting any commercial product, enterprise, or for any public or media appearance", and can also "reference their intercollegiate athletic participation in such promotions or appearances." The NAIA had allowed student-athletes to receive NIL compensation since 2014, but had not previously allowed them to reference their status as such. The NAIA was several years ahead of the NCAA in NIL reform; the NCAA did not adopt NIL reform until 2021, after its hand was forced by multiple states passing legislation to allow student-athletes to receive such compensation, most notably California. In December 2020, Chloe Mitchell, a volleyball player at NAIA member Aquinas College who at the time had more than 2 million followers on TikTok with a series of do-it-yourself home improvement videos, became the first college student-athlete known to have profited from an endorsement under the current rules.

== Championship sports ==
The NAIA sponsors 16 sports in which it conducts 28 annual championships (13 for men, 13 for women, 2 co-ed). The NAIA recognizes three levels of competitions: "emerging" (15 or more institutions sponsoring as varsity and declared), "invitational" (25 or more institutions sponsoring as varsity and declared for postseason, Approval of the National Administrative Council), and "championship" (40 or more institutions sponsoring as varsity, Minimum of two Invitationals held, Approval of the National Administrative Council). The association conducts, or has conducted in the past, championship tournaments in the following sports (year established).

=== Basketball championships ===
- Men's basketball
  - Division I (1937–present)
  - Division II (1992–2020)
- Women's basketball
  - Division I (1981–present)
  - Division II (1992–2020)

The NAIA men's basketball championship is the longest-running collegiate national championship of any sport in the United States. The tournament was the brainchild of Dr. James Naismith, creator of the game of basketball; Emil Liston, athletic director at Baker University; and Frank Cramer, founder of Cramer Athletic Products.

The event began in 1937 with the inaugural tournament at Municipal Auditorium in Kansas City, Missouri. The 2017 men's championship marked the 80th edition of what has been tabbed College Basketball's Toughest Tournament. The tournament has awarded the Chuck Taylor Most Valuable Player award since 1939, as well as the Charles Stevenson Hustle Award ("Charlie Hustle"), which was the basis for Pete Rose's nickname, given to him by Whitey Ford. From 1992 to 2020, basketball was the only NAIA sport in which the organization's member institutions were aligned into divisions.

Effective with the 2020–21 academic year, the NAIA returned to a single division for both men's and women's basketball.

=== Other championship sports ===
- Baseball (1957)
- Bowling
  - Men's (2020; also 1962-78)
  - Women's (2020)
- Competitive Cheer (2017)
- Competitive Dance (2017)
- Cross Country
  - Men's (1956)
  - Women's (1980)
- Football
  - Division I (1956–present)
  - Division II (1970–1996)
- Lacrosse
  - Men's (2016)
  - Women's (2016)
- Golf
  - Men's (1952)
  - Women's (1995)
- Soccer
  - Men's (1959)
  - Women's (1984)
- Softball (1981)
- Swimming and Diving
  - Men's (1957)
  - Women's (1981)
- Tennis
  - Men's (1952)
  - Women's (1981)
- Indoor and Outdoor Track
  - Men's Indoor (1966)
  - Men's Outdoor (1952)
  - Women's Indoor (1981)
  - Women's Outdoor (1981)
- Volleyball
  - Men's (original run 1969–1980)/(2019)
  - Women's (1980)
- Wrestling
  - Men's (1958)
  - Women's (2019)

=== Invitational sports ===
- Beach volleyball

=== Emerging sports ===
- Women's flag football

=== Discontinued championships ===
- Gymnastics
  - Men's (1964–1985)
  - Women's (1981–1988)
- Ice hockey (1968–1984)
- Water polo

== Conferences ==
The NAIA has 20 member conferences, including nine that sponsor football. Member institutions that are not a part of any of these conferences play in the Continental Athletic Conference, formerly the Association of Independent Institutions.

=== List of conferences ===
- American Midwest Conference (AMC)
- Appalachian Athletic Conference (AAC) *
- California Pacific Conference (Cal Pac)
- Cascade Collegiate Conference (CCC)
- Chicagoland Collegiate Athletic Conference (CCAC)
- Continental Athletic Conference (CAC)
- Crossroads League (CL)
- Frontier Conference (Frontier) *
- Great Plains Athletic Conference (GPAC) *
- Great Southwest Athletic Conference (GSAC)
- HBCU Athletic Conference (HBCUAC)
- Heart of America Athletic Conference (HAAC) *
- Kansas Collegiate Athletic Conference (KCAC) *
- Mid-South Conference (MSC) *
- Mid-States Football Association (MSFA) †
- Red River Athletic Conference (RRAC)
- River States Conference (RSC)
- Sooner Athletic Conference (SAC) *
- Southern States Athletic Conference (SSAC)
- Sun Conference (TSC) *
- Wolverine–Hoosier Athletic Conference (WHAC)

*- Denotes that the conference sponsors football.

†- Denotes a football-only conference.

== See also ==
- List of NAIA conferences
- List of NAIA institutions
- List of NAIA regions
- List of college athletic programs by U.S. state
- NACDA Directors' Cup
