= Savannah College of Art and Design Bees =

Coordinates: 32.0730°N 81.0961°W

SCAD Bees
- University: Savannah College of Art and Design (Savannah campus)
- Nickname: Bees
- Association: NAIA
- Conference: The Sun (primary)
- Athletic director: Amanda Workman Haverstick
- Location: Savannah, Georgia
- First season: 1987
- Varsity teams: 19 (8 men's, 8 women's, 3 co-ed)
- Soccer stadium: SCAD Athletics Complex
- Aquatics center: Chatham County Aquatic Center
- Lacrosse stadium: Daffin Park
- Colors: Yellow and Black
- Website: savannah.scadathletics.com

The Savannah College of Art and Design Bees (or SCAD Savannah Bees or Savannah College of Art and Design Savannah Bees) are the athletic teams that represent the Savannah campus of the Savannah College of Art and Design (SCAD Savannah), located in Savannah, Georgia, in intercollegiate sports as a member of the National Association of Intercollegiate Athletics (NAIA), primarily competing in the Sun Conference (formerly known as the Florida Sun Conference (FSC) until after the 2007–08 school year) since the 2004–05 academic year; The Bees previously competed as an NAIA Independent during the 2003–04 school year (which they were a member on a previous stint from 1987–88 (when the school began intercollegiate athletics) to 1991–92); as well as a member of the Division III ranks of the National Collegiate Athletic Association (NCAA) as an NCAA D-III Independent from 1992–93 to 2002–03.

As a college of Art and Design, the school offers a sports lineup unlike most colleges. Its Savannah location is one of the few colleges in the United States to offer a competitive equestrian program. SCAD Savannah previously sponsored basketball, but dropped the sport after the 2008–09 season.

== Varsity teams ==
SCAD Savannah competes in 22 intercollegiate varsity sports.

Men's sports	Women's sports
Bowling	Bowling
Cross country	Cross country
Golf	Golf
Lacrosse	Lacrosse
Soccer	Soccer
Swimming	Swimming
Tennis	Tennis
Track and field	Track and field
Co-ed sports
Cycling
Equestrian
eSports

== National championships ==
Sport	Titles	Assoc.	Competition	Year	Rival	Score	Ref.
Soccer (women's)	1	NAIA	National championship	2024	Keiser	4–1	

=== Swimming ===
In 2016, the SCAD Savannah women won six individual national championships and 9 out of the 20 events, to win the team national championship in swimming, while the men placed second. This is the team's third national championship in women's swimming. The Bees’ Joel Ax was named the NAIA male swimmer of the meet and the NAIA male swimmer of the year, while coach Pilczuk was honored as the NAIA women’s swimming coach of the year.

== Facilities ==
Equestrian competitions are held at the 100-acre Ronald C. Waranch Equestrian center, a facility complete with rinks, paddocks, and grazing facilities. Golf is hosted at the Wilmington Island Club in Bluefield. Soccer and Lacrosse are housed at the SCAD athletics complex, which opened in August 2007. Swimming events are held at the Chatham County Aquatic Center, while tennis competitions are at Bacon Park.
