= Wartburg Knights men's basketball =

American college basketball team in Waverly, Iowa

- Head coach: Sam Leal (1st season)
- Location: Waverly, Iowa
- Arena: Levick Arena (capacity: 2,000)
- Conference: ARC
- Nickname: Knights
- Colors: Orange and Black

NCAA Division I tournament Elite Eight
- 1987
Other NCAA Division I tournament results
Sweet Sixteen	1975, 1987, 1989, 1991, 2017
Appearances	1975, 1987, 1989, 1991, 1993, 2001, 2017

Conference tournament champions
- 2001, 2017

Conference regular-season champions
- 1952, 1955, 1959, 1960, 1967, 1968, 1969, 1970, 1971, 1972, 1973, 1974, 1975, 1983, 1987, 1989, 1991, 1993, 2001, 2005, 2006

Uniforms
Home	Away

The Wartburg Knights men's basketball team represents the Wartburg College in Waverly, Iowa, United States. The team is a member of the American Rivers Conference as well as the National Collegiate Athletic Association. The team plays its regular season games in Levick Arena, along with women's basketball, wrestling, and volleyball teams.

== History ==
Wartburg men's basketball began in 1935, under head coach Elmer Hertel. The first Wartburg team finished 12–3 in 1935–36, its first victory was a 33–24 win against Lenox College. Hertel coached the first 3 seasons in the programs history. Since Hertel, Wartburg has had a total of 13 head coaches, the majority of the seasons coached by Buzz Levick and Dick Peth. Interestingly, Wartburg College would once compete against the Waterloo Hawks of the National Basketball Association on November 22, 1949, with Waterloo crushing them through a 72–35 final score at Wartburg's own venue.

=== Lewis "Buzz" Levick era (1965-1993) ===
Buzz Levick was named the head coach in 1965 and would go on to coach 28 seasons for the Knights. During his tenure he would led the Knights to 14 IIAC regular season titles, 9 of which would come in a row from 1967 to 1975. Following his retirement, the colleges new arena, built in 2008, would be named in his honor, Levick Arena.

=== Dick Peth era (1997-2024) ===
Dick Peth took over the Wartburg men's basketball program in 1997. During his tenure at Wartburg he has led them to three regular season Iowa Intercollegiate Athletic Conference championships, including back to back in 2005 and 2006. In 2017 his Wartburg Knight basketball team shocked the conference by winning the IIAC tournament as the tournament's 6th seed. They would go on to reach the NCAA Sweet Sixteen, upsetting #10 Benedictine College and #4 UW-River Falls in the first and second rounds. In December 2021, Peth entered the 600 win club following Wartburg's 82–70 win against University of Wisconsin–Eau Claire. In April 2024, Peth announced his retirement after 27 seasons at the helm.

=== Sam Leal era (2024-present) ===
Sam Leal was announced as the 13th head men's basketball coach in Wartburg history on May 1, 2024.

== NCAA tournament results ==
Wartburg has appeared in 7 NCAA Tournaments with a record of 7–8.

Year	Rank	Round	Opponent	Result
1975		First Round; Sweet Sixteen	Coe; Augustana (Ill)	W 79–78; L 61−62
1987		First Round; Sweet Sixteen; Elite Eight	Claremont-Mudd-Scripps; Gustavus Adolphus; North Park	W 91–81; W 74–72; L 63–88
1989		First Round; Sweet Sixteen; Regional Third Place	Gustavus Adolphus; Nebraska Wesleyan; Pomona-Pitzer	W 78–62; L 63–87; L 67–80
1991		First Round; Second Round; Sweet Sixteen	Bye; Central (IA); Calvin	- W 75–73; L 57–61
1993		First Round	St John's (MN)	L 75-80(OT)
2001	13	First Round; Second Round	Bye; Illinois Wesleyan	- L 60–65
2017		First Round; Second Round; Sweet Sixteen	#10 Benedictine(ILL) #4 UW-River Falls; Augustana (Ill)	W 92–66; W 76–43; L 69–80

== Head coaching records ==
Record table
Season	Coach	Overall	Conference	Standing	Postseason
Wartburg Knights (no conference) (1935–1936)
1935–1936	Elmer Hertel	12-3			
Wartburg Knights (Iowa Intercollegiate Athletic Conference) (1935–2018)
1936–1937	Elmer Hertel	8-5			
1937–1938	Elmer Hertel	8-7			
Elmer Hertel:		28-15			
1938–1939	Ralph McKinzie	3-11			
1939–1940	Ralph McKinzie	1-13			
Ralph McKinzie:		4-24			
1940–1941	C.C. Van Dyke	3-12			
1941–1942	C.C. Van Dyke	1-13			
1942–1943	C.C. Van Dyke	5-8			
C.C. Van Dyke:		9-33			
1943–1944	Elmer Hertel	8-8			
1944–1945	Elmer Hertel	11-8			
Elmer Hertel:		47-30			
1945–1946	William Roselius	5-15			
William Roselius:		5-15			
1946–1947	Stanley Hall	8-9			
Stanley Hall:		8-9			
1947–1948	Axel Bundgaard	6-11			
1948–1949	Axel Bundgaard	8-11			
1949–1950	Axel Bundgaard	8-13			
1950–1951	Axel Bundgaard	13-9			
1951–1952	Axel Bundgaard	17-7		1st	
1952–1953	Axel Bundgaard	14-8			
1953–1954	Axel Bundgaard	15-8			
1954–1955	Axel Bundgaard	17-9		1st	
Axel Bundgaard:		98-76			
1955–1956	Earnest Opperman	17-8			
Earnest Opperman:		17-8			
1956–1957	Axel Bundgaard	19-8			
1957–1958	Axel Bundgaard	16-9			
1958–1959	Axel Bundgaard	21-5		1st	
1959–1960	Axel Bundgaard	18-7		1st	
1960–1961	Axel Bundgaard	15-9			
Axel Bundgaard:		187-114			
1961–1962	Fred Jaspers	6-18			
1962–1963	Fred Jaspers	13-12			
1963–1964	Fred Jaspers	11-12			
1964–1965	Fred Jaspers	12-10			
Fred Jaspers:		42-52			
1965–1966	Buzz Levick	12-10	10-6		
1966–1967	Buzz Levick	19-7	10-4	1st	NAIA First Round
1967–1968	Buzz Levick	22-3	15-1	1st	
1968–1969	Buzz Levick	25-1	15-0	1st	NAIA First Round
1969–1970	Buzz Levick	26-3	13-2	1st	NAIA Sweet Sixteen
1970–1971	Buzz Levick	19-8	12-4	1st	
1971–1972	Buzz Levick	18-5	13-2	1st	
1972–1973	Buzz Levick	21-8	13-2	1st	NAIA First Round
1973–1974	Buzz Levick	23-5	14-2	1st	NAIA First Round
1974–1975	Buzz Levick	22-6	12-2	1st	NCAA Sweet Sixteen
1975–1976	Buzz Levick	13-13	7-7		
1976–1977	Buzz Levick	19-6	10-4		
1977–1978	Buzz Levick	19-7	10-4		
1978–1979	Buzz Levick	10-14	4-11		
1979–1980	Buzz Levick	18-8	9-5		
1980–1981	Buzz Levick	14-12	8-6		
1981–1982	Buzz Levick	16-9	9-5		
1982–1983	Buzz Levick	21-5	10-4	1st	
1983–1984	Buzz Levick	14-15	10-5		
1984–1985	Buzz Levick	12-14	6-8		
1985–1986	Buzz Levick	17-9	9-6		
1986–1987	Buzz Levick	19-9	12-4	1st	NCAA Elite Eight
1987–1988	Buzz Levick	15-11	8-8		
1988–1989	Buzz Levick	21-8	13-3	1st	NCAA Sweet Sixteen
1989–1990	Buzz Levick	17-9	12-5		
1990–1991	Buzz Levick	23-5	13-3	1st	NCAA Sweet Sixteen
1991–1992	Buzz Levick	15-10	8-9		
1992–1993	Buzz Levick	18-8	13-4	1st	First Round
Buzz Levick:		527-236			
1993–1994	Howard Gauthier	14-11	8-8		
1994–1995	Howard Gauthier	13-11	10-7		
1995–1996	Howard Gauthier	12–13	8-9		
Howard Gauthier:		39-35			
1996–1997	Marty Simmons	10-14	7-9	T-7th	
Marty Simmons:		10-14			
1997–1998	Dick Peth	16-9	13-7		
1998–1999	Dick Peth	13-12	11-10		
1999–2000	Dick Peth	12-12	10-10		
2000–2001	Dick Peth	24-4	17-1	1st	NCAA Second Round
2001–2002	Dick Peth	20-8	14-4	2nd	
2002–2003	Dick Peth	21-7	14-4	2nd	
2003–2004	Dick Peth	20-8	11-5	T–2nd	
2004–2005	Dick Peth	23–5	15-1	1st	
2005–06	Dick Peth	19-6	12-4	1st	
2006–07	Dick Peth	11-15	5-11	6th	
2007–2008	Dick Peth	9-16	6-10	7th	
2008–09	Dick Peth	15-13	8-8	4th	
2009–10	Dick Peth	15-12	8–8	6th	
2010–11	Dick Peth	10-14	5-11	8th	
2011–12	Dick Peth	11-14	5-11	7th	
2012–13	Dick Peth	15-12	8–6	4th	
2013–14	Dick Peth	13-13	7-7	T–5th	
2014–15	Dick Peth	15-13	6-8	5th	
2015–16	Dick Peth	16-11	8-6	T-2nd	
2016–17	Dick Peth	21-10	8–8	T–5th	NCAA Sweet Sixteen
2017–18	Dick Peth	17-10	9-7	T-4th	
Wartburg Knights (American Rivers Conference) (2018–Present)
2018–19	Dick Peth	17-9	11-5	3rd	
2019–20	Dick Peth	12-15	7-9	T-5th	
2020–21	Dick Peth	4-7	2-4	7th	Postseason not held due to COVID-19
2021–22	Dick Peth	16–10	9–7	T–4th	
2022–23	Dick Peth	11–15	8–8	5th	
2023–24	Dick Peth	3–22	2–14	T–8th	
Dick Peth:		401–302			
2024–2025	Sam Leal	16-11	8-8	T-5th	
Sam Leal:		16-11	8-8		
Total:					
National champion Postseason invitational champion Conference regular season champion Conference regular season and conference tournament champion Division regular season champion Division regular season and conference tournament champion Conference tournament champion

== Current coaching staff ==
- Head coach: Sam Leal
- Assistant coach: Kade Terrell
- S&C coach: Ethan Hayes
- Athletic trainer: Danny Drees

== Head coaching history ==
As of the completion of 2024 season

Tenure	Coach	Years	Record	Pct.
1935–1938; 1943-1945	Elmer Hertel	5	47–30	.610
1938–1939	Ralph McKinzie	2	4–24	.143
1940–1943	C.C. Van Dyke	3	9–33	.214
1945–1946	William Roselius	1	5–15	.250
1946–1947	Stanley Hall	1	8–9	.471
1947–1955; 1956-1961	Axel Bundgaard	13	187–114	.621
1955–1956	Earnest Opperman	1	17–8	.680
1961–1965	Fred Jaspers	4	42–52	.447
1965–1993	Lewis "Buzz" Levick	29	527–236	.691
1993–1996	Howard Gauthier	3	39–35	.527
1996–1997	Marty Simmons	1	10–14	.527
1997–2024	Dick Peth	27	401–302	.570
2024–Present	Sam Leal	1	16-11	.593
Totals	13 coaches			–

† Kathy Franken served as the interim head coach for the end of the 2005–2006 season following the departure of Monica Severson.

== Individual awards ==
=== Conference Awards ===
Conference Awards
Year	Player	Type
1969-70	GE Buenning	Most Valuable Player
1971-72	Dave Platte	Most Valuable Player
1974-75	Bud Johnson	Most Valuable Player
1988-89	Mike Murphy	Most Valuable Player
1992-93	Matt Leary	Most Valuable Player
2000-01	Troy Osterhaus	Most Valuable Player
2004-05	Nate Schmidt	Most Valuable Player
