= Wartburg Knights women's volleyball =

American college volleyball team

- Founded: 1975; 51 years ago
- Head coach: DeAnn Akins (1st season)
- Conference: ARC
- Location: Waverly, Iowa
- Home arena: Levick Arena (capacity: 2,000)
- Nickname: Knights
- Colors: Orange and Black

AIAW/NCAA tournament appearance
- 1997, 1998, 2001, 2002, 2003, 2010, 2012, 2013, 2015, 2016, 2017, 2021

Conference tournament champion
- 2002, 2003, 2010, 2012, 2013, 2015, 2016, 2017, 2021

Conference regular season champion
- 2002, 2012, 2013, 2015, 2016, 2017, 2018, 2019, 2020(spring 2021), 2021

The Wartburg Knights women's volleyball team represents Wartburg College and competes in the American Rivers Conference of NCAA Division III. The team is coached by DeAnn Akins. The Knights play their home matches in Levick Arena along with wrestling and the men's and women's basketball teams.

== History ==
The Knights began volleyball in 1975 under head coach Elizabeth Halsteen. That season ended with an 8–6 record. It would take Wartburg 27 years to win their first Iowa Conference title 2002. The Knights have achieved a high level of success from 2012 to 2021, winning 9 of the 10 conference titles, 7 of them coming consecutively. In 2017 the Knights would win their 3rd straight conference championship and 3rd straight NCAA tournament, tying their longest prior streak. The 2020 volleyball season was moved to the spring of 2021 due to the COVID-19 pandemic, Wartburg won the conference title that season in a shortened conference only schedule. In 2021 they achieved one of their best seasons in school history, completing the regular season undefeated. They would host the NCAA regional for the first time and make it to the Sweet Sixteen for only the second time in program history. The Knights would go on to drop the regional final to #3 Claremont-Mudd-Scripps in 5 sets, finishing the year 29–1.

== Record ==
Record
Iowa Intercollegiate Athletic Conference (1975–2018)
Year	Head Coach	Overall Record	Conference Record	Conference Standing	Postseason
1975	Elizabeth Halsteen	8–6	–	–	–
1976	Cheryl Wren	7–6	–	–	–
1977	Cheryl Wren	3–13	–	–	–
1978	Nancy Schley	3–16	–	–	–
1979	Nancy Schley	4-24	–	–	–
1980	Nancy Schley	8–17	–	–	–
1981	Kathy Meyer	14–23	–	–	–
1982	Kathy Meyer	12–16	–	–	–
1983	Kathy Meyer	10–15	–	–	–
1984	Kathy Meyer	4–16	–	–	–
1985	Kathy Meyer	9–19	–	–	–
1986	Kathy Meyer	20–15	–	–	–
1987	Janet Vaughn	24–11	–	–	–
1988	Janet Vaughn	21–10	–	–	–
1989	Janet Vaughn	25–10	–	–	–
1990	Robin Baker Hoppenworth	20–12	–	–	–
1991	Robin Baker Hoppenworth	20–16	–	–	–
1992	Robin Baker Hoppenworth	21–16	–	–	–
1993	Robin Baker Hoppenworth	10–22	2–6	–	–
1994	Robin Baker Hoppenworth	19–22	3–5	–	–
1995	Robin Baker Hoppenworth	23–15	5–3	–	–
1996	Robin Baker Hoppenworth	24–9	8–1	2nd	–
1997	Robin Baker Hoppenworth	24–9	8–2	3rd	NCAA Regional Semifinal
1998	Jennifer Walker	26–4	8–1	2nd	NCAA Regional
1999	Jennifer Walker	15–17	6–4	–	–
2000	Jennifer Walker	29–5	8–1	2nd	–
2001	Jennifer Walker	28–8	7–2	T-3rd	NCAA Regional
2002	Jennifer Walker	30–10	8–1	1st	NCAA Regional Semifinal
2003	Jennifer Walker	30–11	5–3	T-3rd	NCAA Regional Final
2004	Jennifer Walker	18–19	5–3	T-2nd	–
2005	Jennifer Walker	20–14	7–1	2nd	–
2006	Jennifer Walker	17–19	5–3	T-3rd	–
2007	Jennifer Walker	17–18	6–2	T-2nd	–
2008	Jennifer Walker	11–24	4-4	T-4th	–
2009	Jennifer Walker	18–17	6–2	T-2nd	–
2010	Jennifer Walker	24–16	5–3	T-4th	–
2011	Jennifer Walker	24–11	7–1	2nd	–
2012	Jennifer Walker	32–6	7–0	1st	NCAA Regional
2013	Jennifer Walker; Doug Frazell	26–12	7–0	1st	NCAA Regional
2014	Jennifer Walker; Doug Frazell	23–11	5–2	T-2nd	–
2015	Jennifer Walker; Doug Frazell	31–6	6–1	1st	NCAA Regional Semifinal
2016	Jennifer Walker; Doug Frazell	19–8	7–1	1st	NCAA Regional
2017	Jennifer Walker; Doug Frazell	25–6	8–0	1st	NCAA Regional Semifinal
American Rivers Conference (2018–Present)
2018	Jennifer Walker; Doug Frazell	18–12	7–1	1st	–
2019	Jennifer Walker; Doug Frazell	24–8	8–0	1st	–
2020	Jennifer Walker; Doug Frazell	7–2	7–1	1st	No Postseason held
2021	Jennifer Walker; Doug Frazell	29–1	8–0	1st	NCAA Regional Final
2022	Jennifer Walker; Doug Frazell	15–11	7–1	2nd	–
2023	Jennifer Walker; Doug Frazell	11–19	3–5	T–6th	–
2024	Jennifer Walker; Doug Frazell	18–12	5–3	T–3rd	–
2025	DeAnn Akins	15–12	4–4	T–5th	–
Total	9	936–650	–	–	8–11

== Current coaching staff ==
- Head coach: DeAnn Akins
- Assistant Coach: Jen Walker
- Athletic trainer: Kenzie Nuss

== Individual awards ==
=== All-Americans ===
All-Americans
Year	Player	Type
2003	Dia Dohlman; Amy Kueker	Second Team; Honorable Mention
2005	Ashley Rogers	Honorable Mention
2006	Ashley Rogers	Honorable Mention
2007	Ashley Rogers	First Team
2011	Ramey Sieck; Britlyn Sieck	Second Team; Honorable Mention
2013	Ramey Sieck; Bailey Wilson	Honerable Mention; Honorable Mention
2014	Bailey Wilson	Honorable Mention
2016	Aryn Jones	Honorable Mention
2017	Aryn Jones	Third Team
2019	Katie Foster	Honorable Mention
2021	Katie Foster; Kylie Bildstein; Claire Marsh	First Team; Second Team; Honorable Mention
2022	Allison Feigenbaum	Honorable Mention
2024	Emerson Kracht	Honorable Mention

=== Conference Awards ===
Conference Awards
Year	Player	Type
1990	Kim Kelly	Most Valuable Player
2007	Ashley Rogers	Most Valuable Player
2012	Ramey Sieck	Most Valuable Player
2013	Ramey Sieck	Most Valuable Player
2014	Bailey Wilson	Most Valuable Player
2016	Aryn Jones	Most Valuable Player
2017	Aryn Jones; Katie Foster	Most Valuable Player; Freshman of the Year
2019	Katie Foster	Most Valuable Player & Defensive Player of the Year
2020	Katie Foster	Defensive Player of the Year
2021	Kylie Bildstein; Katie Foster	Most Valuable Player; Defensive Player of the Year
