= Landon Williams =

Wrestling coach

Current position
- Title: Head coach
- Team: Central (IA)
- Conference: ARC
- Record: 23–9 (.719)

Biographical details
- Born: Eldridge, IA
- Education: Wartburg

Playing career

Wrestling
- 2011-2014: Wartburg

Coaching career (HC unless noted)
- 2014-2015: Wartburg (asst.)
- 2015-2019: Holy Cross HS (LA)
- 2019-2024: Wartburg (asst.)
- 2024-Present: Central (IA)

Head coaching record
- Overall: 23–9 (.719)

Accomplishments and honors

Championships
- As wrestler: 4x NCAA Team National Champion (2011, 2012, 2013, 2014); 2012 NCAA 165 lb. National Champion; 2014 NCAA 174 lb. National Champion; As assistant coach: 2022 NCAA Team National Champion; 3x NCAA Team National Runner-up(2015, 2023, 2024)

Landon Williams is a collegiate wrestling coach, currently at Central College (Iowa) in Pella, Iowa. Williams was announced as Central's head men's wrestling coach in April 2024 following 5 years as an assistant at his alma mater, Wartburg.

== Wrestling career ==
=== High School ===
Williams went to high school in Davenport, Iowa at Davenport Assumption high school where he was member of the wrestling team. In his senior season he would finish with an undefeated season at 47-0 and a state championship at 160lbs.

=== College ===
Landon was a 4-year member of the Wartburg Knights wrestling program. During his time at Wartburg he won 4 team national titles and two individual titles. In 2012, his sophomore campaign, he won his first NCAA national title at 165 lbs. with a win over Coe College's Nick LeClere. In his final season as a Knight, Williams capped off the year with a pin in the 174 lbs. national final against Anthony Bonaventura of Waynesburg to secure his second national title. He finished his career with 135–15 record and as a 2x team captain, 2x NCAA champion, 3x NCAA all-American, and 4x NCAA team champion.

== Collegiate coaching career ==
=== Wartburg ===
Williams began his coaching career at Wartburg College following his graduation in 2014 for one season. Then after a stint coaching high school wrestling at Holy Cross in Louisiana, Williams would return to Wartburg in 2019 to coach under head coach Eric Keller. During his time at Wartburg, Williams would help the Knights return to the top of the NCAA wrestling world by winning the 2022 NCAA team title, the programs first since 2018. In his final two seasons at Wartburg the program would finish as back to back National Runner-ups. In his coaching career at Wartburg, Williams was a part of the 2022 NCAA team national championships, 3 NCAA team national runner-ups(2015, 2023–2024), and helped coach 6 individual national champions and 42 all-Americans.

=== Central ===
On April 8, 2024, Landon Williams was named the head men's wrestling coach at Central College (IA). Williams is the 11th head coach in program history.

== Coaching results ==
Head coaching results
Season	Dual Record	Conference record	Conference Finish	NCAA Finish	All Americans	National Champions
Central (IA)
2024–25	11–4	6–2	T– (silver)	35th	1	0
2025–26	12–5	6–2	3rd place, bronze medalist(s)	10th	2	1
Central Totals:	23–9	12–4			3	1
Career Totals:	23–9	12–4			3	1
