= Georg M. Grossmann =

Georg Martin Grossman
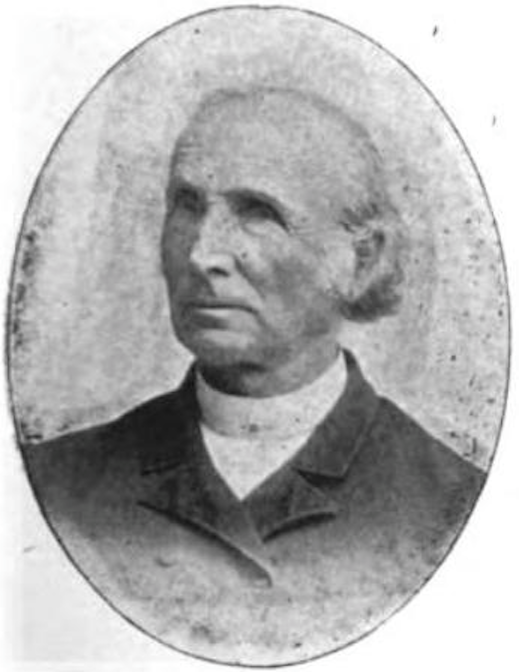
- Portrait of Herr Inspektor Georg Martin Großmann
- Born: 18 October 1823; Groß-Bieberau, Grand Duchy of Hesse
- Died: 7 August 1897 (aged 73); Waverly, Iowa
- Education: University of Erlangen
- Spouse: Nannie Steppes
- Children: Eight children
- Religion: Lutheran
- Ordained: 1852

Inspector (German: Herr Inspektor) Georg Martin Grossman (18 October 1823 in Groß-Bieberau, Grand Duchy of Hesse - 24 August 1897 in Waverly, Iowa) was a German-American Lutheran pastor, academic, missionary, and church leader who founded the Iowa Synod, Wartburg College, and Wartburg Theological Seminary.

== Background in Germany ==
Georg Martin Grossmann was born in Groß-Bieberau, a town in the Grand Duchy of Hesse, Germany to the teacher Ludwig Großmann and his wife Maria Margaretha née Rotenhaeuser. He initially studied in Friedberg in order to become a teacher like his father and was a teacher in Friedberg, Rodheim (near Rosbach vor der Höhe), and Lollar.

Grossman became strongly influenced by the mission-minded pastor Johann Konrad Wilhelm Löhe of Neuendettelsau, Bavaria, and then began a study of theology at Erlangen and later at Nürnberg. Grossman was convinced he should use his teaching skills in the mission field of the United States and emigrated in 1852 under Löhe's sponsorship. While en route, he was ordained a Lutheran pastor and boarded his ship in Hamburg as the ship chaplain.

== Career in the US ==
=== Michigan ===
Grossmann arrived with his family in Saginaw, Michigan, in July 1852. He rented a storefront in Saginaw to house a school that enrolled five students and would eventually become Wartburg Theological Seminary, the first German-Lutheran teacher training seminary in North America. Grossmann would serve as the president of the seminary from 1852 to 1868 and again from 1878 to 1894.

Their stay in Saginaw was short-lived however as Grossmann found himself caught up in old arguments that had been developing between the Buffalo Synod and the Missouri Synod about ecclesiology. Löhe had been trying to mediate between the two synods, which ended up causing both sides to mistrust Löhe. Due to Grossmann's loyalty to Löhe, he soon became a target of mistrust as well and was even threatened with church discipline by his pastor, Ottomar Cloeter, at Holy Cross, who himself had been a missionary sent by Löhe.

At a conference in Saginaw, both Grossman and another Löhe missionary, Johannes Diendoerfer of the nearby Frankenhilf colony (today called Richville in Denmark Township), were made to understand that their views were creating divisions. Attempting first to move out of the nearby region, the Missouri Synod asserted that in states where it had congregations, no other Lutherans had a right to do missionary work. Finally, Deindoerfer and Grossmann acquired Löhe's approval to separate from the Missouri Synod when Grossmann's seminary was threatened with dissolution as a schismatic institution if it was not handed over to that synod.

In July and August 1853, Deindoerfer took an exploratory trip with Frankenhilf colonist Gottlob Amman to Iowa. In September of that year, Grossmann, with about 20 other people, moved from Michigan to Iowa to reestablish the teacher-training seminary and establish a new synod apart from the Missouri Synod.

=== Iowa ===
Grossmann rented a brick building on Garfield Avenue in Dubuque, Iowa, and reopened his seminary. At this time he began to make connections with the various German-Lutheran immigrants in the area. Deindoerfer moved to Clayton County with some of the colonists from Michigan and they established the St. Sebald colony there (named after the patron saint of Nürnberg).

On August 24, 1854, Grossmann met with Deindoerfer at his log cabin in St. Sebald along with professor Sigmund Fitschel from Nürnberg and Micheal Schüller (who was ordained at the meeting). Together these four established the Evangelical Lutheran Synod of Iowa. Grossmann served as president of the Iowa Synod from 1854 through 1893.

Grossmann established synod headquarters in Dubuque and quickly backed the work of establishing congregations for the newly arriving German immigrants to Iowa. He was instrumental in the founding of St. John's Lutheran in Dubuque. Another early enterprise was in Sherrill, Iowa, where he purchased 80 acres (32 ha) of land with Bavarian immigrants Georg and Heinrich Vogel from Hof, Bavaria, in 1855 in order to establish a school and church. This became St. Matthew's Lutheran, where the original Wartburg Seminary bell sent by Löhe from Germany and first used in Saginaw has been housed since Easter 1869.

The cost of keeping the seminary going in Dubuque became prohibitive and in July 1857, Grossmann left Dubuque. He relocated the seminary to Clayton County, where the teachers and seminarians could more cost-effectively incorporate self-provision into their education. It was in the wooded areas of Clayton County that Grossmann named the seminary "Wartburg" because it reminded him of the area around the Wartburg castle in Germany where Martin Luther had been hidden during the early Reformation.

In 1878, Grossmann moved to Andrew, Iowa, to train teachers. The following year (1879) both he and the school moved to Waverly, Iowa. In 1885, this school was combined with Wartburg Seminary, which had been operated in Mendota, Illinois. Grossmann remained in Waverly as president of the seminary until his retirement due to health in 1894. He died in Waverly in 1897 and is buried there in Harlington Cemetery.

== Publications ==
In 1895 Grossmann published Die Christliche Gemeindeschule: Ein Kurzer Wegweiser für Anfänger im Schulamte (English: The Christian Community School: A short guide for beginners in school administration).

== Legacy ==
Today Wartburg College is a four-year liberal arts college of the Evangelical Lutheran Church in America. Grossmann Hall at Wartburg College is named in his memory. The Franklin I. and Irene List Saemann Foundation was founded by Grossmann's granddaughter, Irene List Saemann, to support Wartburg College.
