= WMKB =

WMKB may refer to:

- WMKB (FM), a radio station (102.9 FM) licensed to Earlville, Illinois, United States
- WMKB-LP, a defunct low-power television station (channel 25) formerly licensed to Rochelle, Illinois, United States
- the ICAO code for RMAF Butterworth Air Base
