= Evangelical Lutheran Synod of Iowa =

Defunct Christian denomination in the United States

- Abbreviation: Iowa Synod
- Classification: Protestant
- Orientation: Lutheran
- Theology: Confessional Lutheran
- Structure: National synod, middle level districts, and local congregations
- Associations: National Lutheran Council
- Region: United States
- Headquarters: Dubuque, Iowa
- Founder: Georg M. Grossmann
- Origin: August 24, 1854; St. Sebald, Iowa
- Absorbed: First Evangelical Lutheran Synod of Texas (1896)
- Merged into: American Lutheran Church (1930)
- Congregations: 932 (1929)
- Members: 150,683 (1929)
- Ministers: 637 (1929)

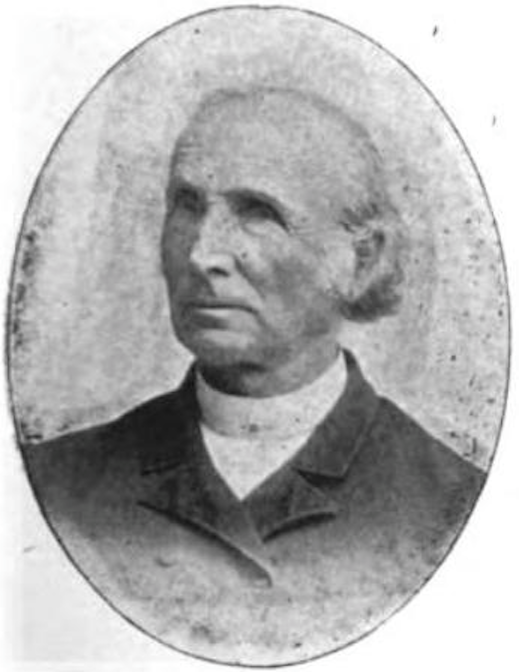
Portrait of Georg M. Grossmann

The Evangelical Lutheran Synod of Iowa and Other States, commonly known as the Iowa Synod, was founded on August 24, 1854, at St. Sebald in Clayton County, Iowa. It adopted a constitution and its name (German: Deutsche evangelisch-lutherische Synode von Iowa), in 1864. The synod was the result of disagreements in Saginaw, Michigan, with the Missouri Synod that had arisen with some of the pastors sent to America by Johann Konrad Wilhelm Löhe. Some of these pastors joined the Missouri Synod, while pastors Georg M. Grossmann and Johannes Deindoerfer and a small group moved to Iowa.

During the 1874 convention, the synod's flagship seminary, Wartburg Theological Seminary, was moved to Mendota, Illinois. Most of the congregations of the First Evangelical Lutheran Synod of Texas joined the Iowa Synod as its Texas District in 1896. In 1930, the Iowa Synod merged with the Ohio Synod and the Buffalo Synod to form the American Lutheran Church (ALC). The latter body, after further mergers, became part of the Evangelical Lutheran Church in America in 1988.

In 1929, just before its merger into the ALC, the Iowa Synod had 637 pastors, 932 congregations, and 150,683 members.
