= Marty Simmons =

American basketball player and coach

Current position
- Title: Head coach
- Team: Eastern Illinois
- Conference: OVC
- Record: 54–110 (.329)

Biographical details
- Born: February 21, 1965 (age 61); Lawrenceville, Illinois, U.S.

Playing career
- 1983–1985: Indiana
- 1986–1988: Evansville

Coaching career (HC unless noted)
- 1990–1996: Evansville (assistant)
- 1996–1997: Wartburg
- 1997–2002: Evansville (assistant)
- 2002–2007: SIU Edwardsville
- 2007–2018: Evansville
- 2018–2021: Clemson (asst. to the HC)
- 2021–present: Eastern Illinois

Head coaching record
- Overall: 336–358 (.484)
- Tournaments: 3–2 (NCAA Division II); 1–2 (CBI); 7–3 (CIT)

Accomplishments and honors

Championships
- CIT (2015); GLVC (2006)

Awards
- 2× First-team All-MCC (1987, 1988); Illinois Mr. Basketball (1983)

Martin Ray Simmons (born February 21, 1965) is an American basketball coach and former player. He is the head men's basketball coach at Eastern Illinois University, a position he has held since 2021. Simmons served as the head men's basketball coach at Wartburg College from 1996 to 1997, Southern Illinois University Edwardsville from 2002 to 2007, and the University of Evansville from 2007 to 2018. As a high school player, Simmons was named Illinois Mr. Basketball in 1983. He played college basketball at Indiana University Bloomington and Evansville.

== High school ==
Simmons was born and raised in Lawrenceville, Illinois, and attended Lawrenceville High School, graduating in 1983. While attending high school, Simmons led the Indians to consecutive 34–0 seasons and Illinois High School Association (IHSA) Class A state championships, becoming one of the most celebrated players in Illinois prep history. Because of Simmons' ability to "carry" his team the nickname of "Mule" was given to him during his junior year. His 2,986 career points were the third most in Illinois history when he graduated in 1983. Simmons played for coach Ron Felling, who went on to become an assistant coach at Indiana University.

In 2006, Simmons was voted as one of the 100 Legends of the IHSA Boys Basketball Tournament, a group of former players and coaches in honor of the 100th anniversary of the IHSA boys basketball tournament.

== College ==
After high school, Simmons spent his first two years of college playing for Bob Knight and the Indiana Hoosiers. During his freshman year, he was an integral part of the Hoosiers' Elite Eight run in the 1984 NCAA tournament. His 1985 team at Indiana finished second in the National Invitation Tournament (NIT). After Simmons' sophomore year, however, he transferred to the University of Evansville to play for former Indiana assistant coach Jim Crews. Crews made Simmons the team captain for the Purple Aces, even though he had to redshirt the 1985–86 season. When Simmons became eligible, he immediately helped turn around the Evansville program. During the 1986–87 season he averaged 22.4 points per game and led Evansville to a first place tie in the Midwestern Collegiate Conference. During his senior year, Simmons finished sixth in the nation in scoring at 25.9 points per game, and finished ninth in balloting for the Associated Press College Basketball Player of the Year. Evansville posted a 21–8 record in 1988 and recorded a first-round win over Utah in the NIT. Simmons was named to the first team all-MCC in both of his seasons at UE. Despite playing only two seasons at Evansville, Simmons ranks 22nd all-time with 1,265 points.

== Coaching career ==
After graduating from Evansville, Simmons played the 1988–89 season for the La Crosse Catbirds of the Continental Basketball Association. During the 1989–90 season, while playing for the Illinois Express, Simmons made the World Basketball League all-star team.

After being a part-time assistant coach for Evansville from 1990 to 1996, Simmons became the head coach at Wartburg College, an NCAA Division III school in Waverly, Iowa, for the 1996–97 season. Simmons returned to the University of Evansville the next season as a full-time assistant coach, and stayed at Evansville until becoming the head coach at Southern Illinois University Edwardsville in April 2002. In 2007, after five years of coaching while producing a record of 88–59 for the Cougars, Simmons once again returned to Evansville, this time as head coach. He coached the Aces for 11 seasons, compiling a record of 184–175 before being fired following the 2017–18 season. In July 2018, Simmons accepted an assistant coaching position under his longtime friend, Brad Brownell, for the Clemson Tigers. The two coached together at the University of Evansville from 1991 to 1992.

Simmons was hired by Eastern Illinois University on March 31, 2021, to take over as head coach for the men's basketball program.

== Honors ==
Simmons was inducted into the Illinois Basketball Coaches Association (IBCA) Hall of Fame in 1994, and the University of Evansville Athletics Hall of Fame in 1997. In 2007, Simmons was voted one of the 100 Legends of the IHSA Boys Basketball Tournament, recognizing his superior performance in his appearances in the tournament.

== Head coaching record ==
Record table
Season	Team	Overall	Conference	Standing	Postseason
Wartburg Knights (Iowa Intercollegiate Athletic Conference) (1996–1997)
1996–97	Wartburg	10–14	7–9	T–7th	
Wartburg:		10–14 (.417)	7–9 (.438)		
SIU Edwardsville Cougars (Great Lakes Valley Conference) (2002–2007)
2002–03	SIU Edwardsville	9–18	5–15	T–9th	
2003–04	SIU Edwardsville	16–12	11–9	T–5th	
2004–05	SIU Edwardsville	23–9	15–5	2nd	NCAA Division II first round
2005–06	SIU Edwardsville	25–8	14–5	T–1st (West)	NCAA Division II Elite Eight
2006–07	SIU Edwardsville	15–12	10–9	5th (West)	
SIU Edwardsville:		88–59 (.599)	55–43 (.561)		
Evansville Purple Aces (Missouri Valley Conference) (2007–2018)
2007–08	Evansville	9–21	3–15	10th	
2008–09	Evansville	17–14	8–10	T–5th	CIT first round
2009–10	Evansville	9–21	3–15	10th	
2010–11	Evansville	16–16	9–9	6th	CBI second round
2011–12	Evansville	16–16	9–9	T–3rd	CBI first round
2012–13	Evansville	21–15	10–8	4th	CIT semifinal
2013–14	Evansville	14–19	6–12	T–8th	
2014–15	Evansville	24–12	9–9	5th	CIT Champion
2015–16	Evansville	25–9	12–6	T–2nd	
2016–17	Evansville	16–17	6–12	8th	
2017–18	Evansville	17–15	7–11	T–7th	
Evansville:		184–175 (.513)	82–116 (.414)		
Eastern Illinois Panthers (Ohio Valley Conference) (2021–present)
2021–22	Eastern Illinois	5–26	3–15	10th	
2022–23	Eastern Illinois	9–22	5–13	10th	
2023–24	Eastern Illinois	14–18	8–10	7th	
2024–25	Eastern Illinois	12–19	8–12	9th	
2025–26	Eastern Illinois	13–20	8–12	T–8th	
2026–27	Eastern Illinois	1–5	0–0		
Eastern Illinois:		54–110 (.329)	32–62 (.340)		
Total:		336–358 (.484)			
National champion Postseason invitational champion Conference regular season champion Conference regular season and conference tournament champion Division regular season champion Division regular season and conference tournament champion Conference tournament champion

Awards and achievements
Preceded by Bruce Douglas	Illinois Mr. Basketball Award Winner; 1983	Succeeded by Brian Sloan
