= Abbylynn Helgevold =

American philosopher

Education
- Education: University of Iowa (PhD)
- Thesis: Humility, Oppression, and Human Flourishing: A Critical Appropriation of Aquinas on Humility (2013)
- Doctoral advisor: Diana Fritz Cates

Philosophical work
- Era: 21st-century philosophy
- Region: Western philosophy
- School: Analytic
- Institutions: Wartburg College (2020-), University of Northern Iowa (2012-2020)
- Main interests: ethical theory

Abbylynn Helgevold is an American philosopher and Board of Regents Distinguished Professor in Ethics at Wartburg College. Previously she was a professor at the University of Northern Iowa (2012-2020).
