= DeAnn Akins =

American volleyball coach

DeAnn Akins (Woodin)
Current position
- Title: Head coach
- Team: Wartburg
- Conference: American Rivers Conference
- Record: 15–12 (.556)

Biographical details
- Born: Waverly, Iowa, U.S.
- Education: UNI

Coaching career (HC unless noted)
- 2002: Wartburg (asst.)
- 2003–2004: Kirkwood C.C.
- 2005: Iowa (DOP)
- 2006–2024: Coe
- 2025–Present: Wartburg

Head coaching record
- Overall: 403–236 (.631) (NCAA); 81–25 (.764) (junior college)

Accomplishments and honors

Championships
- NJCAA Division II National Championship (2003); 5x IIAC/A-R-C (2011, 2014, 2020, 2022, 2024)

Awards
- 2003 AVCA Midwest Coach of the Year 2x NJCAA Division II District C Coach of the Year (2003, 2004 5x IIAC/A-R-C Coach of the Year (2006, 2011, 2020, 2022, 2024)

DeAnn Akins (née Woodin) is an American volleyball coach who is the head coach of the Wartburg women's college volleyball team.

== Early life ==
Woodin grew up in Waverly, Iowa and played volleyball at Waverly-Shell Rock high school for her mother, Eavon Woodin, the winningest volleyball coach in Iowa high school history. She would then go on to play Volleyball for the University of South Dakota before transferring to UNI where she would play for one season, then transition to student coach.

== Coaching career ==
=== Kirkwood Community College ===
Akins first head coaching position came at Kirkwood Community college in Cedar Rapids, Iowa. In her first season at the helm she would lead the eagles to their first ever national championship in Volleyball. She would step down following the 2004 season to accept the director of operations position at the University of Iowa.

=== Coe College ===
Woodin was hired in 2006 as the 15th head coach in the programs history. In 2011 she would lead the team to a her first conference title and a 31 win season, the most wins in program history at the time. Akins resigned from her position at Coe on January 9, 2025. She left as the winningest coach in program history with 388 wins and 5 conference titles.

=== Wartburg ===
Akins was announced at the 9th head coach in Wartburg history on January 10, 2025.

== Head coaching record ==
Record table
| Season | Team | Overall | Conference | Standing | Postseason |
|---|---|---|---|---|---|
Coe (American Rivers Conference) (2006–Present)
| 2006 | Coe | 26–8 | 5–3 | 3rd | NCAA First Round |
| 2007 | Coe | 20–12 | 6–2 | T–2nd | |
| 2008 | Coe | 4–30 | 1–7 | 9th | |
| 2009 | Coe | 9–24 | 1–6 | 8th | |
| 2010 | Coe | 19–14 | 3–5 | 7th | |
| 2011 | Coe | 31–4 | 8–0 | 1st | |
| 2012 | Coe | 20–13 | 6–1 | 2nd | |
| 2013 | Coe | 33–5 | 6–1 | 2nd | |
| 2014 | Coe | 29–9 | 7–0 | 1st | NCAA Regional Semifinal |
| 2015 | Coe | 23–3 | 4–3 | 4th | |
| 2016 | Coe | 24–10 | 5–3 | T-3rd | |
| 2017 | Coe | 14–16 | 4–4 | 5th | |
| 2018 | Coe | 20–11 | 5–3 | T–3rd | |
| 2019 | Coe | 15–18 | 5–3 | T–3rd | |
| 2020 | Coe | 7–1 | 7–1 | T–1st | |
| 2021 | Coe | 24–8 | 7–1 | 2nd | |
| 2022 | Coe | 27–6 | 8–0 | 1st | NCAA First Round |
| 2023 | Coe | 21–12 | 6–2 | 3rd | NCAA First Round |
| 2024 | Coe | 23–8 | 7–1 | 1st | |
| Coe: | | 388–224 (.634) | 101–46 (.687) | | |
Wartburg (American Rivers Conference) (2025–Present)
| 2025 | Wartburg | 15–12 | 4–4 | T–5th | |
| Wartburg: | | 15–12 (.556) | 4–4 (.500) | | |
| Total: | | 403–236 (.631) | | | |
National champion Postseason invitational champion Conference regular season champion Conference regular season and conference tournament champion Division regular season champion Division regular season and conference tournament champion Conference tournament champion
