= Sam Leal =

American Basketball Player and Coach

Current position
- Title: Head coach
- Team: Wartburg
- Conference: American Rivers
- Record: 30–23 (.566)

Biographical details
- Education: UMaine Farmington BS; Springfield MS

Playing career
- 2010–2014: UMaine Farmington

Coaching career (HC unless noted)
- 2014–2015: Southern Maine (assistant)
- 2017–2019: Springfield (assistant)
- 2019–2020: Bates (assistant)
- 2020–2024: UMaine Farmington
- 2024–present: Wartburg

Head coaching record
- Overall: 83–48 (.634)

Accomplishments and honors

Awards
- NAC Coach of the Year (2023)

Sam Leal is a former men's basketball player and current head coach at Wartburg College in Waverly, Iowa.

== Playing career ==
Sam Leal played college basketball at UMF in Farmington, Maine. In his junior campaign the Beavers would win the North Atlantic Conference regular season championship and finish with an overall record of 21–6. In his final year at UMF, the beavers would end their season with an overtime loss to Husson in the NAC tournament championship game.

== Coaching career ==
=== UMaine Farmington ===
Leal began is head coaching career at his alma mater, University of Maine at Farmington. Sam spent 4 seasons at the helm, recording a 53–25 overall record. Following the 2022–2023 season, Leal was named NAC coach of the year after posting a 19–8 overall record, 13–1 in conference play, earning them the #1 seed in the conference tournament. They would fall in the conference championship game to SUNY-Delhi.

=== Wartburg College ===
Sam Leal was announced as the 13th head men's basketball coach in Wartburg history on May 1, 2024. He replaced longtime head coach Dick Peth.

== Head coaching record ==
Record table
Season	Team	Overall	Conference	Standing	Postseason
UMaine Farmington (North Atlantic Conference) (2020–2024)
2020–21	UMaine Farmington	2–1			Postseason not held due to COVID-19
2021–22	UMaine Farmington	14–7	8-2	1st (East)	
2022–23	UMaine Farmington	19–8	13–1	1st (East)	
2023–24	UMaine Farmington	18–9	9–5	2nd (East)	
UMaine Farmington:		53–25 (.679)	30–8		
Wartburg Knights (American Rivers Conference) (2024–Present)
2024–25	Wartburg	16–11	8–8	T–5th	
2025–26	Wartburg	14–12	6–10	T–6th	
Wartburg:		30–23 (.566)	14–18 (.438)		
Total:		83–48 (.634)			
National champion Postseason invitational champion Conference regular season champion Conference regular season and conference tournament champion Division regular season champion Division regular season and conference tournament champion Conference tournament champion
