= KWAR =

- Waverly, Iowa; United States
- Frequency: 89.9 MHz
- Branding: Your Sound

Programming
- Format: Contemporary hits

Ownership
- Owner: Wartburg College

History
- First air date: 2008
- Former call signs: KWER (2007–2008)
- Call sign meaning: Wartburg College

Technical information
- Licensing authority: FCC
- Facility ID: 90974
- Class: A
- ERP: 1000 watts
- HAAT: 26 meters (85 ft)
- Transmitter coordinates: 42°43′37.00″N 92°29′1.00″W

Links
- Public license information: Public file; LMS
- Webcast: Listen live
- Website: Official website

KWAR (89.9 FM, "Your Sound") is a radio station broadcasting a contemporary hit format. Licensed to Waverly, Iowa, United States, the station is owned by Wartburg College.

== History ==
The Federal Communications Commission issued a construction permit for the station on April 27, 2005. The station was assigned the call sign KWER on June 25, 2007, and on April 8, 2008, changed its call sign to the current KWAR. On August 7, 2008, the station received its license to cover.
