= 2025 NCAA Division III Wrestling Championships =

American collegiate wrestling tournament in Providence

- Teams: 75
- Format: Knockout
- Finals site: Providence, Rhode Island; Amica Mutual Pavilion
- Champions: Wartburg & JWU
- Winning coach: Eric Keller & Lonnie Morris
- Television: FloSports

The 2025 NCAA Division III Wrestling Championships took place from March 14–15, 2025, in Providence, Rhode Island at the Amica Mutual Pavilion. The tournament is the 50th NCAA Division III Wrestling Championship.

For the first time in 92 years, two teams tied for the NCAA wrestling title and the first time since 1994 that a team other than Wartburg or Augsburg would win a title. Wartburg earned their 16th national title, while Johnson and Wales won the schools first.

== Team results ==
- Note: Top 10 only

Rank	Team	Points
1	Wartburg	83.5
1	JWU	83.5
3	Augsburg	74
4	Baldwin Wallace	69
5	Wisconsin–La Crosse	65
6	Coe	60
6	North Central (IL)	60
8	Alvernia	58
9	Coast Guard	40.5
9	Wisconsin–Eau Claire	40.5

== Individual results ==
- (H): Individual from hosting U.S. State

Weight	First	Second	Third	Fourth	Fifth	Sixth	Seventh	Eighth
125 lbs	#1 Josiah Fry; Johnson and Wales(H)	#2 Christian Guzman; North Central(IL)	#4 Mason Barrett; Averett	#3 Zach Beckner; Ferrum	Brayden Parke; Coe	#6 Jake Craig; Southern Maine	#5 Benyamin Kamali; Olivet	Keito Shaw; Alvernia
133 lbs	#1 Chase Randall; Coast Guard	#7 Bryce Parke; Coe	#5 Jaden Hinton; Baldwin Wallace	#8 James Day; Wabash	#4 Dominik Mallinder; UW-Whitewater	#3 Garrett Totten; TCNJ	Chance Suddeth; Augsburg	Connor Kidd; Luther
141 lbs	#5 Mark Samuel; Roanoke	Sean Conway; Chicago	Bradley Rosen; North Central (IL)	#4 Ty Bisek; Concordia-Moorhead	#1 Josh Wilson; Greensboro	#3 Pierre Baldwin; Central (IA)	Tommy Thongseng; Wartburg	#8 Luke Hoerle; Stevens
149 lbs	#1 Hayden Brown; Johnson and Wales(H)	#2 Angelo Centrone; Cortland	#6 Kyler Romero; Wartburg	#4 Matt Randolph; Augsburg	#5 Thomas Monn; McDaniel	#3 Colby Frost; Southern Maine	Michael Conklin; TCNJ	Mike Glynn; RIT
157 lbs	#1 Michael Petrella; Baldwin Wallace	#3 Cooper Pontelandolfo; NYU	#4 Eric Kinkaid; Loras	#5 Aiden Smith; Adrian	#2 Peter Kane; Williams	#7 Tyler Goebel; Wisconsin–La Crosse	#6 Ryan Smith; Stevens	#8 Clayton McDonough; Luther
165 lbs	#1 Matt Lackman; Alvernia	#3 Cooper Willis; Augsburg	#2 Tyler Gerber; Wisconsin–La Crosse	#7 Brayden Peet; UW-Whitewater	#5 Andrew Supers; Baldwin Wallace	Jake Deguire; Springfield	#4 CJ Christopher Shea; Wesleyan (CT)	Nicholas Sacco; TCNJ
174 lbs	#1 Jared Stricker; Wisconsin–Eau Claire	#3 Nathan Lackman; Alvernia	#7 Seth Goetzinger; Augsburg	#6 Dejon Glaster; Millikin	#4 Hunter Mays; TCNJ	#5 LJ Richardson; Coe	#2 Zeb Gnida; Loras	#8 Javen Estrada; North Central(IL)
184 lbs	#5 Marcus Orlandoni; Wisconsin–La Crosse	#3 Brandt Bombard; Augsburg	#1 Jack Ryan; SUNY Oneonta	Ganon Smith; Elizabethtown	#2 Kasey Ross; Wartburg	#7 Tyler Withers; Merchant Marine	#6 Jared Voss; Coe	Xavier Pommells; Ithaca
197 lbs	#1 Massoma Endene; Wartburg	#2 Cameron Butka; Wilkes	#5 Charles Baczek; Wabash	#6 Joseph Petrella; Baldwin Wallace	#7 Dylan Harr; Johnson and Wales(H)	Ian Pepple; Wisconsin–Eau Claire	#3 Ben Kawczynski; Wisconsin–La Crosse	Jackson Punzel; Wheaton (IL)
285 lbs	Mitch Williamson; Wartburg	#8 Carl DiGiorgio; Coast Guard	#3 Josh Harkless; RIT	#2 Rayshawn Dixon; Ferrum	#5 Austin Cooley; Schreiner	Adolfo Betancur; Johnson and Wales(H)	#6 Mauro Pellot; Alvernia	Robby Bates; North Central(IL)
