= Saint Sebald, Iowa =

Saint Sebald
- Unincorporated community
- Location within Iowa Location within the United States
- Coordinates: 42.7383174°N 91.5459787°W
- Country: United States
- State: Iowa
- County: Clayton
- Elevation: 1,135 ft (346 m)
- GNIS feature ID: 464732

Saint Sebald (also abbreviated as St. Sebald) is an unincorporated community in Clayton County, Iowa, United States.

== Geography ==
Saint Sebald is located near the junction of County Road W67 (Sebald Road) and Bighorn Road.

== History ==
St. Sebald Evangelical Lutheran Church was founded in 1853, named after a missionary to Germany. The church was the founding site of the Evangelical Lutheran Synod of Iowa on August 24, 1854. The current church structure was built in 1867. A historical marker is present at the site. The Iowa Synod'sWartburg Theological Seminary and Wartburg College were located in St. Sebald from 1857 to 1874 and 1857 to 1888, respectively. The campus outgrew the limitations of the area and was moved to Mendota, Illinois, and later Dubuque, Iowa.

Missionaries from the St. Sebald congregation traveled west to Wyoming, where in early 1860, the missionaries attempted to convert the native Cheyenne people to Lutheranism. The mission was mostly unsuccessful, but three Cheyenne boys were brought to St. Sebald. Two of them — Little Bone and Brown Moccasin — died of tuberculosis in 1865, and are buried in the St. Sebald Cemetery.

The St. Sebald post office opened in 1866. By 1906, Saint Sebald was considered a post-village of Clayton County. The post office closed in 1918.

In 1879, a one-room parochial schoolhouse opened in Saint Sebald. This was a German-speaking school. Later, a second schoolhouse, built by the county as a public school and informally called the English Schoolhouse, opened near the parochial school. The German parochial school was expanded in 1906, and then closed in 1918, when Pastor Georg Heinrich Fuckr retired. The building continued to be used for sunday schools, community events, and organizational meetings. The public St. Sebald School was one of 41 schools in Clayton County in 1926. Like most of the county schools, there was a single teacher.

== See also ==
- Giard, Iowa
