= Mendota Consolidated Community School District 289 =

School district in LaSalle County, Illinois, United States

Address
- 1806 Guiles Avenue Mendota, Illinois, 61342; United States

District information
- Type: Public
- Grades: PreK–8
- NCES District ID: 1725620

Students and staff
- Students: 1,065

Other information
- Website: www.m289.org

Mendota Consolidated Community School District 289 is a school district in Mendota, Illinois.

It has Blackstone School (Kindergarten-grade 1), Lincoln School (grades 2–4), and Northbrook School (grades 5–8).
