= Tiffany Pins =

American soccer coach

Current position
- Title: Head coach
- Team: Washington and Lee
- Conference: ODAC
- Record: 79–11–15 (.824)

Biographical details
- Born: Dubuque, Iowa
- Education: Wartburg College

Playing career
- 2000–2001: Green Bay
- 2002–2004: Wartburg

Coaching career (HC unless noted)
- 2005–2006: Wartburg (asst.)
- 2007–2010: Denison (asst.)
- 2011–2021: Wartburg
- 2022–Present: Washington and Lee

Head coaching record
- Overall: 211–64–42 (.732)
- Tournaments: NCAA: 8–10–1 (.447)

Accomplishments and honors

Championships
- 3x IIAC/ARC Regular Season (2011, 2015, 2020); 2x IIAC/ARC Tournament (2015, 2019); 3x ODAC Regular Season (2024, 2025, 2026); 2x ODAC Tournament (2024, 2025)

Awards
- 2x IIAC/ARC Coach of the Year (2015, 2020); 2x ODAC Coach of the year (2022, 2024); NSCAA Division III Regional Coach of the Year (2015)

Tiffany Pins (née Treanor) is a former American soccer player and the current head coach at Washington and Lee in Lexington, Virginia.

== Playing career ==
Pins played for the Green Bay Phoenix before transferring and playing for the Wartburg Knights for three seasons. She was a 3-year starter for the Knights and is still the school record holder for goals scored in a season and game.

== Coaching career ==
=== Wartburg ===
On January 18, 2011, Pins was named the head coach of her alma mater, Wartburg College in Waverly, Iowa. In her first season as a head coach, the Knights went 17–2–3 and won the 2nd conference regular season championship in the programs history. They would go on to advance to the second round of the NCAA tournament and fall in PK's to Wisconsin-Whitewater. In 2015 Pins guided the Knights to the programs third conference regular season title and second ever Sweet Sixteen appearance, where they fell to No. 4 ranked Washington University in St. Louis. During her tenure with the Knights, she led them to 7 of the programs 9 NCAA tournament appearances, 3 regular season conference championships and 2 conference tournament titles. Pins stepped down as head coach in June 2022 after 11 seasons at the helm, she left as the winningest soccer coach in Wartburg history.

=== Washington and Lee ===
On June 1, 2022, Pins was named the third head coach of the Washington and Lee Generals women's soccer program. In her first season she led the Generals to 2nd place in the ODAC and to the programs 7th NCAA tournament appearance as an at-large bid and their first since 2016. She was named the ODAC coach of the year for the 2022 season.

== Head coaching record ==
=== College ===
Record table
Season	Team	Overall	Conference	Standing	Postseason
Wartburg Knights (American Rivers Conference) (2011–2021)
2011	Wartburg	17–2–3	7–0–1	T-1st	NCAA Second Round
2012	Wartburg	12–5–3	6–1	2nd	NCAA First Round
2013	Wartburg	8–11–1	4–3	4th	
2014	Wartburg	10–6–4	4–2–1	4th	
2015	Wartburg	15–5–3	6–1	1st	NCAA Sweet Sixteen
2016	Wartburg	10–5–4	5–2–1	4th	
2017	Wartburg	10–6–4	4–1–3	4th	NCAA First Round
2018	Wartburg	13–6–1	6–1–1	2nd	NCAA First Round
2019	Wartburg	15–3–3	6–1–1	2nd	NCAA Second Round
2020	Wartburg	7–0	7–0	1st	Postseason not held; COVID-19
2021	Wartburg	15–4–1	7–1	2nd	NCAA First Round
Wartburg:		132–53–27 (.686)	62–13–8 (.795)		
Washington and Lee Generals (Old Dominion Athletic Conference) (2022–Present)
2022	Washington and Lee	14–2–5	8–0–2	2nd	NCAA First Round
2023	Washington and Lee	13–4–4	7–1–2	3rd	NCAA First Round
2024	Washington and Lee	20–2–1	10–0–0	1st	NCAA Sweet Sixteen
2025	Washington and Lee	18–2–3	10–0–0	1st	NCAA Sweet Sixteen
2026	Washington and Lee	14–1–2	8–1–1	T–1st	
Washington and Lee:		79–11–15 (.824)	43–2–5 (.910)		
Total:		211–64–42 (.732)			
National champion Postseason invitational champion Conference regular season champion Conference regular season and conference tournament champion Division regular season champion Division regular season and conference tournament champion Conference tournament champion
