= LeRoy Gardner III =

American amateur wrestler (born 1981)

LeRoy Gardner III (born February 4, 1981, in Minneapolis, Minnesota) was an American amateur wrestler.

== Biography ==
Gardner was the first NCAA Heavyweight National Champion in history for Wartburg College, Waverly, Iowa, in 2003 This individual contribution helped Wartburg College win the 2003 NCAA Wrestling Team Championship, including NCAA records for largest margin of victory and most team points scored.

He was a 1999 Minnesota State High School League Wrestling Championships qualifier for Hopkins High School. He was a 5th place winner at 1999 USA Wrestling Junior National Freestyle Wrestling Championships at 220 lbs. He was a 2001 United States Fila Jr. Greco-Roman National Champion and World Team Member at 130 kg, he also placed 4th at the 2001 United States Fila Jr. Freestyle National Championships. He placed 8th at 2001 Fila Jr. Greco-Roman World Championships in Tashkent, Uzbekistan. He placed 5th at the 2001 Greco-Roman World Team Trials at 130 kg.

He was a three time NCAA All-American at 285 lbs. placing 6th (2001), 3rd (2002) and 1st (2003) for Wartburg College of Waverly, IA. He was also a two time Iowa Intercollegiate Athletic Conference wrestling champion in 2002 and 2003.

== External links and references ==
- MSHSL 1999 Wrestling Tournament "MSHSL State Wrestling Tournament 1999275 AAA, Tstuff.com.
- 1999 State Tournament Results
- Abbot, Gary "Three wrestlers defend their Asics/Vaughan Junior National freestyle titles", Themat.com, 1999-07-25.
- 2001 Fila Jr Greco-Roman World Championships results
- World Team Trials Greco-Roman Challenge Tournament results
- National Wrestling Hall of Fame
- D3 Wrestling Interview
