= Eric Keller =

Wrestling Coach

Current position
- Title: Head coach
- Team: Wartburg
- Conference: ARC
- Record: 262–14 (.949)

Biographical details
- Education: UNI

Playing career

Wrestling
- 1995-1999: UNI

Coaching career (HC unless noted)
- 2000-2005: Wartburg (asst.)
- 2005-2006: North Central (IL)
- 2006-2010: Wartburg (asst.)
- 2010–present: Wartburg

Head coaching record
- Overall: 269–14 (.951)

Accomplishments and honors

Championships
- 10x NCAA National Champion (2011, 2012, 2013, 2014, 2016, 2017, 2018, 2022, 2025), 2026; 15x IIAC/ARC (2010-2019, 2021-2026); 9x NWCA National duals (2011, 2012, 2013, 2014, 2015, 2016, 2017, 2020, 2024)

Awards
- 2026 NWCA coach of the year 4x D3Wrestle.com National Coach of the Year (2012, 2015, 2017, 2018); 9x IIAC/ARC Coach of the year (2012, 2013, 2014, 2015, 2018, 2022, 2023, 2024, 2025, 2026); 2009 NWCA Assistant Coach of the Year; 2006 NWCA Rookie Coach of the Year

Eric Keller is a collegiate wrestling coach, currently at Wartburg College in Waverly, Iowa. Keller was promoted to co-head coach in 2010 with then head coach Jim Miller, and became the sole head coach after Miller stepped down following the 2012–2013 season.

== Wrestling career ==
=== High School ===
Keller went to high school in Indianola, Iowa at Indianola high school where he was a four-year member of the wrestling team. He would go on to finish his high school career 161-10-1 and was a 2 time Iowa high school state champion, finishing first in the 103 and 119 pound weight class.

=== College ===
After high school he went on to the University of Northern Iowa where he was a member of the wrestling team from 1995 to 1999. During his senior year in 1998-1999 he served as team captain and capped of the year with all-American honors at the NCAA Division I Wrestling Championships when he place 6th in the 133lb weight class.

== Collegiate coaching career ==
Keller began his coaching career at Wartburg College in 1999 following graduation at UNI. He would stay at Wartburg until he took the head coaching position at North Central College in Naperville, Illinois in 2005. In his one season at North Central he completed an undefeated season at 7-0 and was named National Wrestling Coaches Association's Rookie Coach of the Year at the 2006 national tournament. Following the 2005–2006 season Keller returned to wartburg and was named associate head coach, a position he would keep until being elevated to co-head coach for the 2010–2011 season. During his time as co-head coach Wartburg would go on to win 3 straight NCAA national titles. Prior to the 2012–2013 season Jim Miller would announce his retirement following the season, making Keller the sole head coach of Wartburg College for the 2013–2014 season. Wartburg would again go on to make history that season by winning their 4th straight NCAA title. Keller has won 9 NCAA Division III Wrestling Championships as head coach, 2022 in what would be his slimmest margin of victory. He would lead his team to a 9th title in 2025, when they tied with Johnson and Wales. A back and forth championship led to the first NCAA tie in 93 years. Keller captured his 10th NCAA title in 2026, tying previous head coach Jim Miller for most at Wartburg.

== Coaching results ==
Head coaching results
Season	Dual Record	Conference record	Conference Finish	NCAA Finish	All Americans	National Champions
North Central College
2005–06	7–0	–	2nd place, silver medalist(s)	14th	3	0
North Central Totals:	7–0	7–0				
Wartburg College
2010–11	19–1	8–0	1st place, gold medalist(s)	1st place, gold medalist(s)	7	2
2011–12	19–1	8–0	1st place, gold medalist(s)	1st place, gold medalist(s)	8	4
2012–13	19–0	7–0	1st place, gold medalist(s)	1st place, gold medalist(s)	7	2
2013–14	17–0	7–0	1st place, gold medalist(s)	1st place, gold medalist(s)	6	3
2014–15	18–1	7–0	1st place, gold medalist(s)	2nd place, silver medalist(s)	8	1
2015–16	19–0	7–0	1st place, gold medalist(s)	1st place, gold medalist(s)	8	1
2016–17	20–0	8–0	1st place, gold medalist(s)	1st place, gold medalist(s)	9	1
2017–18	18–2	8–0	1st place, gold medalist(s)	1st place, gold medalist(s)	8	3
2018–19	16–1	8–0	1st place, gold medalist(s)	6th	4	0
2019–20	16–1	7–1	2nd place, silver medalist(s)	—	5	0
2020–21	9–1	8–0	1st place, gold medalist(s)	(gold) NWCA	8	2
2021–22	13–1	8–0	1st place, gold medalist(s)	1st place, gold medalist(s)	7	0
2022–23	14–1–0	8–0	1st place, gold medalist(s)	2nd place, silver medalist(s)	5	2
2023–24	12–2–0	8–0	1st place, gold medalist(s)	2nd place, silver medalist(s)	5	1
2024–25	14–2	8–0	1st place, gold medalist(s)	1st place, gold medalist(s)	5	2
2025–26	15–1	8–0	1st place, gold medalist(s)	1st place, gold medalist(s)	7	2
Wartburg Totals:	262–14	142–1			107	26
Career Totals:	269–14	142–1–0			110	26
