= Old Main (Wartburg College) =

- Wartburg Teachers' Seminary
- U.S. National Register of Historic Places
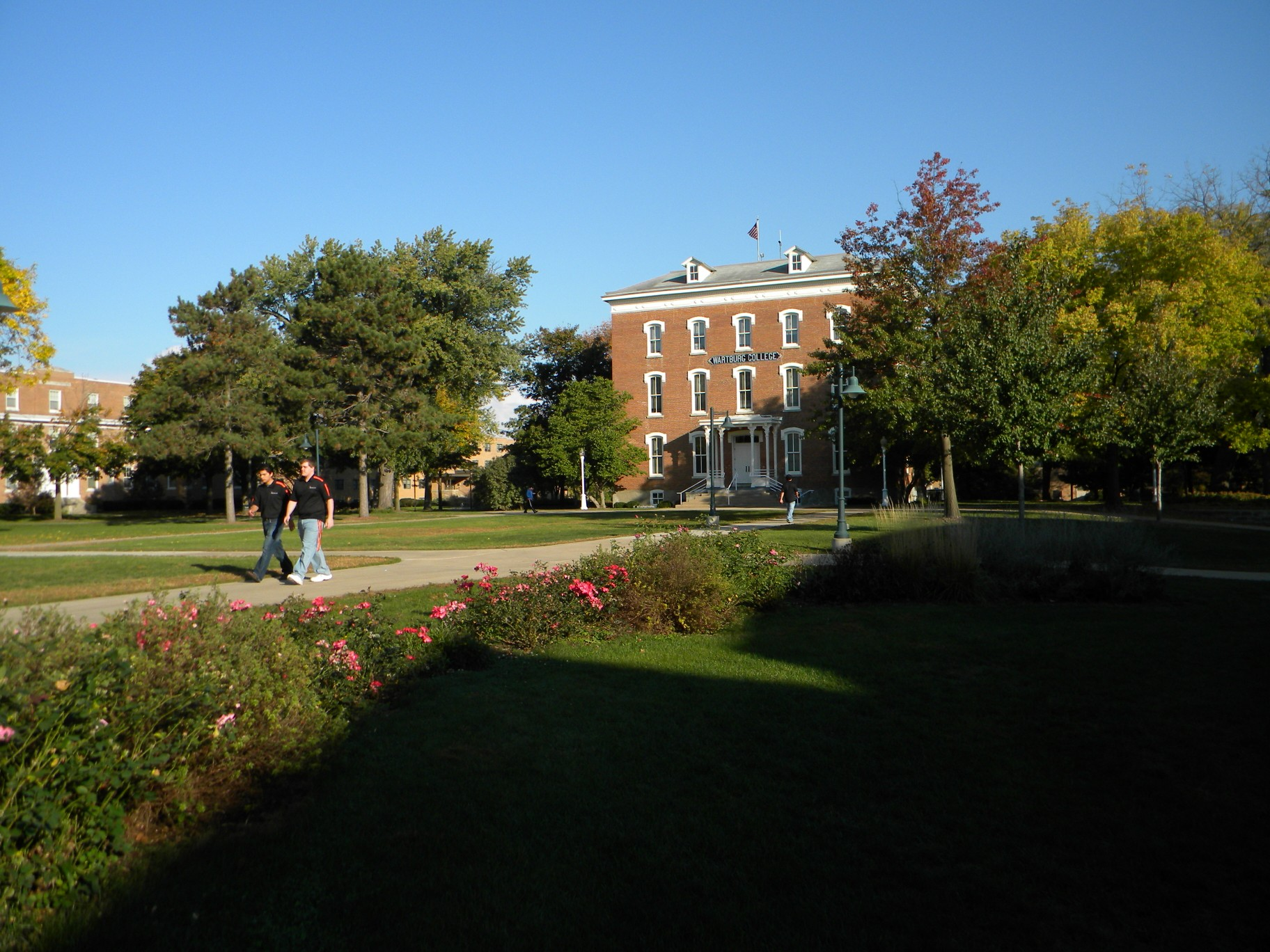

- Location within Iowa Location within the United States
- Location: Wartburg College campus, Waverly, Iowa
- Coordinates: 42°43′45″N 92°28′54″W
- Area: less than one acre
- Built: 1880
- Architectural style: Italianate
- NRHP reference No.: 78001208
- Added to NRHP: January 20, 1978

Old Main is a historic building located on the campus of Wartburg College in Waverly, Iowa, United States. When Wartburg was established in Waverly in 1879 it was a normal school that educated men to teach in Lutheran parochial schools. This building was constructed the following year, which makes it the "first structure associated with German Lutheran higher education in Iowa." It is a three-story brick structure in the vernacular Italianate style. It is five bays wide and four bays deep, and capped with a hipped roof with six small gabled dormers. The building features narrow eaves, a denticular cornice, a paneled frieze, corbelled brick window hoods that are painted white, and cast-iron window sills. When it was built it housed all school functions. The dormitory was in the attic, classrooms doubled as living areas when they were not used for educational purposes, the two teachers were housed on the first floor, and dining/kitchen facilities were located in the basement. It has subsequently housed a variety of the schools functions. The building was listed on the National Register of Historic Places in 1978 as the Wartburg Teachers' Seminary.
