= Rebecca Ehretsman =

American occupational therapist, academic administrator, president of Wartburg College

18th President of Wartburg College
- Incumbent
- Assumed office July 1, 2022
- Preceded by: Darrel D. Colson

Personal details
- Born: Rebecca L. Ehretsman; September 6, 1972 (age 53) Chicago, Illinois, U.S.
- Education: Purdue University (BA); Washington University in St. Louis (MS); Saint Louis University (PhD)

Rebecca L. Ehretsman (formerly von der Heyde and Neiduski; born September 6, 1972) is an American occupational therapist and academic administrator serving as the eighteenth president of Wartburg College since 2022. She is a hand therapist specialized in flexor tendon rehabilitation.

== Life ==
Ehretsman was born September 6, 1972, in Chicago in a Lutheran family. Both of her parents were educators. She completed a B.A. in movement and sport science with minors in psychology and English at Purdue University in 1994. In 1997, she earned a M.S. in occupational therapy from Washington University in St. Louis. Christine Novak was her master's project chair. Ehretsman's master's thesis titled, Subjective Recovery of Nerve Graft Donor Site, was published in the Annals of Plastic Surgery in 1999.

She is a certified hand therapist specializing in flexor tendon rehabilitation. From 1998 to 1999, she was an occupational therapist at Barnes-Jewish Hospital. She was a hand therapist at the Milliken Hand Rehabilitation Center from 1999 to 2013 and Shriners Hospitals for Children from 2007 to 2013. From 2002 to 2013, Ehretsman was an associate professor of occupational therapy with tenure at Maryville University. She graduated with a Ph.D. in education from Saint Louis University in 2009. Her dissertation was titled, Goal Orientation and Problem-based Learning: A Qualitative Analysis in Occupational Therapy Education. Michael P. Grady was her doctoral advisor. From 2013 to 2017, she was the chair and program director of the department of occupational therapy at Concordia University Wisconsin. From June 2017 to June 2022, she was a professor of health sciences and dean of the school of health sciences at Elon University.

On July 1, 2022, Ehretsman became the eighteenth president of Wartburg College, succeeding Darrel D. Colson. She is its first female president. In 2025 the Board of Regents approved an extension to her contract through to May 2031.

Ehretsman is a member of the board of the Guatemala Healing Hands Foundation. She has volunteered on over 20 missions, providing hand surgery and therapy to children and education for professionals and students.

== Selected works ==
- Abzug, Joshua M.; Kozin, Scott H.; Neiduski, Rebecca, eds. (2019). Pediatric Hand Therapy. Elsevier Health Sciences. ISBN 978-0-323-53093-4.
