= Wartburg Knights men's wrestling =

American wrestling team of the Wartburg College Knights

- Head coach: Eric Keller (16th season)
- Assistant coach: Trevor Kittleson; Elard Coello; Brady Kyner
- Conference: A-R-C
- Location: Waverly, IA
- Arena: Levick Arena (capacity: 2,000)
- Nickname: Knights
- Colors: Orange and Black

Team national championships
- 17

National championship years
- 1996, 1999, 2003, 2004, 2006, 2008, 2009, 2011, 2012, 2013, 2014, 2016, 2017, 2018, 2022, 2025, 2026

NCAA individual champions
- 54

All-Americans
- 260

Conference championships
- 1948, 1949, 1950, 1951, 1954, 1960, 1974, 1976, 1977, 1978, 1993, 1994, 1995, 1996, 1997, 1998, 1999, 2000, 2001, 2002, 2003, 2004, 2005, 2006, 2007, 2008, 2009, 2010, 2011, 2012, 2013, 2014, 2015, 2016, 2017, 2018, 2019, 2021, 2022, 2023, 2024, 2025, 2026

The Wartburg Knights men's wrestling program is one of the most successful programs in NCAA Division III. They are a member of the American Rivers Conference (A-R-C) and wrestle for Wartburg College. Wartburg has 17 NCAA DIII National Championships while finishing as a runner-up 11 times. After the 2025 tournament they hold the record for most NCAA Team National Titles. They have also won 13 NWCA National Duals titles.

This page is exclusive to Wartburg men's wrestling. The school announced the addition of women's wrestling in 2021, with varsity competition originally set to start in 2022–23 but delayed to 2023–24. At the time, women's wrestling was part of the NCAA Emerging Sports for Women program; it became an official NCAA championship sport in 2025–26.

== History ==
Wartburg wrestling began in 1955. It took until 1996 when Wartburg would win their first ever National Championship. In 2022, Wartburg would go on to win its NCAA leading 15th National Championship by beating Wabash by one single point 79-78.

== Battle of the burgs ==
Since 1995 only two teams have won a DIII NCAA wrestling team title, those two being Wartburg College and Augsburg University. Both teams have gone back and forth since then, which created one of the greatest rivalries in any sport. The rivalry gained national attention when it was placed front and center on the New York Times sports section in 2012. The two teams meet every year and wrestle for a belt in a dual aptly named "Battle of the Burgs", with Wartburg winning straight, in 2023. The rivalry was featured on LG's series "the rivalries" during the 2023-2024 season. The series followed both Augsburg and Wartburg throughout the season and their battle for supremacy in DIII wrestling. Augsburg would go on to win the "Battle of the Burgs" that season and win the NCAA title, with Wartburg coming in 2nd.

== Home meets ==
Home meets are held in the Levick Arena in Waverly, Iowa.

== Championships ==
=== NCAA team championships ===
Year	Coach	NCAA Meet Points	Duals Record (W-L-T)
1996	Jim Miller	95.5	17-2
1999	Jim Miller	117.5	17-1
2003	Jim Miller	166.5	22-1
2004	Jim Miller	156.5	27-1
2006	Jim Miller	145.4	27-0
2008	Jim Miller	147	22-0
2009	Jim Miller	117.5	15-2-1
2011	Jim Miller/Eric Keller	117	19-1
2012	Jim Miller/Eric Keller	141.5	19-1
2013	Jim Miller/Eric Keller	103	19-0
2014	Eric Keller	103.5	18-0
2016	Eric Keller	129.5	19-0
2017	Eric Keller	129.5	20-0
2018	Eric Keller	136.5	18-2
2022	Eric Keller	79	13-1
2025	Eric Keller	83.5	14-2
2026	Eric Keller	110	15-1
17 NCAA Championships

=== NWCA Team Championships ===
2021 (no NCAA Championship was held due to the COVID-19 Pandemic)

=== ARC/IIAC Conference Championships ===
1948, 1949, 1950, 1951, 1954, 1960, 1974, 1976, 1977, 1978, 1993, 1994, 1995, 1996, 1997, 1998, 1999, 2000, 2001, 2002, 2003, 2004, 2005, 2006, 2007, 2008, 2009, 2010, 2011, 2012, 2013, 2014, 2015, 2016, 2017, 2018, 2019, 2021, 2022, 2023, 2024, 2025, 2026

=== NWCA National Duals Championship ===
2003, 2004, 2006, 2008, 2011, 2012, 2013, 2014, 2015, 2016, 2017, 2020, 2024

=== NCAA Individual Champions ===
Year	NCAA Champion	Weight Class
1989	Dean Gavin	190 lbs
1993	Tom Hogan	150 lbs
1993	Lance Christensen	167 lbs
1994	Zane Braggs	118 lbs
1996	Tom Smith	126 lbs
1996	Jamal Fox	142 lbs
1997	Tom Smith	126 lbs
1997	Dusty Rhodes	134 lbs
1998	Ben Shane	142 lbs
1999	Zac Weiglein	125 lbs
1999	Ben Shane	149 lbs
2000	Zac Weiglein	125 lbs
2003	Heath Ropp	125 lbs
2003	Wil Kelly	141 lbs
2003	LeRoy Gardner III	Hwt.
2004	Dustin Hinschberger	141 lbs
2004	Bart Mehlert	149 lbs
2004	Ryan Sturm	184 lbs
2004	Akeem Carter	197 lbs
2005	Dustin Hinschberger	141 lbs
2005	Akeem Carter	197 lbs
2006	Tyler Hubbard	125 lbs
2006	Dustin Hinschberger	141 lbs
2007	T.J. Miller	197 lbs
2007	Blake Gillis	Hwt.
2008	Jacob Naig	149 lbs
2008	Aaron Wernimont	157 lbs
2008	Romeo Djoumessi	184 lbs
2009	Aaron Wernimont	157 lbs
2009	Justin Hanson	197 lbs
2010	Byron Tate	197 lbs
2011	Byron Tate	197 lbs
2011	John Helgerson	Hwt.
2012	Kenny Anderson	125 lbs
2012	Kodie Silvestri	141 lbs
2012	Landon Williams	165 lbs
2012	Byron Tate	197 lbs
2013	Kenny Anderson	133 lbs
2014	Kenny Anderson	133 lbs
2014	Cole Welter	165 lbs
2014	Landon Williams	174 lbs
2015	Kenny Martin	149 lbs
2016	Kenny Martin	149 lbs
2017	Eric DeVos	174 lbs
2018	Brock Rathbun	133 lbs
2018	Cross Cannone	149 lbs
2018	Kyle Fank	197 lbs
2023	Zane Mulder	174 lbs
2023	Massoma Endene	197 lbs
2024	Massoma Endene	197 lbs
2025	Massoma Endene	197 lbs
2025	Mitchell Williamson	Hwt.
2026	Kade Blume	141 lbs
2026	Kasey Ross	184 lbs

The following table counts the achievements of Wartburg Knight wrestlers by name as opposed to year.

Wrestler	NCAA Championships	NCAA Runners-up
Kenny Anderson	3	0
Massoma Endene	3	0
Dustin Hinschberger	3	0
Byron Tate	3	0
Akeem Carter	2	1
Kenny Martin	2	0
Ben Shane	2	0
Tom Smith	2	1
Zac Weiglein	2	0
Aaron Wernimont	2	0
Landon Williams	2	0
Kade Blume	1	0
Zane Braggs	1	1
Cross Cannone	1	1
Lance Christensen	1	0
Eric DeVos	1	1
Romeo Djoumessi	1	0
Kyle Fank	1	0
Dean Gavin	1	0
LeRoy Gardner III	1	0
Blake Gillis	1	3
Justin Hanson	1	0
John Helgerson	1	1
Tom Hogan	1	1
Tyler Hubbard	1	0
Wil Kelly	1	0
Bart Mehlert	1	0
TJ Miller	1	1
Zane Mulder	1	1
Jacob Naig	1	1
Brock Rathbun	1	0
Dusty Rhodes	1	0
Heath Ropp	1	0
Kasey Ross	1	0
Kodi Silvestri	1	1
Ryan Sturm	1	0
Cole Welter	1	0
Mitchell Williamson	1	1
Bruce Brye	0	2
Jon Dawley	0	1
Mike Alesch	0	1
Josh Dodd	0	1
Matt Buskohl	0	1
Ozzie Saxon	0	2
Kevin Bratland	0	1
Sonny Alvarez	0	1
Cory Connell	0	1
Scott Kauffman	0	1
Jake Helvey	0	1
Brian Borchers	0	1
Drew Wagenhoffer	0	1
Zach McKray	0	1
Bradley Banks	0	2
Ryan Fank	0	1
Devin Peterson	0	1
Nick Michael	0	1
Gerard Roman	0	1
Logan Thomsen	0	2
Tyler Lutes	0	1
Zayren Terukina	0	1
TOTALS	54	41

== Head coaching history ==
As of the completion of 2026 season

Tenure	Coach	Years	Record	Pct.
1955–1966, 1967-1968	Norm Johansen	10	50–49–7	.505
1966–1967	Kaye Young	1	4–7–0	.364
1968–1990	Dick Walker	22	175-85-4	.670
1991-2013	Jim Miller	22	411–38–2	.914
2010–present	Eric Keller	16	262–14	.949
Totals	5 coaches	65 seasons	845–193–14	.810

== Notable Wartburg wrestlers ==
- Punahele Soriano
- LeRoy Gardner III
- Dan Ige
- Landon Williams

== See also ==
- National Wrestling Hall of Fame and Museum
