= NCAA Division III Men's Wrestling Championships =

American collegiate events

- Association: NCAA
- Sport: College wrestling
- Founded: 1974; 52 years ago
- Division: Division III
- No. of teams: 68 of 109 (2023)
- Country: United States
- Most recent champion: Wartburg (17th)
- Most titles: Wartburg (17)
- Website: NCAA.com

The NCAA Division III Men's Wrestling Championships for individuals and teams were first officially sponsored in 1974 and have since been held annually.

The NCAA Division III Men's Wrestling Championships is a double-elimination tournament for individuals competing in ten weight classes. Eighteen wrestlers in each class qualify by being one of the top three finishers at six Regional tournaments. During the championships, individual match winners earn points based on the level and quality of the victory, which are totaled to determine the team championship standings.

In addition to determining the national championship, the NCAA Division III Men's Wrestling Championships also determine the Division III All-America team. The top eight finishers in each weight class qualify for Division III All-American status.

Women's wrestling became part of the NCAA Emerging Sports for Women program in June 2020, and graduated to full championship status in January 2025. The first NCAA championship, which uses a "National Collegiate" format open to members of all NCAA divisions, is being held in 2025–26. A separate Division III women's championship will be established in 2027–28.

== Team champions ==
- Prior to 1963, only a single national championship was held for all members of the NCAA; Division II competition began in 1963, with Division III following in 1974.
- School names used are those current in the years listed.

NCAA Division III Men's Wrestling Championships
Year	Host city (Host institution)	Team championship				Most Outstanding Wrestler (Team) (Weight)
Year	Host city (Host institution)	Winner	Points	Runner-up	Points	Most Outstanding Wrestler (Team) (Weight)
1974	Wilkes-Barre, PA (Wilkes College)	Wilkes College	135 1/2	John Carroll University	86 1/2	Jim Fallis (Lake Superior State College) (158)
1975	University Heights, OH (John Carroll University)	John Carroll University	111	Montclair State College	96	Nabil Guketlov (Montclair State College) (118)
1976	Cedar Rapids, IA (Coe College)	Montclair State College ^{(1)}	143	John Carroll University	112 1/4	Vince Tundo (Montclair State College) (126)
1977	Binghamton, NY (State University of New York at Binghamton)	The College at Brockport, State University of New York ^{(1)}	99 1/4	Humboldt State University	93	Andy Zook (Millersville State College) (126)
1978	Wheaton, IL (Wheaton College (Illinois))	State University of New York at Buffalo	91 3/4	Millersville State College	90	Ken Mallory (Montclair State College) (134)
1979	Arcata, CA (Humboldt State University)	Trenton State College ^{(1)}	77 3/4	The College at Brockport, State University of New York	77 1/2	Jeff Freedman (Ashland College) (158)
1980	New London, CT (United States Coast Guard Academy)	The College at Brockport, State University of New York ^{(2)}	111 1/4	Trenton State College	88 3/4	Tom Jacoutot (State University of New York at Buffalo) (118)
1981	University Heights, OH (John Carroll University)	Trenton State College ^{(2)}	111 3/4	The College at Brockport, State University of New York	100	Jeff Bouslog (Luther College) (158)
1982	Cortland, NY (SUNY College at Cortland)	The College at Brockport, State University of New York ^{(3)}	111 1/2	Trenton State College ^{(3)}	93 1/2	Frank Famiano (The College at Brockport, State University of New York) (126)
1983	Wheaton, IL (Wheaton College (Illinois))	The College at Brockport, State University of New York ^{(4)}	85 3/4	Trenton State College	80 3/4	Frank Famiano (The College at Brockport, State University of New York) (126)
1984	Binghamton, NY (State University of New York at Binghamton)	Trenton State College ^{(3)}	96 3/4	Augsburg College	68 1/2	Bob Glaberman; Trenton State College)) (158)
1985	Rock Island, IL (Augustana College (Illinois))	Trenton State College ^{(4)}	67	Central College (IA)	59 1/4	Tim Jacoutot (Trenton State College) (118)
1986	Trenton, NJ (Trenton State College)	Montclair State College	87 1/4	The College at Brockport, State University of New York	78	Nick Milonas (Montclair State College) (126)
1987	Buffalo, NY (State University of New York at Buffalo)	Trenton State College ^{(5)}	107 1/2	The College at Brockport, State University of New York	70 3/4	John Monaco (Montclair State College) (167)
1988	Wheaton, IL (Wheaton College (Illinois))	St. Lawrence University	71	Montclair State College	66 3/4	Tim Jacoutot (Trenton State College) (118)
1989	University Heights, OH (John Carroll University)	Ithaca College ^{(1)}	72 1/2	Delaware Valley College of Science and Agriculture	64 1/2	Pete Gonzalez (Montclair State College) (126)
1990	Ithaca, NY (Ithaca College)	Ithaca College ^{(2)}	81	Augsburg College	64	Rob Llorca (University of Wisconsin–Whitewater) (158)
1991	Rock Island, Illinois (Augustana College (Illinois))	Augsburg College ^{(1)}	92	Trenton State College	59 1/2	Rob Llorca (University of Wisconsin–Whitewater) (158)
1992	Trenton, NJ (Trenton State College)	The College at Brockport, State University of New York ^{(5)}	76 1/2	Augsburg College	62 1/2	Peter Wang (University of Chicago) (177); Raphael Wilson (Augustana College (IL)) (134)
1993	New London, CT (United States Coast Guard Academy)	Augsburg College ^{(2)}	93	Wartburg College	92	Gary Kroells (Augsburg College) (158)
1994	Stevens Point, Wisconsin (University of Wisconsin–Stevens Point)	Ithaca College ^{(3)}	77 3/4	Wartburg College	75	Raphael Wilson (Augustana College (IL)) 142
1995	Rock Island, Illinois (Augustana College (IL))	Augsburg College ^{(3)}	84 1/2	Trenton State College	76 1/2	Tom Layte (Augustana College (IL)) (150)
1996	Cortland, NY (SUNY College at Cortland)	Wartburg College ^{(1)}	95 1/2	Augsburg College	89 1/2	Ron Vosburg (The College at Brockport, State University of New York) (134)
1997	Ada, OH (Ohio Northern University)	Augsburg College ^{(4)}	122	Wartburg College	80	Aaron Fitt (Lycoming College) (150)
1998	Dubuque, IA (Loras College)	Augsburg College ^{(5)}	132	Wartburg College	90	Matt Hamill (Rochester Institute of Technology) (190)
1999	Trenton, NJ (The College of New Jersey)	Wartburg College ^{(2)}	117 1/2	Augsburg College	116	Matt Hamill (Rochester Institute of Technology) (197)
2000	Ada, OH (Ohio Northern University)	Augsburg College ^{(6)}	136	Wartburg College	88	Josh Cagle (Augsburg College) (149)
2001	Waverly, IA (Wartburg College)	Augsburg College ^{(7)}	119 1/2	University of Wisconsin–La Crosse	72	Nick Ackerman (Simpson College) (174)
2002	Wilkes-Barre, PA (Wilkes University)	Augsburg College ^{(8)}	87	Upper Iowa University; Wartburg College	81	Jimmy Wallace (Wilmington College (OH)) (157)
2003	Ada, OH (Ohio Northern University)	Wartburg College ^{(3)}	166 1/2	Augsburg College	84 1/2	Rami Ratel (Montclair State University) (149)
2004	Dubuque, IA (Loras College)	Wartburg College ^{(4)}	156 1/2	Augsburg College	140 1/2	Joe Moon (Augsburg College) (174)
2005	Northfield, MN (St. Olaf College)	Augsburg College ^{(9)}	162	Wartburg College	104 1/2	Ryan Allen (University of Wisconsin–La Crosse) (Hwt.)
2006	Trenton, NJ (The College of New Jersey)	Wartburg College ^{(5)}	145 1/2	University of Wisconsin–La Crosse	106	Duane Bastress (York College of Pennsylvania) (184)
2007	Dubuque, IA (Loras College)	Augsburg College ^{(10)}	135 1/2	Wartburg College	99 1/2	Matt Pyle (Luther College) (149)
2008	Cedar Rapids, IA (Cornell College, Coe College & IIAC)	Wartburg College ^{(6)}	147	University of Wisconsin–La Crosse	100	Josh Chelf (University of Wisconsin–La Crosse) (174)
2009	Cedar Rapids, IA (Cornell College, Coe College & IIAC)	Wartburg College ^{(7)}	117 1/2	Augsburg College	105	Michael Wilcox (Delaware Valley College) (184)
2010	Cedar Rapids, IA (Cornell College, Coe College & IIAC)	Augsburg College ^{(11)}	110 1/2	University of Wisconsin–La Crosse	100 1/2	Vincent Renaut (U.S. Merchant Marine Academy) (165)
2011	La Crosse, WI (University of Wisconsin–La Crosse)	Wartburg College ^{(8)}	117	Augsburg College	88 1/2	Myanganbayar Batsukh (Saint John's University (MN)) (149)
2012	La Crosse, WI (University of Wisconsin–La Crosse)	Wartburg College ^{(9)}	141 1/2	Augsburg College	86 1/2	Kodie Silvestri (Wartburg College) (141)
2013	Cedar Rapids, IA (Cornell College)	Wartburg College ^{(10)}	103	Elmhurst College	82	Greg Sanders (Concordia University Wisconsin) (149)
2014	Cedar Rapids, IA (Cornell College)	Wartburg College ^{(11)}	103 1/2	University of Wisconsin–Whitewater	67	Nazar Kulchytskyy (University of Wisconsin–Oshkosh) (157)
2015	Hershey, PA (Elizabethtown College)	Augsburg College ^{(12)}	100	Wartburg College	89 1/2	Mike Fuenffinger (Augsburg College) (125)
2016	Cedar Rapids, IA (Cornell College, Coe College & IIAC)	Wartburg College ^{(12)}	129 1/2	Messiah College	100	Riley Lefever (Wabash College) (184)
2017	La Crosse, WI (University of Wisconsin–La Crosse)	Wartburg College ^{(13)}	129 1/2	Augsburg College	79	Riley Lefever (Wabash College) (197)
2018	Cleveland, OH (Baldwin Wallace University)	Wartburg College ^{(14)}	136 1/2	Augsburg University	82	Lucas Jeske (Augsburg University) (165)
2019	Roanoke, VA (Ferrum College)	Augsburg University ^{(13)}	130	Loras College	66	Jay Albis (Johnson & Wales University) (125)
2020	Canceled due to the coronavirus pandemic					
2021	Canceled due to the coronavirus pandemic					
2022	Cedar Rapids, IA (American Rivers Conference)	Wartburg College ^{(15)}	79	Wabash College	78	Bradan Birt (Millikin University) (165)
2023	Roanoke, VA (Ferrum College)	Augsburg University ^{(14)}	101	Wartburg College	66 1/2	Jaritt Shinhoster (Wisconsin-Whitewater) (184)
2024	La Crosse, WI (University of Wisconsin–La Crosse)	Augsburg University ^{(15)}	95	Wartburg College	87 1/2	Chase Randall (Coast Guard) (133)
2025	Providence, RI (Johnson & Wales University (Providence))	Wartburg College ^{(16)} / Johnson & Wales (RI) ^{(1)}	83 1/2	Augsburg University	74	Jared Stricker (UW-Eau Claire) (174)
2026	Cedar Rapids, IA (American Rivers Conference)	Wartburg College ^{(17)}	110	University of Wisconsin–La Crosse	68	Christian Guzman (North Central) (125)

Note: Shaded scores = Closest margin of victory, 1/4 point in 1979 & widest margin of victory, 82 points in 2003.

== Team titles ==
School	Team titles	Last championship
Wartburg College	17	2026
Augsburg University ^{A}	15	2024
The College of New Jersey ^{B}	5	1987
The College at Brockport, SUNY	5	1992
Ithaca College	3	1994
Montclair State University ^{C}	2	1986
Wilkes University ^{D}	1	1974
John Carroll University	1	1975
University at Buffalo	1	1978
St. Lawrence University	1	1988
Johnson & Wales (RI)	1	2025

- ^{A} Was Augsburg College.
- ^{B} Was Trenton State College.
- ^{C} Was Montclair State College.
- ^{D} Was Wilkes College.

== See also ==
- NCAA Division I Men's Wrestling Championships
- NCAA Division II Wrestling Championships
- NAIA national wrestling championship
- U Sports (Canada)
- Pre-NCAA Wrestling Champion
- Intercollegiate women's wrestling champions
