= WMKB (FM) =

Coordinates: 41.6211°N 89.0890°W

- Earlville, Illinois; United States
- Broadcast area: Mendota / La Salle
- Frequency: 102.9 MHz

Programming
- Format: Classic Rock

Ownership
- Owner: KM Communications

History
- First air date: February 3, 2003

Technical information
- Licensing authority: FCC
- Facility ID: 88204
- Class: A
- ERP: 2,150 watts
- HAAT: 170 meters (560 ft)

Links
- Public license information: Public file; LMS

WMKB (102.9 FM) is a radio station licensed to Earlville, Illinois, United States, covering Mendota, La Salle, Amboy, and vicinity in Northern Illinois. WMKB airs an automated Classic rock format and is owned by KM Radio.

== History ==
WMKB began broadcasting February 3, 2003, and originally aired a classic rock format. On January 2, 2012, the station adopted a regional Mexican format branded "102.9 Mex Mix". During a severe thunderstorm in mid-November, 2020, WMKB broadcast "dead air", that is, no audio was heard, likely related to the storm. The station remained in that state until April 1, 2021, when the transmitter went off the air. In early 2022, the station briefly returned to the air broadcasting NowMedia network programming, which includes Spanish News/Talk, and aired music programming with an oldies format overnight, however the station spent the remainder of 2022 broadcasting silence. On January 10, 2023, the station resumed a normal broadcast schedule. The FCC extended their license to broadcast through December 1, 2028. As of September 29, 2023 the station applied for an authority to remain silent. After being off the air for nearly a year, WMKB returned to the air with a classic rock format.
