= Dick Peth =

American Player and Basketball Coach

Biographical details
- Born: Tomah, Wisconsin
- Education: Iowa

Playing career
- 1975-1978: Iowa

Coaching career (HC unless noted)
- 1980-1985: Denver (assistant)
- 1985-1997: Denver
- 1997-2024: Wartburg

Head coaching record
- Overall: 622–415 (.600)
- Tournaments: 4-5

Accomplishments and honors

Championships
- 2x Colorado Athletic Conference Regular season (1994, 1996) 3x Colorado Athletic Conference Tournament (1992, 1994, 1996) 3x IIAC/ARC Regular Season (2001, 2005, 2006) 2x IIAC/ARC Tournament (2001, 2017)

Awards
- 2x IIAC Coach of the year (2001, 2005)

Dick Peth is a former men's basketball player and coach. In April 2024, Peth announced his retirement from Wartburg College after 27 seasons at the helm. He is an alumnus of the University of Iowa, 1979.

== Playing career ==
Dick Peth played high school basketball at Tomah High School in Tomah, Wisconsin. In high school, he was a 3 time first-team all-conference player and finished his career with 1,331 points which ranks second on the LaCrosse Tribune's all-time boys' basketball list. In 2013, Peth was inducted into the Wisconsin Basketball Hall of Fame. After high school, he went on to play basketball at the University of Iowa from 1975 to 1979 for legendary Iowa head coach Lute Olson. Peth was a 4-year member of the basketball program. During his senior season he was named team co-captain and started for the Big Ten champion 1978–79 Iowa team. To date this is the last regular season championship Iowa has won.

== Coaching career ==
=== Denver University ===
Peth began his coaching career in 1980 as an assistant for Denver University. He was elevated to head coach in April 1985 following the death of then head coach Floyd Theard, who died from a heart attack following the 1985 season. Peth went on to coach for the Denver for 12 seasons. During his tenure he led them to 221 wins and 3 NCAA tournament appearances. He was inducted into Denver University's athletic hall of fame in 2020 and is still the winningest coach in the program history.

=== Wartburg College ===
Dick Peth took over the Wartburg men's basketball program in 1997. During his current tenure at Wartburg he has led them to three regular season Iowa Intercollegiate Athletic Conference championships, including back to back in 2005 and 2006. In 2017 his Wartburg Knight basketball team shocked the conference by winning the IIAC tournament as the tournament's 6th seed. They would go on to reach the NCAA Sweet Sixteen, upsetting #10 Benedictine College and #4 UW-River Falls in the first and second rounds. In December 2021, Peth entered the 600 win club following Wartburg's 82–70 win against University of Wisconsin–Eau Claire.

== Head coaching record ==
Record table
| Season | Team | Overall | Conference | Standing | Postseason |
|---|---|---|---|---|---|
University of Denver Pioneers (Colorado Athletic Conference) (1985–1997)
| 1985–86 | Denver | 17-12 | | | |
| 1986–87 | Denver | 20–9 | | | |
| 1987–88 | Denver | 19-9 | | | |
| 1988–89 | Denver | 18-12 | | | |
| 1989–90 | Denver | 16-12 | | | |
| 1990–91 | Denver | 19-10 | | | |
| 1991–92 | Denver | 26-6 | | | NCAA Second Round |
| 1992–93 | Denver | 15–11 | | | |
| 1993–94 | Denver | 17-13 | | 1st | NCAA First Round |
| 1994–95 | Denver | 18-10 | | | |
| 1995–96 | Denver | 22-7 | | 1st | NCAA First Round |
| 1996–97 | Denver | 14-12 | | | |
| Denver: | | 221-123 (.642) | | | |
Wartburg Knights (Iowa Intercollegiate Athletic Conference) (1997–2018)
| 1997–98 | Wartburg | 16-9 | 13-7 | | |
| 1998–99 | Wartburg | 13-12 | 11-10 | | |
| 1999–00 | Wartburg | 12-12 | 10-10 | | |
| 2000–01 | Wartburg | 24-4 | 17-1 | 1st | NCAA Second Round |
| 2001–02 | Wartburg | 20-8 | 14-4 | 2nd | |
| 2002–03 | Wartburg | 21-7 | 14-4 | 2nd | |
| 2003–04 | Wartburg | 20-8 | 11-5 | T–2nd | |
| 2004–05 | Wartburg | 23–5 | 15-1 | 1st | |
| 2005–06 | Wartburg | 19-6 | 12-4 | 1st | |
| 2006–07 | Wartburg | 11-15 | 5-11 | 6th | |
| 2007–08 | Wartburg | 9-16 | 6-10 | 7th | |
| 2008–09 | Wartburg | 15-13 | 8-8 | 4th | |
| 2009–10 | Wartburg | 15-12 | 8–8 | 6th | |
| 2010–11 | Wartburg | 10-14 | 5-11 | 8th | |
| 2011–12 | Wartburg | 11-14 | 5-11 | 7th | |
| 2012–13 | Wartburg | 15-12 | 8–6 | 4th | |
| 2013–14 | Wartburg | 13-13 | 7-7 | T–5th | |
| 2014–15 | Wartburg | 15-13 | 6-8 | 5th | |
| 2015–16 | Wartburg | 16-11 | 8-6 | T-2nd | |
| 2016–17 | Wartburg | 21-10 | 8–8 | T–5th | NCAA Sweet Sixteen |
| 2017–18 | Wartburg | 17-10 | 9-7 | T-4th | |
Wartburg Knights (American Rivers Conference) (2018–Present)
| 2018–19 | Wartburg | 17-9 | 11-5 | 3rd | |
| 2019–20 | Wartburg | 12-15 | 7-9 | T-5th | |
| 2020–21 | Wartburg | 4-7 | 2-4 | 7th | Postseason not held due to COVID-19 |
| 2021–22 | Wartburg | 16–10 | 9–7 | T–4th | |
| 2022–23 | Wartburg | 11–15 | 8–8 | 5th | |
| 2023–24 | Wartburg | 3–22 | 2–14 | T–8th | |
| Wartburg: | | 401–292 (.579) | 242–204 (.543) | | |
| Total: | | 622–415 (.600) | | | |
National champion Postseason invitational champion Conference regular season champion Conference regular season and conference tournament champion Division regular season champion Division regular season and conference tournament champion Conference tournament champion
