= NCAA Division III women's volleyball tournament =

American collegiate volleyball tournament

- Association: NCAA
- Sport: College indoor volleyball
- Founded: 1981
- Division: Division III
- Country: United States
- Most recent champion: Wisconsin–Oshkosh (1st)
- Most titles: Washington St. Louis (10)
- Broadcaster: ESPNU
- Website: NCAA.com

The NCAA Division III women's volleyball tournament is the annual event that decides the championships in women's volleyball from teams in Division III contested by the NCAA each winter since 1981 except in 2020, when all D-III championship events were canceled due to COVID-19.

Washington St. Louis is the most successful program, with ten national titles.

Wisconsin–Oshkosh are the current champions, winning their first national title in 2025.

== History ==
From 1970 through 1980, before the NCAA governed women's collegiate athletics, the Association for Intercollegiate Athletics for Women alone conducted the women's collegiate volleyball championships.

Volleyball was one of twelve women's sports added to the NCAA championship program for the 1981–82 school year, as the NCAA engaged in battle with the AIAW for sole governance of women's collegiate sports. The AIAW continued to conduct its established championship program in the same twelve (and other) sports; however, after a year of dual women's championships, the NCAA conquered the AIAW and usurped its authority and membership.

The NCAA added a Division III men's championship in 2012, which at the time was the newest NCAA-sponsored championship. That distinction has since passed to the NCAA Beach Volleyball Championship, an all-divisions women-only championship launched in 2016.

== Champions ==
- See Association for Intercollegiate Athletics for Women Champions for the Division III volleyball champions from 1979 to 1981. NOTE: In 1981 there were both NCAA and AIAW champions.

NCAA Division III Women's Volleyball Championship
Year	Site (Host Team)	Championship			Third Place Final / Semifinalists		
Year	Site (Host Team)	Champion	Games	Runner-up	Third-place	Games	Fourth-place
1981; Details	Maryville, TN (Maryville)	UC San Diego	3–2	Juniata	Occidental	3–0	Benedictine (IL)
1982; Details	La Jolla, CA (UC San Diego)	La Verne	3–1	UC San Diego	Sonoma State	3–2	Juniata
1983; Details	La Verne, CA (La Verne)	Elmhurst	3–1	UC San Diego	La Verne	3–1	MIT
1984; Details	Elmhurst, IL (Elmhurst)	UC San Diego (2)	3–0	MIT	La Verne	3–0	Calvin
1985; Details	Elmhurst, IL (Elmhurst)	Elmhurst (2)	3–0	Juniata	La Verne	3–0	UW–La Crosse
1986; Details	Grand Rapids, MI (Calvin)	UC San Diego (3)	3–2	Calvin	UW–La Crosse	3–1	Juniata
1987; Details	Elmhurst, IL (Elmhurst)	UC San Diego (4)	3–0	Elmhurst	Benedictine (IL)	3–2	Juniata
1988; Details	La Jolla, CA (UC San Diego)	UC San Diego (5)	3–2	Benedictine (IL)	Juniata	3–2	UW–Whitewater
1989; Details	St. Louis, MO (WashU)	WashU	3–0	Ohio Northern	Juniata	3–1	Menlo
1990; Details	St. Louis, MO (WashU)	UC San Diego (6)	3–2	WashU	St. Benedict	3–0	Juniata
1991; Details	St. Louis, MO (WashU)	WashU (2)	3–2	UC San Diego	Juniata	3–1	UW–Oshkosh
1992; Details	St. Louis, MO (WashU)	WashU (3)	3–0	UC San Diego	Stony Brook	3–2	Calvin
1993; Details	Huntingdon, PA (Juniata)	WashU (4)	3–0	Juniata	RIT	3–2	UC San Diego
1994; Details	Ithaca, NY (Ithaca)	WashU (5)	3–0	UW–Oshkosh	Juniata	3–2	Ithaca
1995; Details	Whitewater, WI (UW–Whitewater)	WashU (6)	3–2	Cal Lutheran	UW–Whitewater	3–2	Ithaca
1996; Details	Oshkosh, WI (UW–Oshkosh)	WashU (7)	3–0	Juniata	St. Olaf	3–1	UW–Oshkosh
1997; Details	La Jolla, CA (UC San Diego)	UC San Diego (7)	3–2	Juniata	Central (IA)	3–0	WashU
1998; Details	Huntingdon, PA (Juniata)	Central (IA)	3–2	UC San Diego	Juniata and Wellesley		
1999; Details	Huntingdon, PA (Juniata)	Central (IA) (2)	3–0	Trinity (TX)	Muskingum	3–0	Juniata
2000; Details	Pella, IA (Central)	Central (IA) (3)	3–0	UW–Whitewater	WashU	3–2	Juniata
2001; Details	Whitewater, WI (UW–Whitewater)	La Verne (2)	3–2	UW–Whitewater	Juniata	3–1	Wellesley
2002; Details	Whitewater, WI (UW–Whitewater)	UW–Whitewater	3–0	WashU	Trinity (TX)	3–0	Juniata
2003; Details	La Verne, CA (La Verne)	WashU (8)	3–0	NYU	La Verne	3–0	Emory
2004; Details	Winona, MN (St. Mary's (MN))	Juniata	3–0	WashU	La Verne	3–1	NYU
2005; Details	Salem, VA	UW–Whitewater (2)	3–0	Juniata	La Verne and Wittenberg		
2006; Details	Salem, VA	Juniata (2)	3–2	WashU	UW–Whitewater and Wittenberg		
2007; Details	Bloomington, IL (Illinois Wesleyan)	WashU (9)	3–2	UW–Whitewater	Juniata and Wittenberg		
2008; Details	Bloomington, IL (Illinois Wesleyan)	Emory	3–1	La Verne	Juniata and Ohio Northern		
2009; Details	University Heights, OH (John Carroll)	WashU (10)	3–1	Juniata	Hope and UW–Oshkosh		
2010; Details	St. Louis, MO (Washington)	Calvin	3–1	Emory	Juniata and WashU		
2011; Details	St. Louis, MO (Washington)	Wittenberg	3–0	Christopher Newport	Carthage and Eastern		
2012; Details	Holland, MI (Hope)	St. Thomas (MN)	3–2	Calvin	Christopher Newport and Elmhurst		
2013; Details	Holland, MI (Hope)	Calvin (2)	3–2	Cal Lutheran	Emory and UW–Stevens Point		
2014; Details	Newport News, VA (Christopher Newport)	Hope	3–2	Emory	Calvin and UW–Stevens Point		
2015; Details	Grand Rapids, MI (Calvin)	Cal Lutheran	3–0	Wittenberg	Carthage and Hendrix		
2016; Details	Oshkosh, WI (UW–Oshkosh)	Calvin (3)	3–0	WashU	Northwestern (MN) and Southwestern (TX)		
2017; Details	Grand Rapids, MI (Calvin)	Claremont–Mudd–Scripps	3–0	Wittenberg	Calvin and Ithaca		
2018; Details	Pittsburgh, PA (Duquesne)	Emory (2)	3–0	Calvin	Juniata and UW–Eau Claire		
2019; Details	Cedar Rapids, IA	Johns Hopkins	3–0	Emory	Carthage and Trinity (TX)		
2020; Details	Canceled due to COVID-19.						
2021; Details	Saint Louis, MO (Washington)	UW–Eau Claire	3–0	Calvin	Claremont–Mudd–Scripps and Juniata		
2022; Details	Pittsburgh, PA (Saint Vincent)	Juniata (3)	3–0	Trinity (TX)	Northwestern (MN) and NYU		
2023; Details	Claremont, CA (Claremont–Mudd–Scripps)	Juniata (4)	3–0	Hope	Claremont Scripps and NYU		
2024; Details	Salem, VA (ODAC)	Juniata (5)	3–2	UW-Whitewater	Hope and Johns Hopkins		
2025; Details	Bloomington, IL (Illinois Wesleyan)	UW–Oshkosh	3–0	La Verne	Berry and Trinity (TX)		
2026	Pittsburgh, PA						
2027	Glen Allen, VA						

=== Records ===
- Most championships: Washington University in St. Louis (10), UC San Diego (8)
- Undefeated Seasons: Washington University in St. Louis (1992), Central (IA) (1999), Johns Hopkins (2019), Juniata (2023), Juniata (2024)

== Champions ==
Team	Titles	Years
Washington University	10	1989, 1991, 1992, 1993, 1994, 1995, 1996, 2003, 2007, 2009
Juniata	5	2004, 2006, 2022, 2023, 2024
Calvin	3	2010, 2013, 2016
Central (IA)	3	1998, 1999, 2000
Emory	2	2008, 2018
Wisconsin–Whitewater	2	2002, 2005
La Verne	2	1982, 2002
Elmhurst	2	1983, 1985
Wisconsin–Oshkosh	1	2025
Wisconsin–Eau Claire	1	2021
Johns Hopkins	1	2019
Claremont–Mudd–Scripps	1	2017
Cal Lutheran	1	2015
Hope	1	2014
Wittenberg	1	2011

=== Former programs ===
Team	Titles	Years
UC San Diego	7	1981, 1984, 1986, 1987, 1988, 1990, 1997
St. Thomas (MN)	1	2012

== See also ==
- AIAW Intercollegiate Women's Volleyball Champions
- AVCA
- NCAA Women's Volleyball Championships (Division I, Division II)
- NCAA Men's Volleyball Championships (Divisions I and II, Division III)
- NAIA Volleyball Championship
