= Mendota, Illinois =

- City
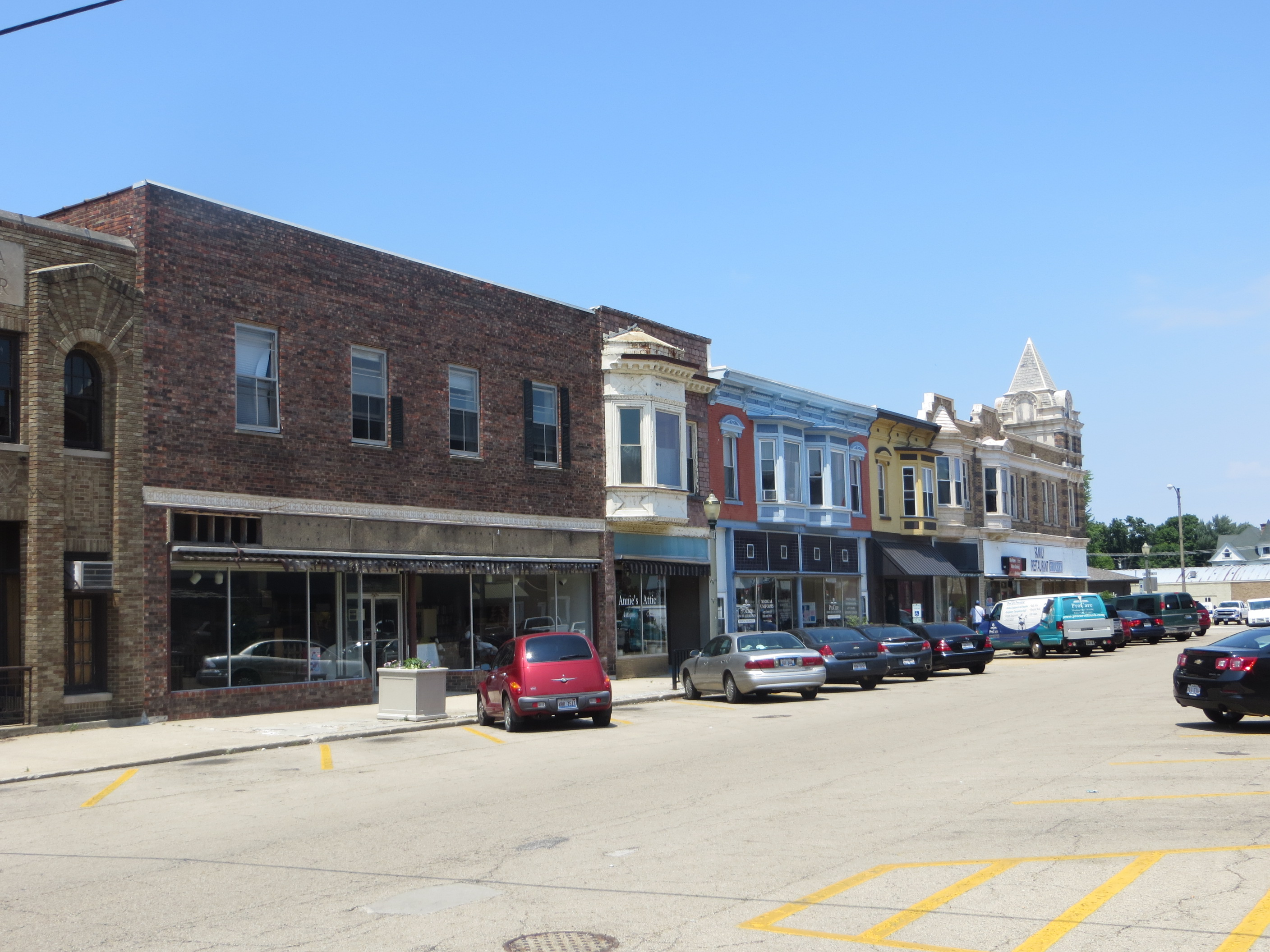
- Illinois Avenue
- Motto: The World's Greatest Little City
- Location of Mendota in LaSalle County, Illinois.

- Location within Illinois
- Coordinates: 41°33′16″N 89°07′15″W
- Country: United States
- State: Illinois
- County: LaSalle
- Incorporated: 1855

Area
  - Total: 5.15 sq mi (13.34 km^{2})
  - Land: 5.05 sq mi (13.09 km^{2})
  - Water: 0.097 sq mi (0.25 km^{2})
- Elevation: 742 ft (226 m)

Population (2020)
  - Total: 7,061
  - Density: 1,396.7/sq mi (539.25/km^{2})
- Time zone: UTC−6 (CST)
  - Summer (DST): UTC−5 (CDT)
- ZIP code: 61342
- Area code: 815, 779
- FIPS code: 17-48333
- GNIS feature ID: 2395095
- Website: Official website

Mendota is a city in LaSalle County, Illinois, United States, in the state's north-central region. The population was 7,061 at the 2020 census. It is part of the Ottawa, IL Micropolitan Statistical Area. Mendota is located approximately 85 miles (137 km) west of Chicago, 70 miles (110 km) east of Moline and 55 miles (89 km) south of Rockford. The current mayor is David W. Boelk, an independent elected to a four-year term.

The name "Mendota" is derived from a Lakota word meaning "junction of two trails", which was found appropriate for the city since there was a nearby railroad junction for the Illinois Central Railroad and the Chicago, Burlington and Quincy Railroad.

== History ==
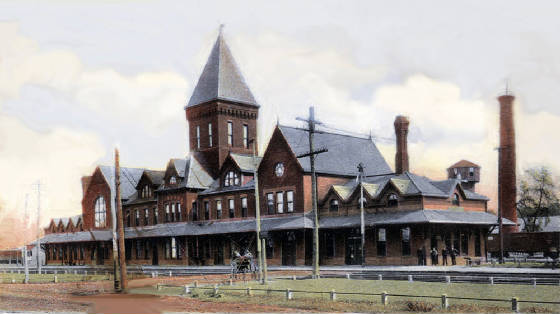
Mendota depot ca.1898

In summer of 1853, the Illinois Central Railroad was completed and crossed the existing Chicago and Aurora Railroad. The Chicago, Burlington and Quincy Railroad completed the crossing at the present site of Mendota. By the following year, the population had grown to more than 1,000 and the town was home to saloons, hotels, and various shops. The town was incorporated as a village in 1855 and reincorporated as a town in 1859. By 1860, the town was also home to churches of 5 denominations.

With the availability of the railroads to facilitate export, several manufactures of items ranging from organs to cigars and buttons opened factories in Mendota. By the end of the American Civil War, the population of the town had more than doubled to over 2,000. By winter of 1866, citizens voted on a referendum to secure a city government. Mendota was incorporated into its current city government on April 9, 1867.

A library was opened on September 8, 1874, with 1700 books secured by donation. It was acquired by the city government in 1894. The original building was replaced in 1905 by a new Carnegie Library.

A new Union station was opened on February 23, 1888, to replace the Passenger House, which was the original depot that had burned down in 1885. The new building contained a hotel, restaurants, and separate waiting areas for passengers and railroad staff. Because of falling revenue and ridership, much of the station was torn down in 1942. The current Mendota station is the only remaining portion of the original structure.

== Geography ==
According to the 2010 census, Mendota has a total area of 5.096 square miles (13.20 km^{2}), of which 5 square miles (12.95 km^{2}) (or 98.12%) is land and 0.096 square miles (0.25 km^{2}) (or 1.88%) is water.

Mendota Creek, a south flowing tributary of the Little Vermilion River, flows through downtown Mendota from its headwaters in the agricultural fields northwest of town. The creek was identified in 2014 as having chronic problems with dissolved oxygen and fecal coliform bacteria concentrations.

== Demographics ==
Historical population
Census	Pop.	Note	%±
1860	1,934		—
1870	3,546		83.4%
1880	4,142		16.8%
1890	3,542		−14.5%
1900	3,736		5.5%
1910	3,806		1.9%
1920	3,934		3.4%
1930	4,008		1.9%
1940	4,215		5.2%
1950	5,129		21.7%
1960	6,154		20.0%
1970	6,902		12.2%
1980	7,134		3.4%
1990	7,018		−1.6%
2000	7,272		3.6%
2010	7,372		1.4%
2020	7,061		−4.2%
U.S. Decennial Census

=== 2020 census ===
As of the 2020 census, Mendota had a population of 7,061. The population density was 1,370.54 inhabitants per square mile (529.17/km^{2}). The median age was 40.0 years. 24.1% of residents were under the age of 18 and 20.4% of residents were 65 years of age or older. For every 100 females there were 92.4 males, and for every 100 females age 18 and over there were 89.8 males age 18 and over.

97.9% of residents lived in urban areas, while 2.1% lived in rural areas.

There were 2,825 households and 1,921 families in Mendota, of which 30.1% of households had children under the age of 18 living in them. Of all households, 44.5% were married-couple households, 18.5% were households with a male householder and no spouse or partner present, and 29.9% were households with a female householder and no spouse or partner present. About 32.1% of all households were made up of individuals and 16.5% had someone living alone who was 65 years of age or older.

There were 3,099 housing units at an average density of 601.51 per square mile (232.24/km^{2}). Of all housing units, 8.8% were vacant. The homeowner vacancy rate was 1.3% and the rental vacancy rate was 11.4%.

Racial composition as of the 2020 census
Race	Number	Percent
White	5,183	73.4%
Black or African American	99	1.4%
American Indian and Alaska Native	72	1.0%
Asian	65	0.9%
Native Hawaiian and Other Pacific Islander	4	0.1%
Some other race	843	11.9%
Two or more races	795	11.3%
Hispanic or Latino (of any race)	2,081	29.5%

=== Income and poverty ===
The median income for a household in the city was $58,974, and the median income for a family was $65,985. Males had a median income of $43,926 versus $26,643 for females. The per capita income for the city was $30,470. About 5.9% of families and 11.2% of the population were below the poverty line, including 14.9% of those under age 18 and 4.2% of those age 65 or over.

== Economy ==
A number of businesses operate within Mendota including :

- Archer Daniels Midland (ADM), a grain processor.
- Del Monte, a food processing company. The Del Monte plant was slated to close at the end of the 2019 packing season, until a buyer was found later that year. The purchase is set to be completed in spring 2020.

== Arts and culture ==
The Mendota Sweet Corn Festival attracts thousands of visitors each August; it features a parade, carnival, beer garden with live bands, free sweet corn cooked in a vintage steam engine, and other special events. The city closes down several streets in the downtown area to host the annual event which is sponsored by Del Monte company . The Mendota Tri-County Fair is held every Labor Day weekend at the Mendota Fairgrounds. The fair hosts a carnival, beer garden, and several other events.

=== Museums ===
The Hume-Carnegie Museum showcases artifacts of local history, including items manufactured in Mendota and a small collection pertaining to Wild Bill Hickok, who was born in nearby Troy Grove. It is located in a former Carnegie library building in Veteran's Park.

The Union Depot Railroad Museum houses the current Amtrak station, several rooms of vintage railroad artifacts, passenger train cars from the 1930s and 1940s. It is also home to CB&Q No. 4978, a 2-8-2 class Locomotive built in September 1923 by Baldwin Locomotive Works.

The Breaking the Prairie Museum is a small barn replica showcasing a rotating display with one large item (a vintage tractor or large item of farm husbandry) and several smaller items. Adjacent to the barn is "The Country Chapel", a small church which is owned by the museum. Completed in 2004, it houses a restored pump organ from the 1880s. It is closed to the public, however special tours can be arranged by contacting the Mendota Historical Society Office.

== Parks and recreation ==
The city has two man made lakes, Lake Mendota and Lake Kakusha, used for boating and fishing. Mendota also maintains a community swimming pool as well as several parks including Snyders Grove, a 104-acre (0.42 km^{2}) reserve/park.

== Education ==
Mendota has four public schools and one private school. The three public grade schools: Blackstone, Lincoln, and Northbrook are part of Mendota Consolidated Community School District 289; while the Mendota Township High School is district 280. Blackstone School houses kindergarten and first grade, and had an enrollment of 271 students in 2010. Lincoln School houses second through fourth grades, and had a student enrollment of 391 in 2010. Northbrook School is home to the fifth through eighth grades, as well as pre-kindergarten; and had an enrollment of 644 in 2010. The student enrollment of the high school in 2010 was 611 students. A new high school facility was built in 2002 at 2300 Main Street (U.S. Route 52). Holy Cross Roman Catholic Parish has a private school which educates students from pre-kindergarten through eighth grade.

Aurora University was originally chartered as Mendota College on the north side of Mendota where the high school was located from 1917 to 2003.

Wartburg College (now located in Waverly, Iowa) was located in Mendota from 1875 to 1885.

== Media ==
Mendota has one weekly newspaper, The Mendota Reporter

Mendota has two commercialized radio stations.

FM radio stations
Frequency	Call sign	Name	Format	Owner	City
100.1 FM	WGLC-FM	World's Greatest Little City	Country music	Studstill Media	Mendota, Illinois
102.9 FM	WMKB		Classic Rock	KM Broadcasting	Earlville, Illinois

== Infrastructure ==
=== Transportation ===
Mendota is served by U.S. Interstate 39, U.S. Route 34, U.S. Route 52, and many state highways including Illinois Route 251. Three Amtrak trains in each direction stop daily at the Mendota Amtrak station: the Illinois Zephyr and Carl Sandburg between Chicago and Quincy, and the Southwest Chief from Chicago to Kansas City and Los Angeles. (The California Zephyr passes through without stopping.) There are also two small airports near-by.

== Notable people ==
- William P. Bettendorf, inventor; city of Bettendorf, Iowa named for him
- Bill Brown, former running back with the Minnesota Vikings
- Helen E. Hokinson, cartoonist for The New Yorker (1925–1949)
- Ray Jauch, running back for national champion 1958 Iowa Hawkeyes football team
- James Massey, cryptographer; lived in Mendota
- Jason Pohl, motorcycle designer with Orange County Choppers; born in Mendota
- Frank Seno, NFL running and defensive back for the Washington Redskins and Chicago Cardinals
- Chase J. Sexton, professional motocross rider with KTM and Honda HRC; born in Mendota
- David C. Shapiro, dentist and Illinois state legislator; born in Mendota
- Jim Troupis, indicted for 2020 fake presidential elector conspiracy in Wisconsin; was also mayor of Mendota (1985–1987)
- Otto Vogel, outfielder for the Chicago Cubs; born in Mendota
- Deacon White, professional baseball pioneer in Hall of Fame; lived in Mendota
