= Wartburg College =

Lutheran college in Waverly, Iowa, US

Coordinates: 42.72911°N 92.48197°W

- Motto: Experience more.
- Type: Private liberal arts college
- Established: 1852; 174 years ago
- Religious affiliation: Evangelical Lutheran Church in America
- Endowment: $110.7 million (2025)
- President: Rebecca Ehretsman
- Faculty: 83 full-time and 60 part-time (fall 2022)
- Students: 1,563 fall 2022
- Location: Waverly, Iowa, United States
- Campus: Rural, 118 acres (48 ha)
- Colors: Orange and black
- Nickname: Knights
- Website: wartburg.edu
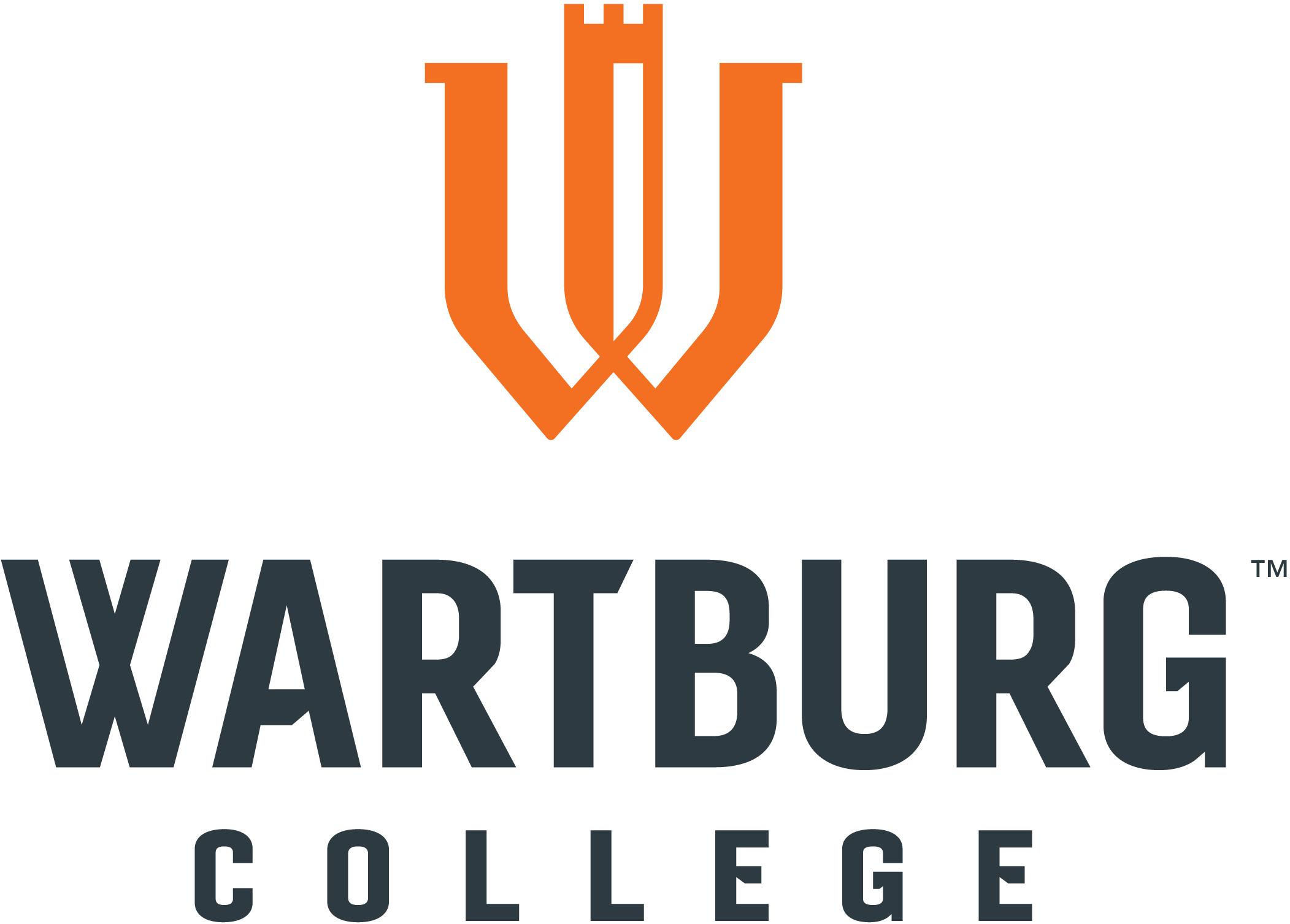

Wartburg College is a private Lutheran liberal arts college in Waverly, Iowa.

== History ==
Wartburg College was founded in 1852 in Saginaw, Michigan, by Georg M. Grossmann, a native of Neuendettelsau, Bavaria. Pastor Wilhelm Löhe sent Grossmann to establish a pastor training school for German immigrants. The college moved many times between Illinois and Iowa before settling in Waverly in 1935. Also in 1935, St. Paul Luther College in Saint Paul, Minnesota, merged with Wartburg College.

The college is named after Wartburg Castle in Eisenach, Germany, where Martin Luther was protected during the stormy days of the Reformation. While in the Castle, he translated the New Testament from its original Greek into German, the language of the people. Student and alumni groups often travel to the castle, and the Wartburg Choir has performed there several times. Waverly and Eisenach are sister towns and often swap foreign exchange students. The college is proud of its German heritage and celebrates an annual student-declared one-day holiday, Outfly, a deliberately mistaken translation of the German noun Ausflug. Outfly is the most enduring Wartburg tradition. The first mention of Ausflug comes from Mendota, Illinois, in 1883, when students went on a Friday-Saturday excursion to nearby Starved Rock, now a state park. Faculty minutes for October 5, 1892, note that Ausflug was scheduled for the next day.

Old Main, the oldest building on campus, was built in 1880 for the Wartburg Teachers Seminary. It was added to the National Register of Historic Places in 1978 under the name Wartburg Teachers' Seminary.

The longstanding rivalry between Wartburg and Luther College in Decorah, Iowa, has produced some colorful moments. The rivalry's origins are unclear. Stories of pranks date to the 1940s. For the most part, the rivalry has been characterized by fun and good sportsmanship. It rose to new heights in October 1996, when two Wartburg cross-country runners rented a light plane, flew to Decorah, and dropped leaflets on the Luther campus. The incident was reported in every major Iowa newspaper, got national mention on Fox, and made Rolling Stone magazine's list of the most memorable college pranks of 1996–97. The creativity in the rivalry continued when student staff members of the college radio station, KWAR, secretly entered a float in the Luther College Homecoming Parade. The staff members decorated the float as an environmental club, the "Organization of Nature Enthusiasts", from Luther College. In front of the judges' stand the float quickly changed color from blue and white to orange and black. It continued all the way through town and onto Luther's campus, with numerous Wartburg students joining the procession from the crowd.

In 2022, Rebecca Ehretsman became Wartburg's first female president.

=== List of presidents ===
- Georg M. Grossmann, 1852–1868
- John Klindworth, 1868–1875
- Georg Grossmann, 1878–1894
- Friedrich Lutz, 1894–1905
- Gerhard Bergstraesser, 1905–1909
- Friedrich Richter, 1894–1899 (Clinton IA)
- Otto Kraushaar, 1899–1907 (Clinton IA)
- John Fritschel, 1907–1919 (Clinton IA)
- Otto Proehl, 1919–1935 (Clinton IA)
- August Engelbrecht, 1909–1933
- Edward J. Braulick, 1935–1945
- Conrad Becker, 1945–1964
- John Bachman, 1964–1974
- William Jellema, 1974–1980
- Robert L. Vogel, 1980–1998
- Jack R. Ohle, 1998–2008
- William Hamm, 2008–2009 (interim)
- Darrel Colson, 2009–2022
- Rebecca Ehretsman, 2022–Present

== Location ==
Wartburg College has moved many times throughout its history:

- Saginaw, Michigan (1852–1853)
- Dubuque, Iowa (1853–1857)
- St. Sebald, Iowa (1857–1868)
- Galena, Illinois (1868–1875)
- Mendota, Illinois (1875–1885)
- Clinton, Iowa (1894–1935)
- Waverly, Iowa (1879–1933, 1935–present)

== Academics ==
The college library houses the Archives of Iowa Broadcasting, which includes recordings and oral histories from several of the state's radio and television stations.

== Athletics ==
Logo of the school athletics team Wartburg Knights

Wartburg College teams participate as a member of the National Collegiate Athletic Association's Division III. The Knights are a member of the American Rivers Conference (ARC). Men's sports include baseball, basketball, cross country, football, golf, soccer, tennis, track & field, and wrestling; while women's sports include basketball, cheerleading, cross country, dance team, golf, soccer, softball, tennis, track & field, volleyball, wrestling, and lacrosse. The women's lacrosse team competes in the Midwest Women's Lacrosse Conference (MWLC). In the spring of 2012, Wartburg's wrestling and women's track and field teams led Wartburg to become the only school in NCAA history to win two national team championships on the same day. Wartburg has had an individual or team national champion for 28 straight years including men's wrestling winning the 2022 NCAA DIII Wrestling Tournament. The men's wrestling team has an NCAA DIII leading 15 NCAA national titles. Wartburg's softball team appeared in two Women's College World Series in 1971 and 2003, while the baseball team has also played in two College World Series, coming in 2000 and 2005.

=== Notable coaches ===
- Bob Amsberry, head women's basketball coach, 2006–present
- Joel Holst, head baseball coach, 1996–2022
- Eric Keller, head wrestling coach, 2011–present
- Casey Klunder, head baseball coach, 2023–present
- Sam Leal, head men's basketball coach, 2024–present
- Jamie Mueller, head softball coach, 2016–present
- Dick Peth, head men's basketball coach, 1997–2024
- Rick Willis, head football coach, 1997–2005 and 2008–2021
- Chris Winter, head football coach, 2021–present

== Notable alumni ==
- Don Denkinger, professional baseball umpire
- Matt Entz, college football coach
- Romaine H Foege, politician
- Mark Holtz, professional baseball radio announcer
- Dan Ige, professional mixed martial artist
- Rachelle Keck, academic administrator
- Sarah Lacina, television gameshow contestant
- Bob Nielson, college football coach
- Tiffany Pins, college soccer coach
- Coleen Rowley, FBI agent
- Jack Salzwedel, insurance executive
- Paul Schell, politician
- Brian Trow, businessman and television personality
- Chris Winter, college football coach
- George J. Woerth, politician
- Tom Zirbel, professional bicycle racer
- Landon Williams, college wrestling coach
