= Midwest Collegiate Volleyball League =

- Association: NCAA
- Founded: March 13, 2014
- Commissioner: Chuck Yrigoyen (since 2016)
- Sports fielded: Men's volleyball
- Division: Division III
- No. of teams: 11 (12 in 2027)
- Headquarters: Cedar Rapids, Iowa
- Region: Midwest
- Website: MCVL.org

The Midwest Collegiate Volleyball League (MCVL) is an intercollegiate men's volleyball conference associated with the NCAA's Division III.

== History ==
The MCVL was founded in March 2014 by an amicable split of the Continental Volleyball Conference (CVC), which itself had only been created in 2011. The CVC's six Midwestern schools, which had previously formed a CVC division, wished to create a more geographically compact league. The two groups agreed that the CVC's eastern teams would retain the CVC name and branding. Since the CVC retained six members, that group also retained its automatic berth in the Division III national championship. It was also agreed that two Midwestern schools that were adding the sport for 2014–15 (2015 season) and had been announced as incoming CVC members, Benedictine University and Loras College, would instead join the new Midwestern league. The next month, the new league was unveiled as the MCVL.

In September 2014, two Illinois schools that were adding volleyball in the 2015–16 school year (2016 season), Greenville College (now Greenville University) and North Central College, were accepted as the league's 9th and 10th members. Three months later, four additional schools—Adrian College, Marian University of Wisconsin, Olivet College, and Wittenberg University—were announced as new members for 2015–16.

The MCVL was not eligible for an automatic berth in the Division III national championship in its first two seasons (2015 and 2016); during that time, its teams were eligible for at-large berths.

In January 2017, the Northern Athletics Collegiate Conference (NACC), the all-sports home of five MCVL members—charter members Benedictine, Dominican University of Illinois, Lakeland College of Wisconsin (now Lakeland University) and the Milwaukee School of Engineering (MSOE), plus 2015 arrival Marian—announced that it would begin sponsoring men's volleyball in the 2018 season. This followed previous announcements that NACC members Aurora University and Concordia University Wisconsin would launch varsity men's volleyball in that season, giving the NACC seven men's volleyball schools and an automatic berth in the Division III national championship. As a result, the MCVL initially dropped to nine members for the 2018 season. Before that season, the MCVL returned to 10 members with the addition of Augustana College of Illinois, which was set to begin sponsoring varsity men's volleyball in the 2018 season. Augustana had intended to begin varsity play as an independent with a view toward eventually gaining MCVL membership, but was immediately accepted into the league.

After the 2018 season, the MCVL lost one member and gained another. Wittenberg left to become a single-sport affiliate in the Allegheny Mountain Collegiate Conference, while Trine University resurrected a varsity program that last played in 2002 and joined the MCVL.

The MCVL lost half of its 2019 membership when the College Conference of Illinois and Wisconsin (CCIW) added men's volleyball for the 2020 season. Augustana, Carthage, Greenville, Loras, and North Central, along with new programs at North Park and Millikin, began CCIW conference play in 2020. Greenville and Loras were accepted into the CCIW as associate members. This temporarily left the MCVL in danger of eventually losing its automatic bid to the NCAA championship, but the league restored its membership to the six needed to maintain its automatic bid by adding the University of Mount Union, which had spent its inaugural men's volleyball season of 2019 as an independent, for the 2020 season.

Three schools became members in advance of the 2021 season. Wittenberg returned to the MCVL after a two-year absence, and the league added the new varsity programs of Baldwin Wallace University and Wabash College.

The league's next expansion took place after the 2023 season with the arrival of Calvin University, which started a new varsity men's volleyball program. When the MCVL announced Calvin's arrival, it announced a two-year moratorium on the addition of any further members. Fontbonne announced in March 2024 that it would close after the 2024–25 school year, and later announced it would not field a men's volleyball team in the 2025 season. With the departure of Fontbonne, and the moratorium on new members set to expire after the 2025 season, the MCVL announced that Spalding University would join the conference for the school's first season of varsity men's volleyball in 2026. The MCVL added another member for the 2027 season with the arrival of Franklin College, previously a men's volleyball independent.

== Current members ==
The league was founded with eight members. Six joined for the 2016 season, five left after the 2017 season, and one joined for the 2018 season. The 2019 season saw the conference membership remain at 10, with one departing member replaced by a new school. After the 2019 season five teams left and Mount Union was added, dropping the league to six members for the 2020 season. The league returned to nine members for the 2021 season with the return of Wittenberg and the addition of new programs at Baldwin Wallace and Wabash, and returned to 10 for the 2024 season with the addition of another new program at Calvin. The impending closure of Fontbonne dropped the membership to nine members for 2025, and the addition of Spalding again returned the membership to 10 in 2026. Franklin's arrival for the 2027 season expands the membership to 11. All current and former conference members are private institutions.

The conference formed Eastern and Western Divisions for the 2017 season, but reverted to a single-table format following the departure of the five NACC members.

Note that because NCAA men's volleyball is a spring sport, the year of joining is the calendar year before the first year of competition, and the year of departure for former members coincides with the final season of MCVL competition.

Institution	Location	Founded	Joined	Affiliation	Enrollment	Nickname	Primary conference
Adrian College	Adrian, Michigan	1859	2015	United Methodist Church	1,654	Bulldogs	MIAA
Baldwin Wallace University	Berea, Ohio	1845	2020	Non-sectarian	4,177	Yellow Jackets	OAC
Calvin University	Grand Rapids, Michigan	1876	2023	Christian Reformed	3,746	Knights	MIAA
Franklin College	Franklin, Indiana	1834	2026	American Baptist Churches USA	966	Grizzlies	HCAC
Mount St. Joseph University	Delhi Township, Ohio (Note: Mailing address is Cincinnati.)	1920	2014	Catholic – Sisters of Charity of Cincinnati	2,225	Lions	HCAC
University of Mount Union	Alliance, Ohio	1846	2019	Non-sectarian	2,309	Purple Raiders	OAC
University of Olivet	Olivet, Michigan	1844	2015	United Church of Christ and National Association of Congregational Christian Churches	1,145	Comets	MIAA
Spalding University	Louisville, Kentucky	1814	2025	Catholic – Sisters of Charity of Nazareth	1,532	Golden Eagles	SLIAC
Trine University	Angola, Indiana	1884	2018	Non-sectarian	2,000	Thunder	MIAA
Wabash College	Crawfordsville, Indiana	1884	2020	Non-sectarian	882	Little Giants	NCAC
Wittenberg University	Springfield, Ohio	1845	2015, 2020 (Note: Wittenberg first joined in 2015, left in 2018, and returned in 2020.)	Lutheran – ELCA	2,050	Tigers	NCAC

== Future members ==
Institution	Location	Founded	Joining	Affiliation	Enrollment	Nickname	Primary conference
John Carroll University	University Heights, Ohio	1886	2027	Catholic – Jesuits	2,615	Blue Streaks	NCAC

== Former members ==
School names and nicknames reflect those used in the final season of MCVL membership.

Institution	Location	Joined	Left	Affiliation	Nickname	Current volleyball conference
Augustana College	Rock Island, Illinois	2017	2019	Lutheran – ELCA	Vikings	CCIW
Benedictine University	Lisle, Illinois	2014	2017	Catholic – Benedictine	Eagles	NACC
Carthage College	Kenosha, Wisconsin	2014	2019	Lutheran – ELCA	Red Men (Note: "Red Men" dropped after the 2019–20 school year; new nickname of Firebirds adopted in February 2021.)	CCIW
Dominican University	River Forest, Illinois	2014	2017	Catholic – Dominican	Stars	NACC
Fontbonne University	St. Louis, Missouri	2014	2024	Catholic – Sisters of St. Joseph of Carondelet	Griffins	N/A (Note: Dropped men's volleyball in 2024 in advance of the university's closure in 2025.)
Greenville University	Greenville, Illinois	2015	2019	Free Methodist Church	Panthers	Independent (Note: Dropped men's volleyball in 2020; reinstated program in the 2025 season as a Division III independent.)
Lakeland University	Sheboygan, Wisconsin	2014	2017	United Church of Christ	Muskies	NACC
Loras College	Dubuque, Iowa	2014	2019	Catholic – Diocesan	Duhawks	CCIW
Marian University	Fond du Lac, Wisconsin	2015	2017	Catholic – Congregation of Sisters of Saint Agnes	Sabres	NACC
Milwaukee School of Engineering (MSOE)	Milwaukee, Wisconsin	2014	2017	Nonsectarian	Raiders	NACC
North Central College	Naperville, Illinois	2015	2019	United Methodist Church	Cardinals	CCIW

== Championship history ==
Season	Regular season	Tournament
2015	Carthage	Carthage
2016	Carthage	Carthage
2017	Dominican (East); Carthage (West)	Dominican
2018	North Central	Carthage
2019	Carthage	Fontbonne
2020	Season canceled in progress due to the COVID-19 pandemic	
2021	Fontbonne	Fontbonne
2022	Fontbonne	Mount Union
2023	Mount Union	Baldwin Wallace
2024	Wittenberg	Trine
2025	Mount Union	Mount Union
2026	Trine, Wittenberg	Wittenberg

== Membership timeline ==
As noted previously, the year of joining is the calendar year before the first season of competition.
