= Continental Volleyball Conference =

US intercollegiate men's volleyball conference

- Association: NCAA
- Founded: April 4, 2011
- Commissioner: JJ Nekoloff
- Sports fielded: 1
- Division: Division III
- No. of teams: 5
- Headquarters: Madison, New Jersey
- Website: TheCVC.org

The Continental Volleyball Conference is an intercollegiate men's volleyball conference associated with the NCAA's Division III.

== History ==
On April 4, 2011, Gary Williams, Associate Athletic Director of Carthage College announced in Milwaukee the formation of the Continental Volleyball Conference. The league was established as a direct result of the launch of the NCAA Men's Division III Volleyball Championship in the next school year of 2011–12 where the inaugural tournament was held in April 2012.

With the continued growth of Division III men's volleyball, the CVC announced in March 2014 that it would split into two leagues after the 2014 season. The league's six Eastern members retained the CVC name and branding, while the six Midwestern members, plus two other Midwestern schools that had been announced as incoming CVC members, formed a new men's volleyball conference that was later unveiled as the Midwest Collegiate Volleyball League (MCVL). When the split was announced, the eastern members also added Rutgers–Newark, a Division III school which had previously played at the National Collegiate (Division I/II) level as a "grandfathered" scholarship-granting program, for the 2015 season.

The conference added the newly launched men's volleyball program of Alvernia as its eighth member for the 2017 season.

Further membership changes were announced in 2016. First, on October 12, the Middle Atlantic Conferences, whose Commonwealth Conference was the all-sports home of charter CVC member Stevenson and new CVC member Alvernia, announced that its Middle Atlantic Conference would begin sponsoring men's volleyball in the 2018 season, leading to the departure of those schools from the CVC. Within a week of this development, the CVC announced that Kean, Neumann, and Southern Virginia would become new members for the 2018 season, and that Thiel would leave after that same season. Then, on November 21, Ramapo was announced as an incoming member for the 2018 season.

Thiel did not initially announce its future men's volleyball affiliation, but would eventually be revealed as a new affiliate member of the Allegheny Mountain Collegiate Conference effective with the 2018–19 school year.

While Thiel left after the 2018 season, the CVC added three new members for the 2019 season, all of which launched new varsity programs at that time. First, in October 2017, Randolph–Macon College was announced as an incoming member. Then, in December of that year, the CVC announced that Elizabethtown College and Immaculata University would also join.

On July 1, 2018, the New Jersey Athletic Conference announced they would add men's volleyball as a sponsored sport. Kean and Rutgers–Newark maintain dual membership in the CVC and NJAC starting in 2018–19. Ramapo College left the CVC and returned to the Skyline Conference; Rampo maintains dual affiliation for men's volleyball in the NJAC and Skyline.

Inaugural member Cairn departed the conference for the 2019–20 academic year after the university's all-sport conference, the Colonial States Athletic Conference, announced the addition of men's volleyball as a conference sport. The CVC added another member when Roanoke College announced the addition of men's volleyball for the 2022 season.

With the addition of men's volleyball in the Old Dominion Athletic Conference, Eastern Mennonite, Randolph-Macon, and Roanoke departed the CVC after the 2024 season to participate in men's volleyball competition in their home conference.

Five more members are set to depart after the 2026 season. Drew, Elizabethtown, Juniata, and Wilkes will move men's volleyball to their primary home of the Landmark Conference, which will begin sponsoring the sport in the 2027 season, with Kean joining them as an affiliate member in that sport.

== Member schools ==
=== Current members ===
The league currently has 5 full members.

Note that because NCAA men's volleyball is a spring sport, the year of joining is the calendar year before the first season of competition.

Institution	Location	Founded	Joined	Type	Enrollment	Nickname	Primary conference
Regent University	Virginia Beach, Virginia	1977	2026	Private	10,657	Royals	C2C
Rutgers University–Newark	Newark, New Jersey	1936 (Note: Rutgers University as a whole was founded in 1766. The founding date in this table reflects that of the University of Newark, which was merged into Rutgers in 1946 and became the current Rutgers–Newark campus.)	2014	Public	12,011	Scarlet Raiders	NJAC (Note: Dual Member of CVC and NJAC for Men's Volleyball.)
Southern Virginia University	Buena Vista, Virginia	1867	2017	Private	1,106	Knights	USA South
Warren Wilson College	Swannanoa, North Carolina	1894	2026	Private	791	Owls	C2C
William Peace University	Raleigh, North Carolina	1857	2026	Private	950	Pacers	USA South

=== Former members ===
School names and nicknames reflect those in use during the final season each school was a CVC member.

Institution	Location	Joined	Left	Type	Nickname	Current volleyball conference
Alvernia University	Reading, Pennsylvania	2016	2017	Private	Crusaders	MAC
Cairn University (Note: Cairn was known as Philadelphia Biblical University until July 2012.)	Langhorne, Pennsylvania	2011	2019	Private	Crimson Eagles	United East
Carthage College	Kenosha, Wisconsin	2011	2014	Private	Redmen	CCIW
Dominican University	River Forest, Illinois	2013	2014	Private	Stars	NACC
Drew University	Madison, New Jersey	2025	2026	Private	Rangers	Landmark
Eastern Mennonite University	Harrisonburg, Virginia	2011	2024	Private	Royals	ODAC
Elizabethtown College	Elizabethtown, Pennsylvania	2018	2026	Private	Blue Jays	Landmark
Fontbonne University	St. Louis, Missouri	2011	2014	Private	Griffins	N/A (Note: Fontbonne dropped men's volleyball after the 2024 season in advance of the university's 2025 closure.)
Immaculata University	Malvern, Pennsylvania	2018	2022	Private	Mighty Macs	United East
Juniata College	Huntingdon, Pennsylvania	2011	2026	Private	Eagles	Landmark
Kean University	Union, New Jersey	2017	2026	Public	Cougars	Landmark
Lakeland College (Note: Known as Lakeland University since July 2016.)	Sheboygan, Wisconsin	2013	2014	Private	Muskies	NACC
Marymount University	Arlington, Virginia	2013	2026	Private	Saints	United East
College of Mount St. Joseph (Note: Known as Mount St. Joseph University since July 2014.)	Delhi Township, Ohio (Note: The campus mailing address is Cincinnati.)	2011 (Note: Mount St. Joseph fielded a team in the CVC's first season of 2012. It did not field a team in 2013, but returned for 2014.)	2014	Private	Lions	MCVL
Milwaukee School of Engineering	Milwaukee, Wisconsin	2011	2014	Private	Raiders	NACC
Neumann University	Aston, Pennsylvania	2017	2020	Private	Knights	United East (MAC in 2026)
Ramapo College	Mahwah, New Jersey	2017	2019	Public	Roadrunners	NJAC, Skyline (Note: Dual Member of Skyline NJAC for Men's Volleyball.)
Randolph-Macon College	Ashland, Virginia	2018	2024	Private	Yellow Jackets	ODAC
Roanoke College	Salem, Virginia	2021	2024	Private	Maroons	ODAC
Stevenson University	Owings Mills, Maryland	2011	2017	Private	Mustangs	MAC
Thiel College	Greenville, Pennsylvania	2011	2018	Private	Tomcats	AMCC
University of California, Santa Cruz	Santa Cruz, California	2011	2013	Public	Banana Slugs	Independent
Wilkes University	Wilkes-Barre, Pennsylvania	2025	2026	Private	Colonels	Landmark

In addition to the above schools, two other institutions that were adding men's volleyball for the 2014–15 school year (2015 season): Benedictine University in Illinois and Loras College in Iowa—had been announced as new CVC members. They never officially joined the CVC, instead uniting with the six Midwestern CVC schools in the MCVL. (Note: Benedictine left once its all-sports home of the Northern Athletics Collegiate Conference began sponsoring men's volleyball in 2017–18, while Loras left the MCVL in 2019 for single-sport membership in the College Conference of Illinois and Wisconsin, which added men's volleyball for 2019–20 and beyond.)

=== Membership timeline ===
As noted previously, the year of joining is the calendar year before the first season of competition.

== Conference Tournament Champions ==
Season	Champion	Record
2012	UC Santa Cruz	17-7
2013	Juniata	24-12
2014	Juniata	29-5
2015	Rutgers-Newark	22-10
2016	Stevenson	26-8
2017	Juniata	22-11
2018	Kean	34-3
2019	Southern Virginia	23-4
2020	Canceled due to the COVID-19 pandemic	
2021	Southern Virginia	16-4
2022	Rutgers-Newark	23-4
2023	Juniata	30-3
2024	Southern Virginia	29-1
2025	Southern Virginia	35-1

=== League titles by school ===
School	Championships	Championship years
Juniata	4	2013, 2014, 2017, 2023
Southern Virginia	4	2019, 2021, 2024, 2025
Rutgers-Newark	2	2015, 2022
Kean	1	2018
Stevenson	1	2016
UC Santa Cruz	1	2012
