= Midwest Collegiate Conference =

- Formerly: Midwest Catholic Conference (1988–1989); Midwest Classic Conference (1989–2007)
- Association: NAIA
- Founded: 1988
- Folded: 2015
- Sports fielded: 15; men's: 7; women's: 8
- No. of teams: 7 (final), 12 (total)
- Region: Midwestern United States; Region VII

Locations
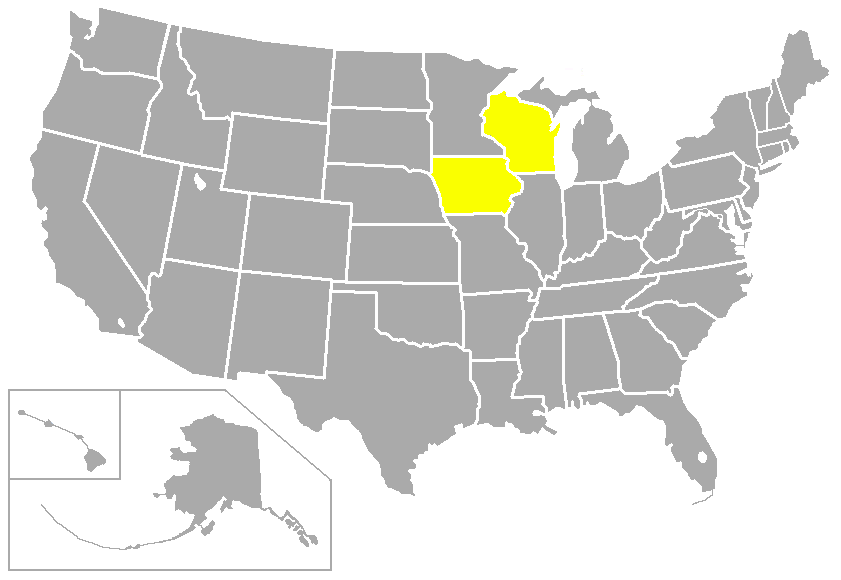

The Midwest Collegiate Conference (MCC) was a college athletic conference, consisting of colleges and universities located in Iowa and Wisconsin. Founded in 1988, the conference's member schools competed at the NAIA level in 15 different sports.

== History ==
When the Midwest Collegiate Conference was originally formed in 1988, it consisted of six Roman Catholic colleges and universities situated across the Midwestern United States. Dubbed the Midwest Catholic Conference, member schools originally competed in only men's and women's basketball, women's volleyball, and men's soccer.

The charter members of the conference were Clarke College, Edgewood College, Marycrest University, Mount Mercy College, Mount St. Clare College and Viterbo College. Edgewood left the conference before the start of the 1989–90 season. With the inclusion of Grand View College that year, the conference changed its name to the Midwest Classic Conference.

St. Ambrose University's basketball teams joined the conference for the 1990 season, and the school's other sports joined the MCC in 1991. Iowa Wesleyan College joined the conference for the 1995–96 season. The following year, Clarke University left the MCC to participate in NCAA Division III athletics. William Penn University became a member of the Conference in 2001. Marycrest International University ceased operations after the 2001–02 season. Waldorf College joined the conference for the 2003–04 season, completing the nine-school lineup. Clarke University returned to the conference in 2007, and the MCC officially took the name of the Midwest Collegiate Conference.

Midwest Classic Conference logo

Members Ashford University and Waldorf College were voted out of the conference on May 17, 2011, with effect at the end of the 2011–12 season. On October 14, 2011, Iowa Wesleyan College announced they would join National Collegiate Athletic Association's Division III. On January 10, 2014, Grand View University and William Penn University announced they would join the Heart of America Athletic Conference after the 2014–15 season. On February 5, 2015, AIB College of Business announced they would end their athletic programs as the school prepared to be coming a part of the University of Iowa.

=== Chronological timeline ===
- 1988 – The Midwest Collegiate Conference (MCC) was founded as the Midwest Catholic Conference (MCC). Charter members included Clarke College (now Clarke University), Edgewood College (now Edgewood University), Marycrest University (later Marycrest International University), Mount Mercy College (now Mount Mercy University), Mount St. Clare College (later Ashford University) and Viterbo College (now Viterbo University), beginning the 1988–89 academic year.
- 1989 – Edgewood left the Midwest Catholic after spending just one season, only to fully align in the Division III ranks of the National Collegiate Athletic Association (NCAA) and the Lake Michigan Conference after the 1988–89 academic year.
- 1989 – Grand View College (now Grand View University) joined the Midwest Catholic in the 1989–90 academic year.
- 1989 – The MCC has been renamed as the Midwest Classic Conference (MCC) in the 1989-90 academic year.
- 1990 – St. Ambrose College (now St. Ambrose University) joined the Midwest Classic (with the rest of their other sports joining the following season) in the 1990–91 academic year.
- 1995 – Iowa Wesleyan College (later Iowa Wesleyan University) joined the Midwest Classic in the 1995–96 academic year.
- 1996 – Clarke left the Midwest Classic and the NAIA to join the NCAA Division III ranks and the Northern Illinois-Iowa Conference (NIIC) after the 1995–96 academic year.
- 2001 – William Penn University joined the Midwest Classic in the 2001–02 academic year.
- 2002 – Marycrest International left the Midwest Classic as the school announced that it would close after the 2001–02 academic year.
- 2003 – Waldorf College (now Waldorf University) joined the Midwest Classic in the 2003–04 academic year.
- 2007 – Clarke re-joined the Midwest Classic in the 2007–08 academic year.
- 2007 – The MCC has been renamed as the Midwest Collegiate Conference (MCC) in the 2007–08 academic year.
- 2010 – AIB College of Business joined the Midwest Collegiate in the 2010–11 academic year.
- 2012 – Three institutions left the Midwest Collegiate to join their respective new home primary conferences, all effective after the 2011–12 academic year:
  - Ashford and Iowa Wesleyan as NAIA Independents (Iowa Wesleyan would later apply to join the NCAA Division III ranks and the St. Louis Intercollegiate Athletic Conference [SLIAC], beginning the 2013–14 school year)
  - and Waldorf to join the Midlands Collegiate Athletic Conference (MCAC)
- 2015 – The Midwest Collegiate ceased operations as an athletic conference after the 2014–15 academic year; as many schools left to join their respective new home primary conferences, beginning the 2015–16 academic year:
  - Grand View and William Penn to the Heart of America Athletic Conference (HAAC)
  - Clarke and Mount Mercy as NAIA Independents (although both would later follow Grand View and William Penn to join the HAAC, beginning the 2016–17 school year)
  - St. Ambrose to the Chicagoland Collegiate Athletic Conference (CCAC)
  - Viterbo to the North Star Athletic Association (NSAA)
  - and AIB would discontinue its athletic program, before eventually ceasing operations after the 2015–16 school year, to be part of the University of Iowa

== Member schools ==
=== Final members ===
The MCC ended with seven full members, all were private schools:

Institution	Location	Founded	Affiliation	Enrollment	Nickname	Joined (Note: Represents the calendar year when fall sports competition begins.)	Left (Note: Represents the calendar year when spring sports competition ends.)	Subsequent conference(s)	Current conference
AIB College of Business	Des Moines, Iowa	1921	Non-profit	1,014	Eagles	2010	2015	N/A (Note: AIB discontinued athletics after the 2014–15 school year; and later closed after the 2015–16 school year.)	
Clarke University	Dubuque, Iowa	1843	Catholic (B.V.M.)	1,230	Crusaders (Note: Clarke is now competing as the Pride since the 2017–18 school year.)	1988; 2007	1996; 2015	NAIA Independent (2015–16)	Heart of America (HAAC) (2016–present)
Grand View University	Des Moines, Iowa	1896	Lutheran (ELCA)	2,000	Vikings	1989	2015	Heart of America (HAAC) (2015–present)	
Mount Mercy University	Cedar Rapids, Iowa	1928	Catholic (R.S.M.)	1,490	Mustangs	1988	2015	NAIA Independent (2015–16); Heart of America (HAAC) (2016–25)	Chicagoland (CCAC) (2025–present)
St. Ambrose University	Davenport, Iowa	1882	Catholic	3,607	Fighting Bees & Queen Bees	1990	2015	Chicagoland (CCAC) (2015–present)	
Viterbo University	La Crosse, Wisconsin	1923	Catholic (Diocese of Davenport)	2,991	V-Hawks	1988	2015	North Star (NSAA) (2015–24)	Chicagoland (CCAC) (2024–present)
William Penn University	Oskaloosa, Iowa	1873	Quakers	1,550	Statesmen & Lady Statesmen	2001	2015	Heart of America (HAAC) (2015–present)	

=== Former members ===
The MCC had five former full members, all were private schools:

Institution	Location	Founded	Affiliation	Enrollment	Nickname	Joined (Note: Represents the calendar year when fall sports competition begins.)	Left (Note: Represents the calendar year when spring sports competition ends.)	Subsequent conference(s)	Current conference
Ashford University (Note: Previously known as Mount St. Clare College before 2002, The Franciscan University and then the Franciscan University of the Prairies until 2005.)	Clinton, Iowa	1918	For-profit	N/A	Saints	1988	2012	NAIA Independent (2012–16)	N/A (Note: Ashford's physical campus was closed after the 2015–16 school year.)
Edgewood College (Note: Currently known as Edgewood University since 2025.)	Madison, Wisconsin	1927	Catholic (S.D.S.)	1,570	Eagles	1988	1989	Lake Michigan (LMC) (Note: Former NCAA Division III conference.) (1989–2006)	Northern (NACC) (Note: Currently an NCAA Division III athletic conference.) (2006–present)
Iowa Wesleyan College (Note: Later known as Iowa Wesleyan University since 2015.)	Mount Pleasant, Iowa	1842	United; Methodist	570	Tigers	1995	2012	various (Note: Iowa Wesleyan had joined the following subsequent conferences: as an NAIA Independent during the 2012–13 school year, and from 2021–22 to 2022–23; and the St. Louis Intercollegiate Athletic Conference (SLIAC) from 2013–14 to 2020–21.)	Closed in 2023
Marycrest International University	Davenport, Iowa	1939	Catholic (C.H.M.)	N/A	Eagles	1988	2002	Closed in 2002	
Waldorf College (Note: Currently known as Waldorf University since 2016.)	Forest City, Iowa	1903	For-profit	580	Warriors	2003	2012	Midlands (MCAC) (2012–15); North Star (NSAA) (2015–24)	Great Plains (GPAC) (2024–Present)

=== Membership timeline ===
Full member (non-football)

== Sports ==
The Midwest Collegiate Conference oversaw the following sports:

Conference sports
Sport	Men's	Women's
Baseball	✓	
Basketball	✓	✓
Cross Country	✓	✓
Golf	✓	✓
Soccer	✓	✓
Softball		✓
Track & Field Indoor	✓	✓
Track & Field Outdoor	✓	✓
Volleyball		✓

Member schools also participated in a number of sports not affiliated with the MCC, including competitive dance, tennis, men's volleyball, and wrestling. Several football teams from Midwest Collegiate Conference schools competed in the Mid-States Football Association.
