= Edgewood University =

Dominican college in Madison, Wisconsin, US

Coordinates: 43.057922°N 89.422919°W

- Former names: Edgewood Junior College (1927–1940); Edgewood College (1940–2025)
- Motto: Cor ad Cor Loquitur (Latin)
- Motto in English: "Heart Speaks to Heart"
- Type: Private university
- Established: September 4, 1927; 98 years ago
- Religious affiliation: Catholic (Dominican)
- Endowment: $50 million (2023)
- President: Andrew P. Manion
- Academic staff: 150
- Students: 2,469 (fall 2024)
- Undergraduates: 1,236 (fall 2024)
- Postgraduates: 1,233 (fall 2024)
- Location: Madison, Wisconsin, U.S.
- Campus: Suburban, 55 acres (22 ha)
- Colors: Edgewood Red and Black
- Nickname: Eagles
- Sporting affiliations: NACC
- Mascot: Eddy the Eagle
- Website: edgewood.edu

Edgewood University is a private Dominican university in Madison, Wisconsin, United States. It occupies a 55 acres (22 ha) campus overlooking Lake Wingra. Edgewood offers more than 40 undergraduate majors and 25 graduate degrees, and has an enrollment of over 2,400 students.

== History ==
The property that would become the Edgewood College campus was first purchased in 1855 from Governor Leonard J. Farwell and later developed by Samuel Marshall. Governor Cadwallader C. Washburn bought Edgewood Villa in 1873 and later donated it to the Dominican Sisters for educational use. In 1881, the Sisters opened St. Regina Academy, a private boarding school for girls with an initial enrollment of 16 students. A new building was constructed in 1893, but a fire later that year took the lives of three children and destroyed much of the property. The Sisters quickly raised funds and rebuilt the school, which reopened as Sacred Heart Academy in 1894.

By 1927, the school sought recognition as a junior college by the University of Wisconsin–Madison. The request was approved, and Edgewood Junior College opened in 1927 with 12 women enrolled. It offered a liberal arts curriculum at a tuition of under $600 per year. Enrollment grew slowly through the Great Depression, with a focus on supporting women's education. During this period, the college shared facilities and services with Edgewood High School of the Sacred Heart. Edgewood's junior college operated alongside the high school until it transitioned to a full-fledged college.

In 1941, Edgewood became a four-year college and received approval from the Wisconsin Department of Public Instruction to award Bachelor of Science degrees in education. By 1942, the first 25 students graduated with degrees in education. Although enrollment grew slowly in the college's early years, many older students and Dominican Sisters attended to earn degrees in elementary education. Summer sessions attracted notable faculty, including world-renowned musician Nadia Boulanger. By 1948, the first international students enrolled, and in 1949, the college admitted its first African-American students.

Edgewood continued to grow in the late 1940s with an increasingly diverse student body. The first African-American faculty member, Sharon Wexler, was hired in 1956. With the approval of the college's board of trustees and the leadership council of the Dominican Sisters of Sinsinawa, Edgewood College's leadership renamed it Edgewood University in 2025, its centennial year. The change was made official on July 1.

== Campus ==
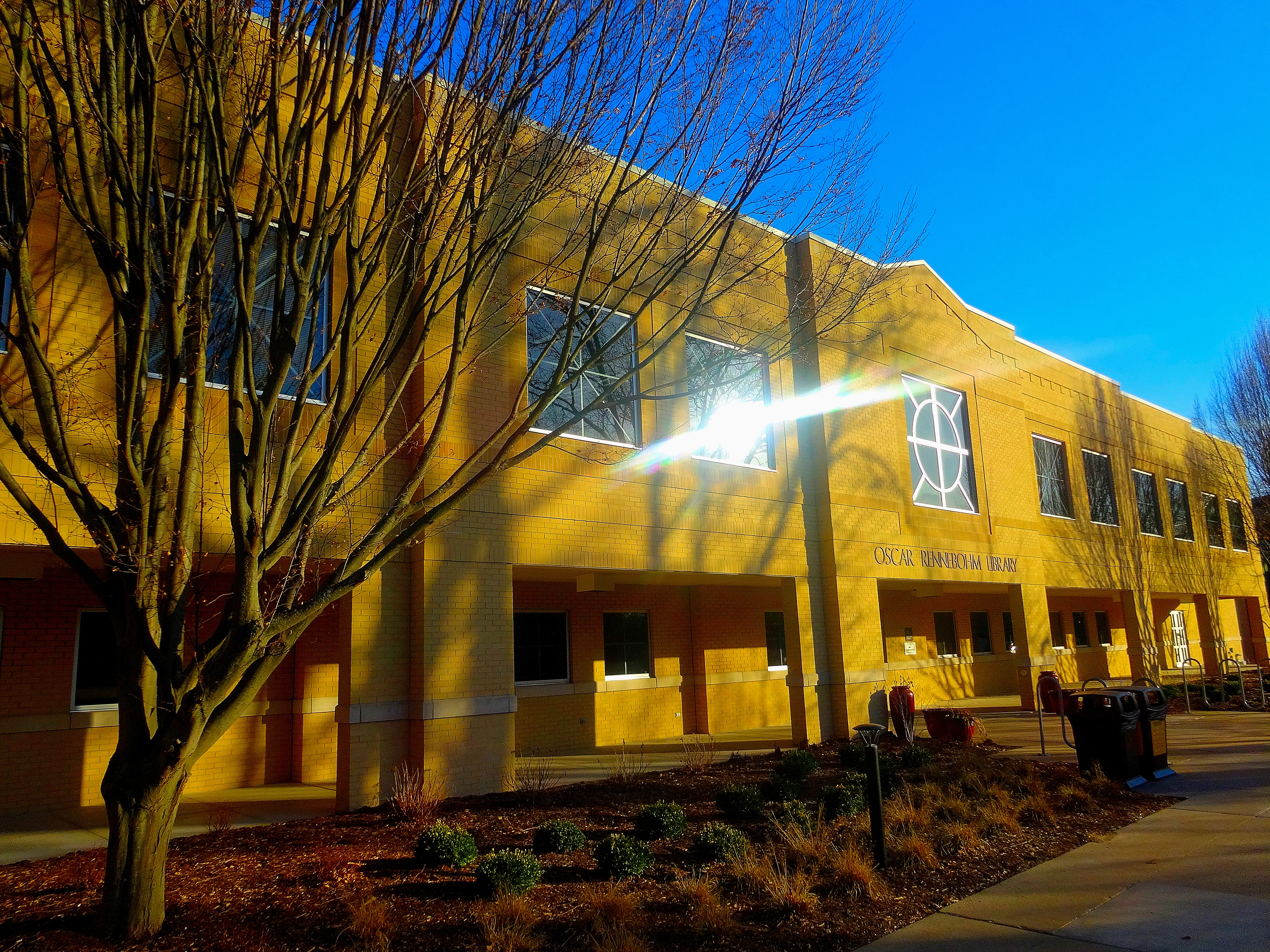
Oscar Rennebohm Library

Marshall Hall, on the hillside overlooking campus, is Edgewood's oldest building. It was erected in the late 19th century and later renovated into living quarters.

The Oscar Rennebohm Library, a 40,000-square-foot (3,700 m^{2}) structure, was completed in 1991. Overlooking Lake Wingra, it has a collection of over 120,000 books, newspapers, videos, journals, microforms, music, computer software and K–12 curriculum materials, along with media rooms and about 140 computers. Edgewood's library website also provides access to full-text journals, electronic book collections, and other online databases. Edgewood students also have access to the University of Wisconsin–Madison libraries and the Madison Public Library system.

There are two cafés, Phil's and Wingra. Phil's, the first campus dining facility to earn Green Restaurant Certification, provides a more traditional dining experience compared to the grab-and-go style of Wingra Cafe.

Edgewood has a variety of housing, both on and off campus. The LEED-Silver certified Dominican Hall of 2007 houses students in single and double rooms within suites. Edgewood offers co-educational housing as well as all-girls' singles in Regina Hall and boys' singles in Marshall Hall. Some students live on campus in more apartment-style housing in the Weber and Sienna Heights Apartments. Much on-campus housing has a view of Lake Wingra. Edgewood also offers off-campus living in area apartment buildings.

The Stream is Edgewood's visual and theatre arts center. It houses the Art and Theatre Arts Departments, the Edgewood University Gallery, and The Black Box, the college's theatre. The building overlooks the surrounding woods and Lake Wingra.

In 2006, Edgewood became Wisconsin's first college to be Green Tier Certified by the Wisconsin Department of Natural Resources.

== Academics ==
Academic rankings

National
- Forbes: 471
- U.S. News & World Report: 315

Edgewood University offers more than 40 majors and 40 minors, as well as 25 graduate programs. Many of the graduate programs are housed on the Deming Way campus, nine miles west of the main campus. The college also offers international study and internship programs. More than 75% of classes have fewer than 20 students and the average class is 15 students. Edgewood has a student-to-teacher ratio of 12:1. It's 4-year graduation rate in 2024 was about 47% while the 6-year graduation rate was 66.4%. Edgewood's Career Services Department offers professional help in resume writing, mock interviewing, job assistance, and one-on-one student counseling.

The college's agreement with the University of Wisconsin system allows Edgewood students to take classes Edgewood does not offer. Edgewood allows the credits and grades to appear on student transcripts. To participate, students must pay tuition to Edgewood and maintain solid academic standing.

Edgewood belongs to over 30 associations and is accredited by the Higher Learning Commission of the North Central Association of Colleges and Schools. Its business program is accredited by the Association of Collegiate Business Schools and Programs, its nursing program by the Commission on Collegiate Nursing Education (CCNE) and the Wisconsin State Board of Nursing, and its teaching and administration programs by the National Council for Accreditation of Teacher Education.

Edgewood offers the Collaborative program option for students who want to take classes that apply to their major through the University of Wisconsin–Madison. Students in this program can take one class per semester and not more than five credits per year from the university.

== Student life ==
Edgewood has a variety of resources on its campus. Regular events include Milwaukee Brewers games, Friday After Class (FAC), cookoffs, Mazzuchelli Fest, and holiday parties, and are announced in the campus newspaper On the Edge, published every three weeks during the academic year.

=== Performing arts ===
Performing arts at Edgewood began in the early 1960s with the production of Synge's Riders to the Sea. In the following four decades, performances have included Gypsy, Dead Man Walking, The Glass Menagerie, The Importance of Being Earnest, and several Shakespearean plays. The Performing Arts Department typically puts on four productions a year, for which anyone from the community can audition. Students also direct their own one-act plays every other year. Edgewood offers several theater scholarships.

The Performing Arts Program has two other organizations: an Improv group, Wacktastics, and the student-operated Theatre Assembly, which provides information, resources, and activities students who want to participate in theatre.

The music department features a diverse array of performing organizations, including choirs, orchestra, band, jazz ensemble, chamber groups, and Western African and Middle Eastern drumming. 25% of all undergraduate students enroll in a music course each semester. In addition, there are performing opportunities for Madison-area community members.

== Athletics ==
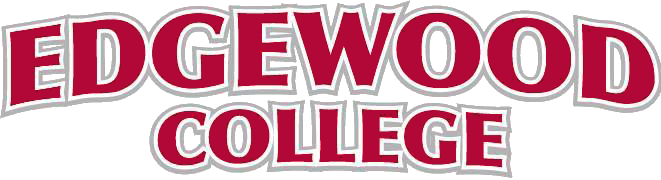
Edgewood athletics wordmark

The Edgewood athletic teams are called the Eagles. The university is a member of the Division III level of the National Collegiate Athletic Association (NCAA), primarily competing in the Northern Athletics Collegiate Conference (NACC) since the 2006–07 academic year. The Eagles previously competed in the defunct Lake Michigan Conference (LMC) from 1974–75 to 2005–06; as well as competing in the Midwest Collegiate Conference (MCC) of the National Association of Intercollegiate Athletics (NAIA) only during the 1988–89 school year (while holding dual affiliation membership with the NAIA and the NCAA).

Edgewood competes in 20 intercollegiate varsity sports: Men's sports include baseball, basketball, cross country, golf, lacrosse, soccer, tennis, track & field and volleyball; while women's sports include basketball, bowling, cross country, golf, lacrosse, soccer, softball, tennis, track & field and volleyball; and co-ed sports include eSports.

=== History ===
Women's athletics began in 1975, when the school was in the "Wisconsin Independent Colleges Women's Athletic Conference" (WIC-WAC). The men's athletic teams were originally in the Wisconsin Conference of Independent Colleges in 1974. In 1981, the conference changed its name to the Lake Michigan Conference (LMC). In the 1989–90 season, the members of the WIC-WAC women's conference joined the LMC, so that the men's and women's programs were in the same conference.

The 2005–06 season was the final year of the LMC. In 2006, all LMC members merged with the Northern Illinois-Iowa Conference (NIIC) members to form the Northern Athletics Conference, an NCAA Division III athletic conference.

Edgewood University has a dance team that performs at home athletic events and during Homecoming.

=== Accomplishments ===
In the Lake Michigan Conference, Edgewood won 35 conference titles. Men's athletics won eight conference titles; men's basketball in 1991–92, 1992–93, 1996–1997, 2000–2001, men's golf in 2005, men's soccer in 1996 and 2000, and baseball in 2005 and 2006. The women's athletics won 27 conference titles; women's basketball in 1991–1992, 1992–1993, 2000–2001, 2004–05, women's cross country in 2003, women's soccer in 1994-2000 and 2005, softball in 1994, 1996, 2005, 2006, women's golf in 1999 and 2004, women's tennis in 1991-1997 and 2000, and volleyball 1994 and 1996.

In 2009, the Edgewood College cross country men's team took first place at the NAC conference meet and the women's team took second, both the best team finishes in program history.

=== Club sports ===
Edgewood also offers intramural sports including basketball, volleyball, soccer, bowling, and yoga.

=== Facilities ===
Edgewood teams play at the Todd Wehr Edgedome (volleyball and basketball), Breese Stevens Field, Madison (soccer), Yahara Golf Course, Madison (women's golf), the Oaks Golf Course (men's golf), McKee Farms Park, Fitchburg (tennis), Verona Little League Complex, Verona (softball), and Stampfl Field, Verona (baseball).

Edgewood's fitness center, which is free to Edgewood students and faculty, is on the lower level of the Sonderegger Science Center. It provides equipment such as treadmills, ellipticals, bicycles, free weights, and selectorized weight equipment. It also has six televisions.

== Notable alumni ==
- Alex Dallman, member of the Wisconsin State Assembly
- Jeff Erlanger, advocate and activist for disability rights
- Becca Hamilton, Olympian and national women's champion curler
- Alexis Herman, 23rd United States Secretary of Labor
- Dianne Hesselbein, minority leader of the Wisconsin Senate
- Meg Johnson, poet and lecturer
