= List of defunct men's college basketball conferences in the United States =

The official logo of the National Collegiate Athletic Association

This is a list of defunct National Collegiate Athletic Association (NCAA) men's college basketball conferences in the United States. The NCAA is divided into three divisions, based on school size and enrollment. Each division is made up of several conferences for regional league play. Over time, these conferences will disband due to lack of teams, joining of their teams to other conferences, lack of budget, merging to another conference, stopped sponsoring basketball or simply a command from the NCAA.

College basketball was started in 1895 with its first ever game between Hamline and Minnesota. It was later developed in 1896 with its first game in a five player format with Chicago against Iowa. Almost all schools are independent at that time until since the formation of the Intercollegiate Athletic Association of the United States (now NCAA) in 1906. But even before the development, conferences began to form, such as the Intercollegiate Conference of Faculty Representatives (now Big Ten Conference) in 1896 which is the oldest active conference in the NCAA, and the Eastern Intercollegiate Basketball League formed in 1901, which was folded into the Ivy League in 1955.

As of July 2019, there are 30 defunct conferences in total: 20 conferences in Division I, six in Division II and four in Division III. The defunct conference that was active for the shortest period is the Northern California Conference, formed in 1937 and ended in 1939; the longest-lived defunct conference is the West Virginia Intercollegiate Athletic Conference (WVIAC), which has a span of 89 years (1924 to 2013). The most recent conference to dissolve is the Division II Heartland Conference, which disbanded at the end of the 2018–19 school year, with seven of its nine members joining the Lone Star Conference and the other two moving to the Mid-America Intercollegiate Athletics Association.

== Division I ==
Conference	Founded	Dissolved	Members	Map	Ref
American South Conference	1987	1991	7		
American West Conference	1993	1996	4 (Note: The American West Conference began as a football-only league in 1993 with five teams. Charter member UC Davis left after that season, leaving only four teams when it began sponsoring basketball in 1994.)		
Big Eight Conference	1907 (Note: The Big Eight Conference started basketball in 1928.)	1996	8		
Border Intercollegiate Athletic Association	1931	1962	6		
East Coast Conference	1958 (Note: The East Coast Conference started basketball in 1974.)	1994	6		
Eastern Intercollegiate Basketball League	1901	1955	8		
Eastern Intercollegiate Conference	1932	1939	6		
Great Midwest Conference	1991	1995	7		
Great West Conference	2004 (Note: The Great West Conference, originally a football-only league, began sponsoring basketball in 2009.)	2013	5		
Gulf Star Conference	1984	1987	6		
Middle Atlantic States Conference North	1946	1949	6		
Metropolitan Collegiate Conference	1965	1969	10		
Metro Conference	1975	1995	7		
Metropolitan New York Conference	1933 (Note: The Metropolitan New York Conference started basketball in 1943.)	1963	11		
Middle Three Conference	1943	1952	3		
New Jersey-New York 7 Conference	1976	1979	7		
Northern California Conference	1937	1939	5		
Pacific Coast Conference	1915	1959	9		
Southwest Conference	1914	1996	8		
Western New York Little Three Conference	1946	1958	3		

== Division II ==
Conference	Founded	Dissolved	Members	Map	Ref
Heartland Conference	1999	2019	9		
Indiana Collegiate Conference	1951	1979	8		
Indiana Intercollegiate Conference	1922	1950	7		
Mason-Dixon Conference	1940	1974	10*		
North Central Conference	1922	2008	8		
West Virginia Intercollegiate Athletic Conference	1924	2013	15		

== Division III ==
Conference	Founded	Dissolved	Members	Map	Ref
Lake Michigan Conference	1974	2006	8		
Northern Illinois-Iowa Conference	1969	2006	6		
Texas Intercollegiate Athletic Association	1976	1996	9		
Wisconsin State University Conference	1913	1997	8		

== See also ==
- List of defunct college football conferences
