= Robyn Moodaly =

South African soccer player

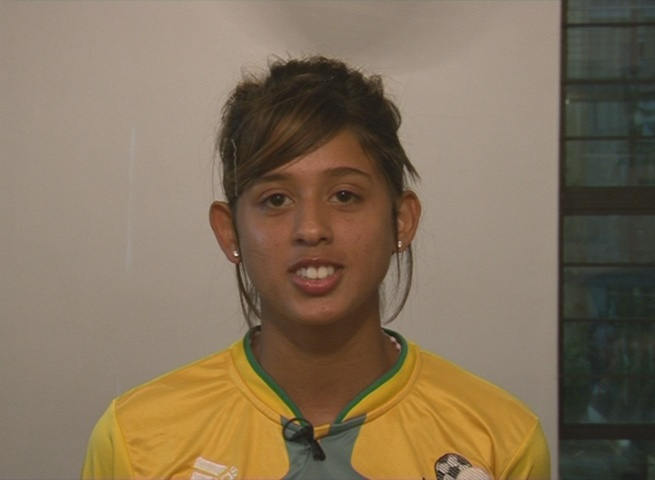
- Moodaly in 2011

Personal information
- Full name: Robyn Kimberly Moodaly
- Date of birth: 16 June 1994 (age 32)
- Place of birth: East London, Eastern Cape, South Africa
- Height: 1.64 m (5 ft 4 1/2 in)
- Position: Midfielder

College career
Years	Team	Apps	(Gls)
2013–2014	AIB Eagles		
2015–2018	Northwestern Ohio		

Senior career*
Years	Team	Apps	(Gls)
2013	Colorado Rush	2	

International career
2010	South Africa U-17		
2011–	South Africa	16	(0)
Medal record
Representing South Africa
Women's Africa Cup of Nations
First place	2022 Morocco
- * Club domestic league appearances and goals as of 11 August 2014

Robyn Kimberly Moodaly (born 16 June 1994) is a South African soccer player who plays as a midfielder for the South Africa women's national team. She attended the 2012 and 2016 Summer Olympics.

== Early life ==
Robyn Moodaly was born in East London, Eastern Cape, South Africa. She began to play football, as she was growing up, describing it as "being in my genes". Moodaly played mostly with boys' teams, since there were no girls teams nearby and eventually moved to Johannesburg to continue to play the game.

In 2013, Moodaly joined AIB College of Business in Des Moines, Iowa. She trained with the college soccer team but was unable to play in any fixtures in 2013 due to red tape. Moodaly played two games for W-League team Colorado Rush Women in 2013.

== International career ==
While attending the University of Pretoria's High Performance Centre, Moodaly came to the attention of South Africa women's national football team selectors who drafted her into the national Under–17 squad. Moodaly was then part of the South African selection at the 2010 FIFA U-17 Women's World Cup. She made her debut for the senior national team aged 16 in January 2011. She only appeared for the under-21 team after she had already played for the senior side, switching back and forth between the two sides on several occasions. She attributed this to a lack of female players available. She was selected for the South African squad at the 2012 Summer Olympics in London, United Kingdom.

During the following years, she was hampered by injuries, and fought to be fit in time for the 2016 Summer Olympics in Rio de Janeiro, Brazil. She was selected for the warm-up match immediately prior to the tournament, against world champions the United States. She was subsequently selected for the squad.

Moodaly was part of the South African squad that won the 2022 Women's Africa Cup of Nations, following which she announced her retirement from the national team in 2023.

She returned to the national team for the 2026 Women's Africa Cup of Nations.

== Personal life ==
Moodaly is in a relationship with South African soccer player Gabriela Salgado. Having been engaged in December 2024, they married in November 2025.

== Honours ==
South Africa

- Women's Africa Cup of Nations: 2022
