= Jeanna Giese =

American rabies survivor (born 1989)

- Born: June 6, 1989 (age 37); Fond du Lac, Wisconsin, U.S.
- Education: Lakeland University
- Occupations: Public speaker; activist
- Known for: First survivor of rabies without taking the rabies vaccine
- Spouse: Scot Frassetto (m. 2014)
- Children: 3

Jeanna Giese-Frassetto (born June 6, 1989) is an American rabies survivor. In 2004, when she was aged 15, she was bitten by a bat. A month later in October, she developed flu-symptoms and her physical state quickly deteriorated. After she was diagnosed with rabies, doctors at Children's Wisconsin used an experimental treatment called the Milwaukee protocol to put her in an induced coma to allow for her body to produce the antibodies needed to fend off the virus. She awoke from her coma a week later and became the first known survivor of rabies who did not take the rabies vaccine.

== Early life and education ==
Jeanna Giese was born to parents Ann and John Giese on June 6, 1989, in Fond du Lac, Wisconsin. She has three brothers and was raised Catholic. Giese attended St. Mary's Springs Academy, where she played volleyball, and graduated in 2007.

== Rabies ==
On September 12, 2004, 15-year-old Giese was attending church in Fond du Lac when a bat entered. Giese picked up the bat to take it outside, and it bit her left hand's index finger. Giese treated the injury with hydrogen peroxide at home but did not otherwise seek medical attention, such as immunization, which is recommended after contact with bats.

For a month, the rabies virus duplicated and began traveling towards her brain through a nerve, at approximately one centimeter per hour. A month after the bite, on October 13, 2004, Giese developed flu symptoms. Her bitten hand became numb, she experienced double vision, and had weakness of her left leg. She was admitted to a local hospital two days later, where doctors assumed she had autoimmune encephalitis after imaging showed her brain to be normal. She was discharged due to the fact, and went to the Children's Wisconsin on October 18 after her illness worsened. Her temperature went up to 102 °F (39 °C), her speech became slurred, she had an elevated white blood cell count, and she experienced tremors in her bitten arm, amongst other symptoms.

Doctors at the hospital heard about the bat and realized she had rabies. They sent Giese's saliva, spinal fluid, skin and blood to be sampled at the rabies laboratory in the Centers for Disease Control and Prevention (CDC), which took 24 hours. At this point, Giese was lethargic, weak, and unbalanced, although she could still perform basic instructions. While waiting for the results, Rodney E. Willoughby Jr., who was attending to Jeanna, contacted Cathleen Hanlon, a rabies specialist at the CDC, who informed him that it was unlikely Giese could be saved. Once a rabies victim displays symptoms, they usually die within a few days.

Through Willoughby's research, he discovered that rabies victims who died after multiple weeks often had no trace of the virus in their bodies and their brains were normal, indicating that the body could eradicate the virus, although it was too slow to do so. With this information, he theorized that by putting Giese in an induced coma, the disease could be eradicated from her body.

Giese's parents were informed of her diagnosis, and were made aware that she would likely die. They consented to the experiment in the hopes that it could aid in rabies research. On October 19, the team at Children's Hospital used ketamine to induce the coma, supported by amantadine, midazolam, and phenobarbital. She was kept in the coma for a week, where the team observed no typical symptoms of late-stage rabies such as rapid heart rate and blood pressure. At the end of the week, her body began producing antibodies to prevent the virus from attacking new cells. When the team brought her back from the coma, she was paralyzed. However, a day later, she gained movement in her legs and tried opening her eyes. Giese said "I was basically a newborn baby at the age of 15. I couldn't do anything".

As a result of her coma, Giese lost all strength, stamina, and coordination, and had a long recovery period. She could sit up on the bed by the 12th day after being brought back from the coma. She was diagnosed with biopterin deficiency, which is a deficiency of the molecule responsible for some cell growth and neurotransmitters such as dopamine, epinephrine, norepinephrine, serotonin, and melatonin. After she was supplemented with biopterin, Giese could speak and swallow. Giese became the first known person to survive rabies without receiving the rabies vaccine, and became famous. She also became the second person to survive rabies after a bat bite; the first survivor was vaccinated. She did not suffer impact to her mental and cognitive abilities from the rabies or coma.

By November 30, a fundraiser for Giese's family had raised $47,000. She left the hospital on January 1, 2005, with her family. Giese's care cost $800,000 (equivalent to $1,363,636 in 2025). The treatment used to save Giese was named the Milwaukee protocol.

Although the Milwaukee protocol was attempted 6 times since Giese's success as of 2007, they all resulted in deaths. This has led to queries about how Giese did not die. Some rabies experts suggested that Giese was infected with a weak variant of rabies. As the CDC could not collect samples of the virus itself, this theory can neither be proven nor disproven. As of 2015, there were 31 failures of the method, and critics highlighted issues with its reliability for human rabies patients. The same year, specialists reached the conclusion that the protocol was ineffective.

== Life after rabies ==
Giese returned to school for the 2005–2006 academic year after taking classes over the summer to catch up on missed work. She could not play volleyball again while in high school. In 2005, she was an opener for the Milwaukee Bucks. In 2006, Giese won the "Youth of the Year Award" given by the Fond du Lac Country Law Enforcement Association.

She studied at Marian University and transferred to Lakeland University in 2010, where she graduated in 2011 with a major in biology.

In August 2013, Giese's Siberian Huskies bit a rabies-infected bat. The dogs were vaccinated and quarantined.

Giese has become an activist and public speaker for rabies information, and was an ambassador for the Global Alliance for Rabies Control as of 2016. On the first anniversary of Giese's rabies diagnosis, she attended and was the guest of honor at a meeting for rabies researchers, where she gave a speech.

As of 2016, although Giese gained all motor ability back, her left side of the body reacts slower than her right and she has to perform regular exercise.

Giese got married in 2014. As of 2024, she has three children and lives in Wisconsin, where she works at the Children's Museum of Fond du Lac.
