= Eastern Mennonite Royals =

- University: Eastern Mennonite University
- Conference: Old Dominion Athletic Conference; Continental Volleyball Conference (men's volleyball)
- NCAA: Division III
- Athletic director: Carrie Bert
- Location: Harrisonburg, Virginia
- Varsity teams: 17
- Basketball arena: Yoder Arena at University Commons
- Baseball stadium: EMU Baseball Field
- Soccer stadium: EMU Turf Field
- Nickname: Royals
- Colors: White and Royal Blue
- Website: www.emuroyals.com
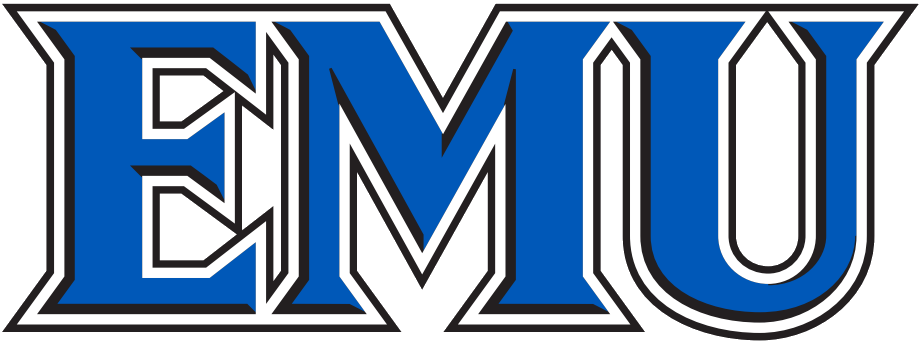

The Eastern Mennonite Royals (also EMU Royals) are the athletic teams that represent Eastern Mennonite University, located in Harrisonburg, Virginia, in NCAA Division III intercollegiate sports. The Royals compete as full, non-football members of the Old Dominion Athletic Conference. In men's volleyball, a sport not sponsored by the ODAC, EMU competes in the Continental Volleyball Conference. Altogether, Eastern Mennonite sponsors 16 sports: 7 for men and 9 for women.

== Varsity teams ==
Men's sports	Women's sports
Baseball	Basketball
Basketball	Cross country
Cross country	Disc golf
Disc golf	Field hockey
Soccer	Lacrosse
Track and field	Soccer
Volleyball	Softball
	Track and field
	Triathlon
	Volleyball

=== Basketball ===
At the end of the 2009–10 season EMU's men's basketball team had 25–5 record and was ranked No. 4 in the nation by D3hoops.com.

=== Softball ===
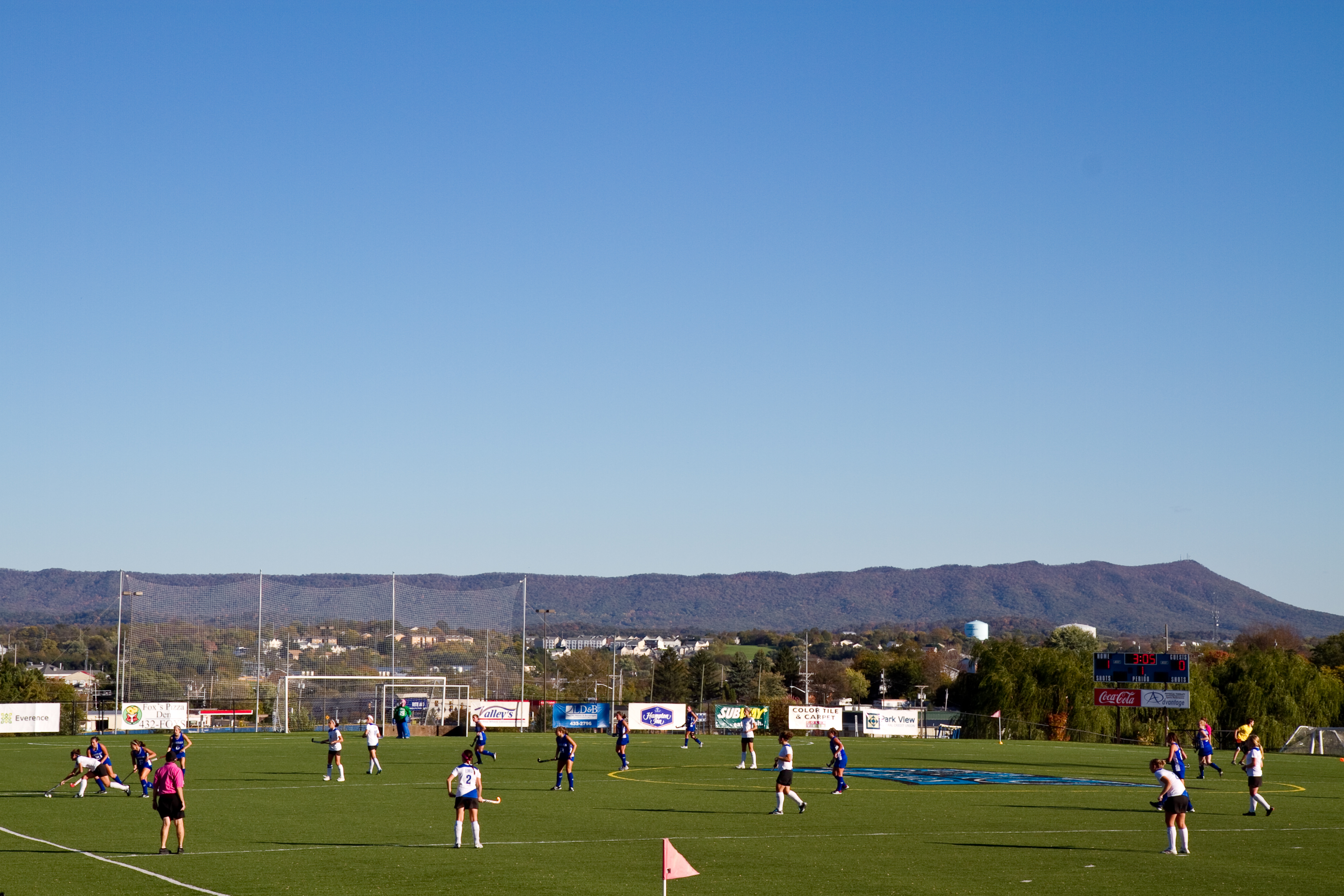
Field hockey match at EMU

In the spring of 2010, women's softball entered in the ODAC tournament as the 8th seed team. They advanced to the championship game and defeated Virginia Wesleyan 5–1 to become the 2010 ODAC champions, advancing to the D-III national softball tournament for the first time in school history.
