= Lake Michigan Conference (college conference) =

Former collegiate athletic conference in Wisconsin

The Lake Michigan Conference (LMC) was a college athletic conference affiliated with the National Collegiate Athletic Association (NCAA) at the Division III level for the last 7-8 years of its existence after member schools transitioned up from NAIA. Member institutions were all located in Wisconsin except Dominican University in Illinois. LMC schools joined with some schools from the Northern Illinois-Iowa Conference (NIIC) in the 2006–07 school year, creating the Northern Athletics Conference (NAC, now known as the Northern Athletics Collegiate Conference, or NACC).

== History ==
The conference was formed as the Wisconsin Conference of Independent Colleges (WCIC) in 1969 with seven charter members; it changed its name in 1983.

== Member schools ==
=== Charter members ===
- Blackhawk Technical College
- Cardinal Stritch University
- Gateway Technical College at (Kenosha)
- Gateway Technical College at (Racine)
- Maranatha Baptist Bible College
- Marian University
- Northwestern College
- St. Francis de Sales College

=== Final members ===
Institution	Location	Founded	Affiliation	Enrollment	Nickname	Joined	Left	Current conference
Alverno College	Milwaukee, Wisconsin	1887	Catholic (SSSF)	1,932	Inferno	2004	2006	Northern (NACC)
Concordia University	Mequon, Wisconsin	1880	Lutheran LCMS	1,600	Falcons	1982	2006	Northern (NACC)
Dominican University	River Forest, Illinois	1901	Catholic (Dominican)	3,250	Stars	2005	2006	Northern (NACC)
Edgewood College (Note: Currently known as Edgewood University since 2025.)	Madison, Wisconsin	1927	Catholic (S.D.S.)	2,000	Eagles	1974; (Note: Edgewood left the WCIC/LMC after the 1980–81 school year; before returning in the 1990–91 school year.); 1990	1981; 2006	Northern (NACC)
Lakeland College (Note: Currently known as Lakeland University since 2016.)	Plymouth, Wisconsin	1862	United Church of Christ	950	Muskies	1982	2006	Northern (NACC)
Maranatha Baptist Bible College (Note: Currently known as Maranatha Baptist University since 2013.)	Watertown, Wisconsin	1968	Baptist	850	Crusaders	1974	2006	D-III Independent
Marian University	Fond du Lac, Wisconsin	1936	Catholic (C.S.S.A.)	2,918	Sabres	1974	2006	Northern (NACC)
Milwaukee School of Engineering	Milwaukee, Wisconsin	1903	Nonsectarian	1,395	Raiders	1977	2006	Northern (NACC)
Wisconsin Lutheran College	Milwaukee, Wisconsin	1973	Lutheran WELS	765	Warriors	1987	2006	Northern (NACC)

=== Former members ===
Institution	Location	Founded	Affiliation	Enrollment	Nickname	Joined	Left	Current conference
Blackhawk Technical College	Janesville, Wisconsin	1911	Public (Note: Part of the Wisconsin Technical College System.)	6,000	Blackhawks	1975	1977	N/A (Note: This institution no longer supports intercollegiate athletics.)
Cardinal Stritch University	Milwaukee, Wisconsin	1937	Catholic (S.S.F.A.)	3,100	Wolves	1974	1997	Closed in 2023
Gateway Technical College–Kenosha	Kenosha, Wisconsin	1912	Public	5,000	Tigers	1974	1977	N/A
Gateway Technical College–Racine	Racine, Wisconsin	1911	Public	5,000	Lions	1969	1977	N/A
Mount Mary College (Note: This institution is a women's college. Therefore it does not compete in men's sports.) (Note: Currently known as Mount Mary University since 2013.)	Milwaukee, Wisconsin	1913	Catholic (SSND)	1,702	Blue Angels	1989	1997	Chicagoland (CCAC)(NAIA)
Northwestern College	Watertown, Wisconsin	1863	Lutheran WELS	N/A	Trojans	1974	1995	N/A (Note: Northwestern (Wisc.) closed its doors in 1995 when it combined with Martin Luther College of New Ulm, Minnesota.)
Silver Lake College (Note: Later became Holy Family College of Wisconsin until 2019.)	Manitowoc, Wisconsin	1885	Catholic (Franciscan)	1,000	Lakers	1989	1997	Closed in 2019
St. Francis de Sales College	Milwaukee, Wisconsin	1969	Catholic	N/A	N/A	1969	1977	N/A (Note: This institution is no longer a college, as it became a seminary in 1982.)
Trinity Christian College	Palos Hills, Illinois	1959	Reformed	1,280	Trolls	1981	1987	Chicagoland (CCAC) (Note: Currently an NAIA athletic conference.)

== Sports ==
The LMC sponsored intercollegiate athletic competition in men's baseball, men's and women's basketball, men's and women's cross country, men's and women's golf, men's and women's soccer, women's softball, men's and women's tennis, women's volleyball, and men's wrestling.
