= AIB College of Business =

Private college in Des Moines, Iowa, U.S.

Coordinates: 41.56238°N 93.645424°W

- Motto: "Ethical, productive, and engaged citizens."
- Type: Not-for-profit private university
- Active: 1921–2016
- Affiliations: University of Iowa
- Location: Des Moines, Iowa, U.S.
- Campus: Urban
- Colors: Blue, Red, White
- Nickname: Eagles
- Mascot: E.O. the Eagle
- Website: aibcollegedsm.com

Campus view

AIB College of Business was an accredited, independent, nonprofit, baccalaureate college of business located in Des Moines, Iowa, United States. The college closed on June 30, 2016, after 95 years and gifted its property to the Board of Regents, State of Iowa. The campus was operated by the University of Iowa from 2016 to 2018 when the University of Iowa announced plans to close down and sell the 17-acre campus. The University of Iowa sold the campus property in August 2019, for $7.5 million. Proceeds from the land and building sale created the AIB College of Business Scholarship Fund, which provides renewable $1,000 scholarship awards to qualified UI students. In the fall of 2020, 40 students received scholarships. All were residents of Iowa and majoring in business-related programs.

== History ==
American Institute of Business was founded in 1921 by Everett O. Fenton and Ray Hansen. The institution was first located at the Victoria Hotel on Sixth Avenue in Des Moines. In 1935, AIB moved to Tenth Street and Grand Avenue, the heart of the downtown business district. It educated students at that location for 37 years. In 1941, the college was reorganized as a nonprofit. In 1957, Keith Fenton became AIB's second president. In 1986, AIB became accredited with the North Central Association of Colleges and Schools Commission on Institutions of Higher Education. In 1998, Keith Fenton retired as president of AIB after 42 years of service. The Administration Building was renamed the Keith Fenton Administration Building. In 1999, Nancy Williams, the granddaughter of Everett O. Fenton, was elected president of AIB after 17 years with the college. In 2000, the college changed its name from American Institute of Business to AIB College of Business.

In January 2015, AIB College of Business and the University of Iowa announced that AIB would be "gifted" to the UI and become the UI's Des Moines campus with AIB students grandfathered in. However, plans quickly shifted, and the Iowa Board of Regents approved on a plan to turn the campus into a Regents Regional Resource Center for the Des Moines market, managed by the UI. AIB students would have instead to graduate or transfer before the campus closed in June 2016. The center is in theory open to the UI, Iowa State University, and the University of Northern Iowa, though only the UI currently plans to offer programs on site. The regents asked a consultant to review whether the AIB site is the best fit for the resource center in the long term and left open the possibility of selling the campus. The site is worth about $20.4 million. The consultant found that the campus is not the "most positive" location for such for such a center. Bruce Rastetter, Board of Regents President, commented that the AIB Campus "is downtown!" during a campus visit. In July 2018, the University of Iowa announced that they would close the AIB Campus and sell the land and buildings. Proceeds of the property sale were put in a dedicated scholarship fund to assist central Iowa students.

== Education ==
AIB offered Bachelor of Science degrees in Accounting, Business Administration, Court Reporting and Steno Reporting. The college also offered Associate of Applied Science (A.A.S) degree programs in the fields of Accounting, Business Administration, Information Technology, Sports and Event Management, Travel and Tourism, Media Communications, and Voice Captioning. Business Administration degrees were offered in the areas of Leadership, Financial Services, and Sales and Marketing. All associate degree majors were also available online. AIB was one of the few institutions in the United States that offers a college degree in Voice Captioning.

The average tuition rate at AIB in 2009 per student was $26,000 per year including fees and books. The student to faculty ratio is approximately 18:1. Of the 7 degree programs offered at AIB, 5 of them are eligible for distance education.

== Athletics ==
The AIB athletic teams were called the Eagles. The college was a member of the National Association of Intercollegiate Athletics (NAIA), primarily competing in the Midwest Collegiate Conference (MCC) from 2010–11 to 2014–15 (when the conference dissolved).

AIB competed in 13 intercollegiate varsity sports: Men's sports included baseball, basketball, bowling, golf and soccer (wrestling was to be added in 2017); while women's sports included basketball, bowling, competitive dance, golf, soccer, softball and volleyball. Cheerleading was offered as a co-ed sport. AIB also had a school band and many clubs.

=== Accomplishments ===
In 2013 the AIB dance team received their first D1 rating at the State Competition. In 2014 the women's soccer team won the MCC Championship. In 2014 the baseball team placed 2nd in the MCC Championship. In 2015 the boys basketball team losses to William Penn University in MCC Tournament Semi-Final.

=== Facilities ===
The AIB Eagles played their basketball home games in the AIB Activities Center – a $5 million facility that can accommodate more than 2,000 people. The facility, built in 1999, features a gymnasium, running track, cardio room and weight room. It also has men's and women's locker rooms, a press box, scoreboards and concession areas.
