= The Oaks Golf Course =

Golf course in Wisconsin, United States

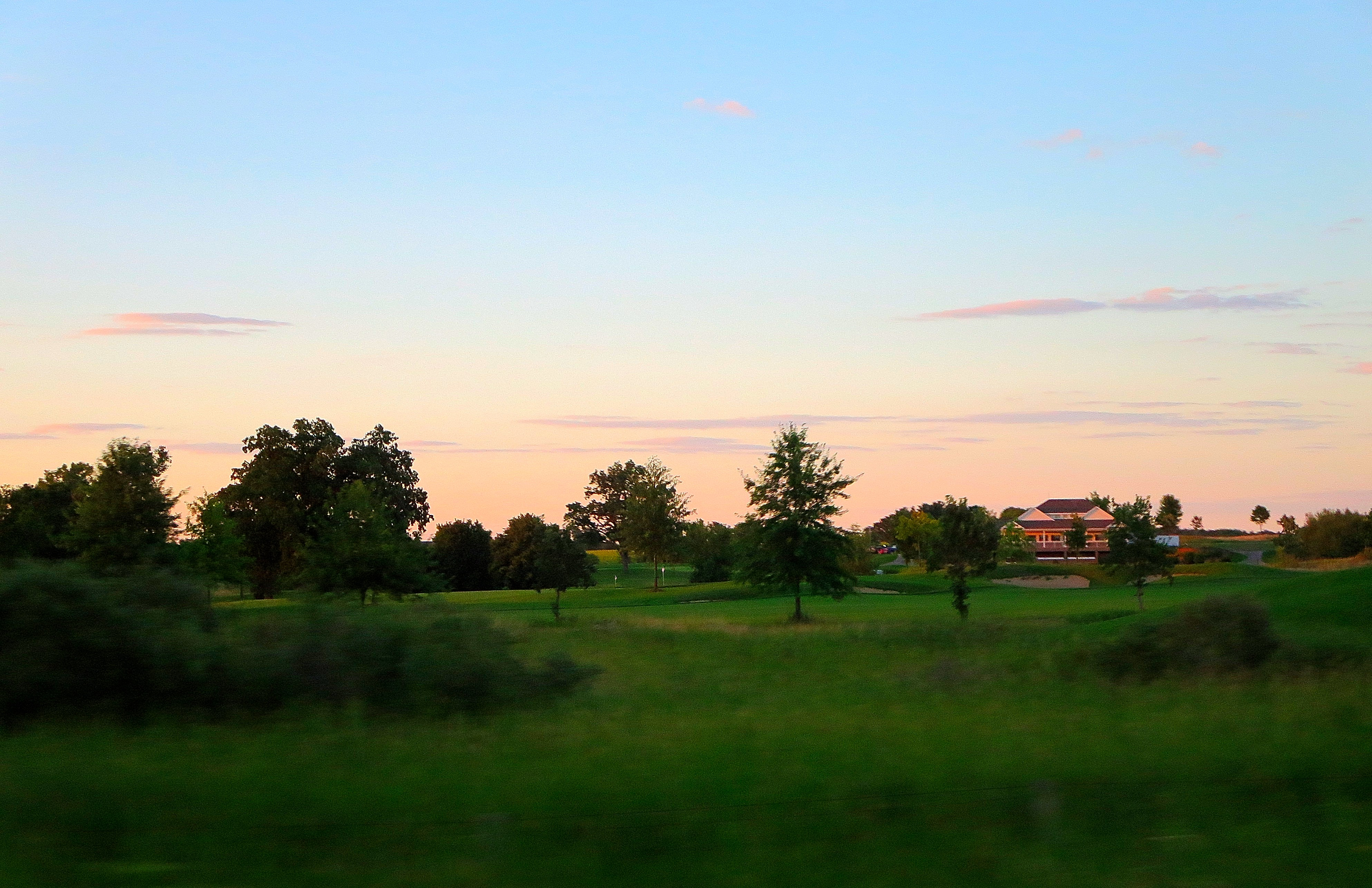
- The Oaks Golf Course at sunset

- Location in Wisconsin
- 43.1125°N 89.1718°W

Club information
- Location: Cottage Grove, Wisconsin, USA
- Established: 2003; 23 years ago
- Type: Public
- Tota holes: 18
- Greens: Bent grass
- Fairways: Bent grass
- Website: golftheoaks.com
- Designed by: Greg Martin

The Oaks Golf Course is a public, 18-hole layout located in Cottage Grove, Wisconsin, United States. It opened in 2003. It was named one of Golf Digest magazine's "best new courses" in 2004.

The course has six par 3s, five par 5s, and nine par 4s for a total par of 71. The Oaks uses bent grass for its tees, fairways, and greens and was designed with the natural landscape in mind, according to course architect Greg Martin.
