= Marian University (Wisconsin) =

Catholic university in Fond du Lac, Wisconsin, US

- Former name: Marian College of Fond du Lac (1936–2008)
- Motto: sicut lilium inter spinas
- Motto in English: As a lily among thorns
- Type: Private university
- Established: 1936; 90 years ago
- Religious affiliation: Roman Catholic
- President: Aaron Sadoff
- Students: 1,319 (fall 2023)
- Undergraduates: 1,074 (fall 2023)
- Postgraduates: 245 (fall 2023)
- Location: Fond du Lac, Wisconsin, U.S. 43.7775°N 88.4214°W
- Campus: 78 acres (32 ha)
- Colors: blue and white
- Nickname: The Sabres
- Sporting affiliations: NCAA DIII –: NACC; CCIW
- Mascot: Sammy the Sabre
- Website: marianuniversity.edu
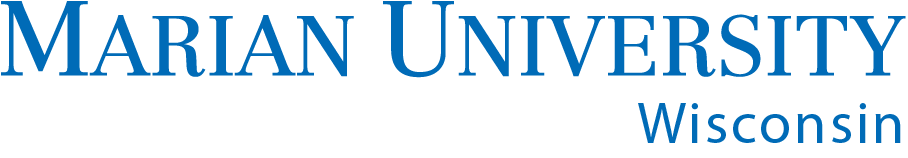

Marian University is a private Catholic university in Fond du Lac, Wisconsin, United States. It was founded in 1936 by the Congregation of Sisters of Saint Agnes, which continues to sponsor the university today.

Marian University has an enrollment of approximately 2,000 undergraduate and graduate students. Seventy-one percent of students are women. Ninety-four percent of students receive financial aid. Approximately 32% of undergraduate students live on campus.

== History ==
Marian University opened as Marian College of Fond du Lac, Wisconsin on September 8, 1936, with 17 full-time and 25 part-time students and eight faculty. The Congregation of Sisters of St. Agnes founded the college in response to a Wisconsin Department of Instruction decision that nuns were not allowed to teach in public schools while wearing their religious habits.

Marian became accredited to offer an undergraduate degree in elementary education in 1941. The first graduating class in August 1941 had eight nun graduates. The first lay students graduated in 1942. Although Marian was founded as a women's college, the male superintendent of Fond du Lac schools attended art and music classes with his wife in 1940. Marian had 86 full-time and 145 part-time students in 1950 who attended classes in a convent next to St. Agnes Hospital. Increasing enrollment caused the college to move to its current 100 acres (40 ha) campus on Fond du Lac's east side in the mid-1960s. The college became co-educational in 1970.

The school became accredited by the North Central Association for a Master of Arts program in 1987.

On May 1, 2008, Marian College of Fond du Lac changed its name to Marian University to reflect an expansion of its programs and classes and to position the institution for continued growth.

In 2021, the college was sanctioned by the American Association of University Professors "for infringement of governance standards".

On November 9, 2026, Marian University announced an agreement to be acquired by Alvernia University, a Catholic institution based in Reading, Pennsylvania.

== Academics ==
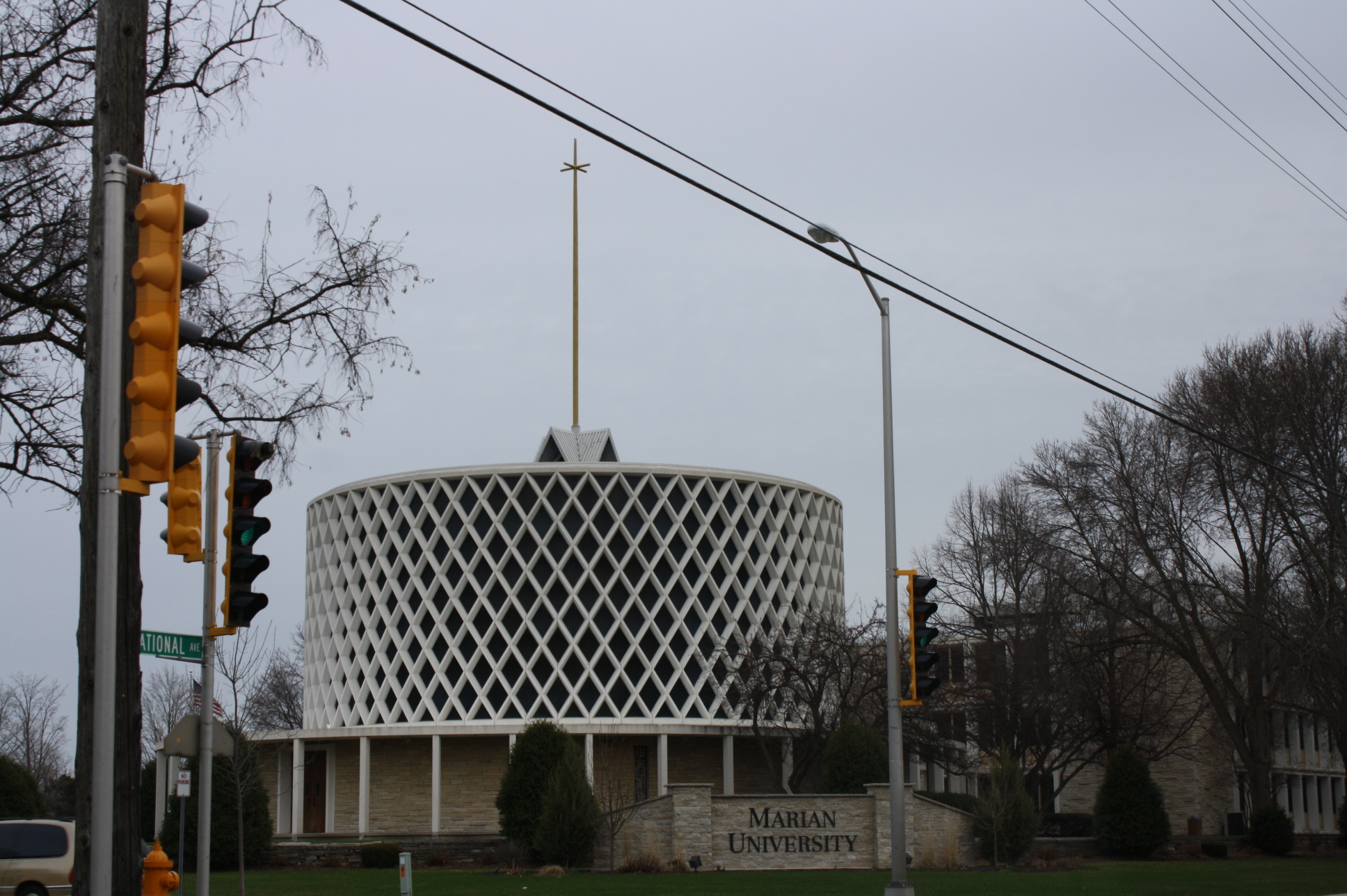
Dorcas Chapel

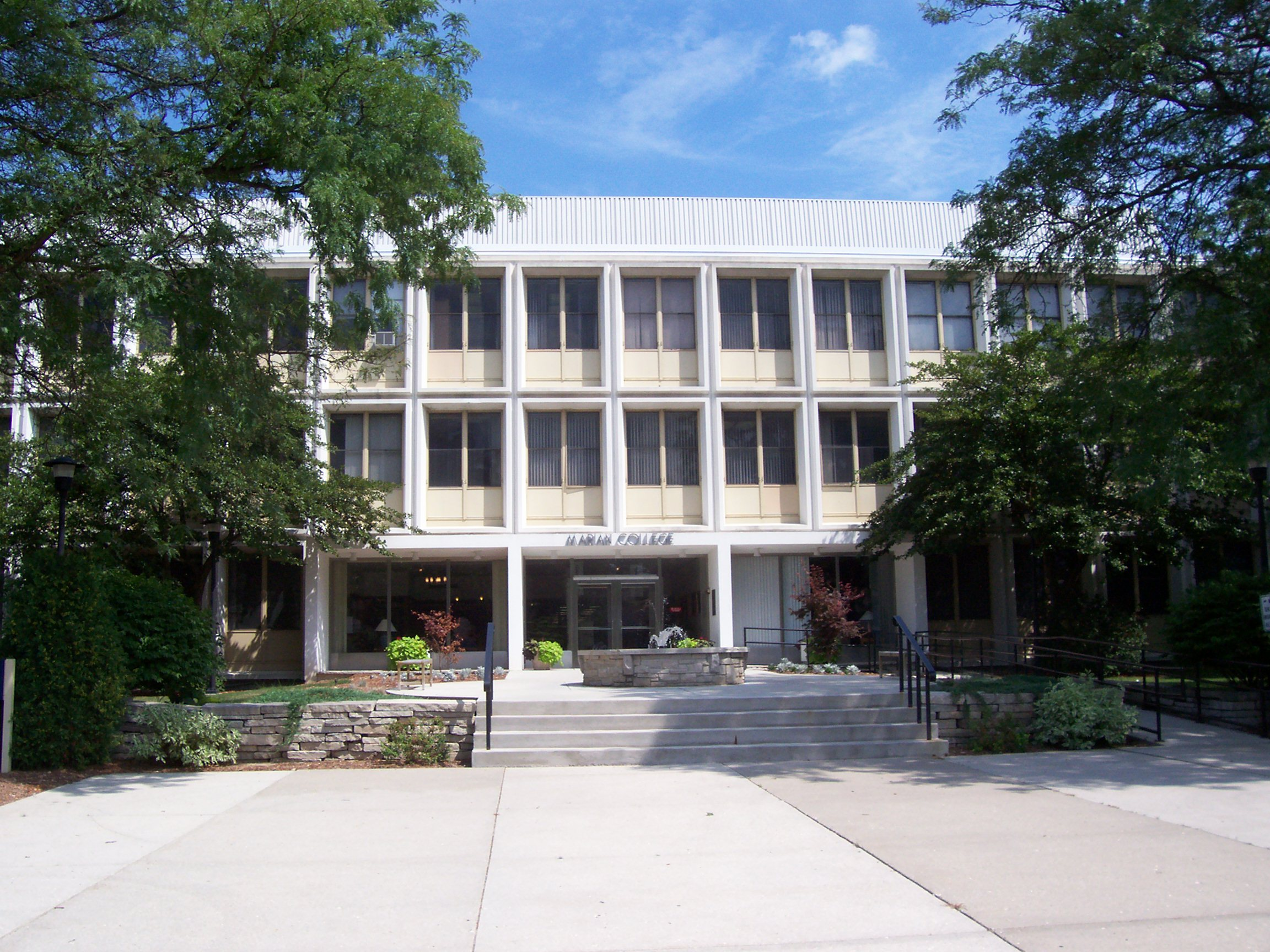
Agnes Hazotte Hall

Marian University consists of two colleges, namely the College of the Professions and the College of Arts, Sciences and Letters.

Marian University offers the BA, BS, and MA degrees, as well as a variety of licensures and certificates. It also offers an RN to BSN degree. Degrees can be obtained on campus or online.

Marian University is accredited by the Higher Learning Commission. Specific programs or academic units are also accredited by the International Assembly for Collegiate Business Education, National League for Nursing, Council on Social Work Education, Council for the Accreditation of Educator Preparation, and the Commission on Collegiate Nursing Education. Marian's curriculum has been approved by the Wisconsin Department of Public Instruction and Wisconsin State Board of Nursing and certified by the Wisconsin Department of Justice Law Enforcement Standards Board Training and Standards Bureau.

== Catholic environment ==
Undergraduate students are required to take six credits (two courses) in theology and three credits (one course) in philosophy. Graduate-level programs include courses that are grounded in Catholic teaching.

The Campus Ministry at Marian University provides many activities for students to deepen their understanding of the Catholic tradition: weekly Mass, retreats, sacraments, scripture study, rosary, adoration of the Blessed Sacrament, and outreach to the local area.

== Publications ==
45 South is Marian University's literary magazine. The Sabre is its online newspaper.

== Athletics ==
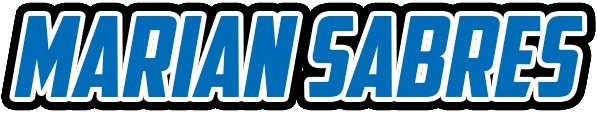
Marian Sabres wordmark

Marian University's athletic team's nickname is the Sabres. Its colors are blue and white.

Students participate in sports at the NCAA Division III level in women's basketball, bowling, cross country, field hockey, flag football, golf, ice hockey, lacrosse, soccer, softball, tennis, track & field, and volleyball, and men's baseball, basketball, cross country, golf, ice hockey, lacrosse, soccer, track & field, and volleyball. Teams have held membership in the Northern Athletics Collegiate Conference since 2006, after holding membership in the Lake Michigan Conference from 1974 to 2006.

Marian University's men's ice hockey team participates in the Northern Collegiate Hockey Association. Women's ice hockey is a member of the Northern Collegiate Hockey Association, and the men's volleyball team competes in the Midwest Collegiate Volleyball League. Since starting an intercollegiate athletic program in 1972, the Sabres have won 62 conference titles. Since joining the NCAA in 1997, seven different programs have competed in the NCAA Division III National Tournament.

Marian University plays its home baseball games at Herr-Baker Field, which has also been the home of the Fond du Lac Dock Spiders since 2017. The Dock Spiders play collegiate summer baseball in the Northwoods League.

== Notable alumni ==
- Dianne Bergant (1961) – author and scripture scholar
- Amy Sue Vruwink (1997) – member of the Wisconsin State Assembly
