= Northern Athletics Collegiate Conference =

Athletic conference in North America

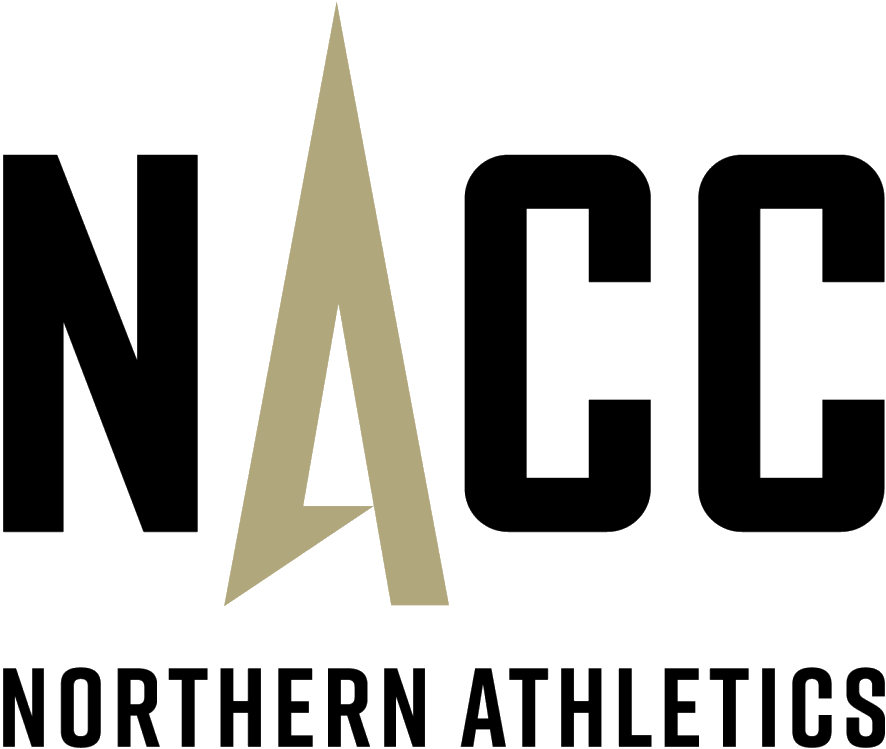
- Formerly: Northern Athletics Conference
- Association: NCAA
- Founded: 2006
- Commissioner: Jeff Ligney (since 2020)
- Sports fielded: 21; men's: 11; women's: 10
- Division: Division III
- No. of teams: 13 (12 in 2027)
- Headquarters: Milwaukee, Wisconsin
- Region: Upper Midwest
- Website: naccsports.org

Locations
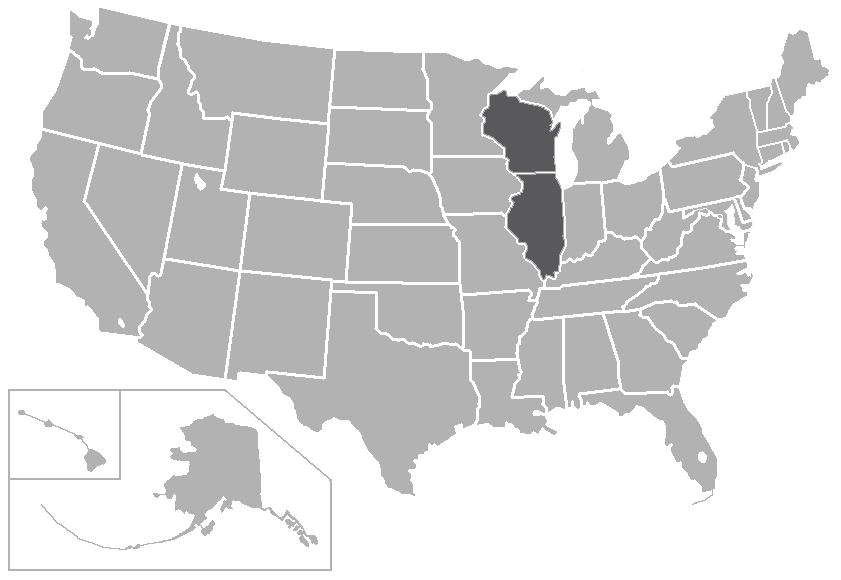

The Northern Athletics Collegiate Conference (NACC), formerly the Northern Athletics Conference (NAC), is an intercollegiate athletic conference. It participates in the NCAA's Division III and began its first season in the fall of 2006.

The NACC sponsors 21 sports. Men's sports include baseball, basketball, cross country, football, golf, lacrosse, soccer, tennis, indoor track & field, outdoor track & field, and volleyball. Women's squads are fielded in basketball, cross country, golf, lacrosse, soccer, softball, tennis, indoor track & field, outdoor track & field and volleyball. The newest NACC sports are men's volleyball, added in the 2017–18 school year, and men's and women's lacrosse, added in the 2020-21 school year.

The NACC became eligible for automatic NCAA postseason berths in 2008–09.

== History ==
Northern Athletics Collegiate Conference
Location of NACC members: current, departing

The Northern Athletics Collegiate Conference began its first season of competition in the fall of 2006 as the Northern Athletics Conference. The name change took place at the beginning of the 2013–14 academic year. The NACC consists of 13 colleges and universities from the shared-border states of Illinois and Wisconsin. Many have shared traditional rivalries dating back to the NACC's predecessor conferences: the Lake Michigan Conference and the Northern Illinois-Iowa Conference.

Charter members include: Alverno College, Aurora University, Benedictine University, Concordia University Chicago, Concordia University Wisconsin, Dominican University, Edgewood University, Lakeland University, Maranatha Baptist University, Marian University, Rockford University and Wisconsin Lutheran College.

Just three changes to the league's core membership have occurred, as the Milwaukee School of Engineering joined the NACC in the fall of 2007, and Maranatha withdrew from the league in the summer of 2013. In 2017, the Illinois Institute of Technology announced that they would be joining the NACC for the 2018 athletic season, coinciding with their acceptance as a full NCAA Division III member.

Also in 2017, Benedictine, which had been contemplating a move to NCAA Division II, was formally invited to join the D-II Great Lakes Valley Conference (GLVC), pending NCAA approval of its entry into the D-II transition process. Benedictine formally applied to begin this transition in advance of a February 1, 2018 deadline, and was officially approved to enter the transition process in July of that year. In October 2018, Benedictine reversed course and rescinded its request to withdraw from the NACC.

The most recent membership change was announced on April 3, 2019, when St. Norbert College, already slated to become an affiliate member in men's volleyball (and, subsequently, men's and women's golf) in 2019–20, was upgraded to full NACC membership effective in 2021–22.

On April 17, 2024, four institutions joined the NACC as affiliate members for lacrosse, effective in the 2025 spring season. The following schools were Cornell College, Lake Forest College and Lawrence University for men's and women's lacrosse, and the University of Dubuque for only men's lacrosse. Lawrence was introducing both sports, while Cornell, Dubuque, and Lake Forest had been members of the Midwest Lacrosse Conference / Midwest Women's Lacrosse Conference.

=== Chronological timeline ===
- 2006 – The NACC was founded as the Northern Athletics Conference (NAC). Charter members include: Alverno College, Concordia University Wisconsin, Dominican University, Edgewood College (now Edgewood University), Lakeland College (now Lakeland University), Maranatha Baptist Bible College (now Maranatha Baptist University), Marian University and Wisconsin Lutheran College [from the Lake Michigan Conference (LMC)], and Aurora University, Benedictine University, Concordia University Chicago and Rockford College [now Rockford University; from the Northern Illinois-Iowa Conference (NIIC)], beginning the 2006–07 academic year.
- 2007 – The Milwaukee School of Engineering (MSoE) (also a former member from the defunct Lake Michigan Conference) joined the NAC after spending a season as an NCAA D-III Independent school in the 2007–08 academic year.
- 2011 – Bethany Lutheran College, Martin Luther College, the University of Minnesota Morris, University of Northwestern – St. Paul and Presentation College joined the NAC as affiliate members for women's golf in the 2012 spring season (2011–12 academic year).
- 2012 – Presentation left the NAC as an affiliate member for women's golf to return to the National Association of Intercollegiate Athletics (NAIA) after the 2012 spring season (2011–12 academic year).
- 2013:
  - Maranatha Baptist left the NAC to become an NCAA D-III Independent school after the 2012–13 academic year.
  - The NAC was rebranded as the Northern Athletics Collegiate Conference (NACC), beginning the 2013–14 school year.
  - Northland College joined the NACC as an affiliate member for women's golf in the 2014 spring season (2013–14 academic year).
- 2015:
  - Bethany Lutheran, Minnesota–Morris, Northwestern (Minn.) and Northland left the NACC as affiliate members for women's golf after the 2015 spring season (2014–15 academic year).
  - Mount Mary University joined the NACC as an affiliate member for women's cross country in the 2015 fall season (2015–16 academic year).
- 2018:
  - The Illinois Institute of Technology (Illinois Tech) joined the NACC in the 2018–19 academic year.
  - Eureka College joined the NACC as an affiliate member for football in the 2018 fall season (2018–19 academic year).
- 2019 – St. Norbert College joined the NACC as an affiliate member for men's volleyball, men's golf and women's golf in the 2019–20 academic year.
- 2021:
  - St. Norbert had upgraded to join the NACC for all sports in the 2021–22 academic year.
  - Beloit College joined the NACC as an affiliate member for men's and women's lacrosse in the 2022 spring season (2021–22 academic year).
- 2024 – Four institutions joined the NACC as affiliate members, all effective in the 2025 spring season (2024–25 academic year):
  - Cornell College, Lake Forest College and Lawrence University for men's and women's lacrosse
  - and the University of Dubuque for men's lacrosse
- 2026 – Alverno left the NACC to join the Coast to Coast Athletic Conference (C2C), beginning the 2026–27 academic year.
- 2027 – Concordia–Wisconsin will leave the NACC to join the College Conference of Illinois and Wisconsin (CCIW), beginning the 2027–28 academic year.

== Member schools ==
=== Current members ===
The NACC currently has 13 full members, all are private schools:

Member departing for the College Conference of Illinois and Wisconsin on July 1, 2027.

Institution	Location	Founded	Affiliation	Undergraduate enrollment	Nickname	Joined (Note: Represents the calendar year when fall sports competition begins.)	Colors	Football?
Aurora University	Aurora, Illinois	1893	Nonsectarian	2,309	Spartans	2006	Royal Blue & White	Yes
Benedictine University	Lisle, Illinois	1887	Catholic (Benedictines)	3,123	Eagles	2006	Cardinal & White	Yes
Concordia University Chicago	River Forest, Illinois	1864	Lutheran LCMS	1,361	Cougars	2006	Maroon & Gold	Yes
Concordia University Wisconsin	Mequon, Wisconsin	1880	Lutheran LCMS	2,473	Falcons	2006	Blue & Gold	Yes
Dominican University	River Forest, Illinois	1901	Catholic (Dominican)	1,697	Stars	2006	Royal Blue, Black, & White	No
Edgewood University	Madison, Wisconsin	1927	Catholic (S.D.S.)	1,570	Eagles	2006	Black, White, & Red	No
Illinois Institute of Technology	Chicago, Illinois	1890	Nonsectarian	3,135	Scarlet Hawks	2018	Red, Gray & Black	No
Lakeland University	Plymouth, Wisconsin	1862	United Church of Christ	1,023	Muskies	2006	Navy Blue & Gold	Yes
Marian University	Fond du Lac, Wisconsin	1936	Catholic (C.S.S.A.)	1,497	Sabres	2006	Royal Blue & Gold	No
Milwaukee School of Engineering	Milwaukee, Wisconsin	1903	Nonsectarian	2,122	Raiders	2007	Cardinal & White	No
Rockford University	Rockford, Illinois	1847	Nonsectarian	1,181	Regents	2006	Purple & White	Yes
St. Norbert College	De Pere, Wisconsin	1898	Catholic (Premonstratensians)	2,180	Green Knights	2021 (Note: St. Norbert was an affiliate member of the NACC for men's volleyball, men's golf and women's golf during its final two years as a full core member of the Midwest Conference (MWC) from 2019–20 to 2020–21.)	Green & Gold	Yes
Wisconsin Lutheran College	Milwaukee, Wisconsin	1973	Lutheran WELS	917	Warriors	2006	Forest Green & White	Yes

=== Affiliate members ===
The NACC currently has six affiliate members, all are private schools:

Institution	Location	Founded	Affiliation	Undergraduate enrollment	Nickname	Joined (Note: Represents the calendar year when fall sports competition begins.)	Colors	NACC sport(s)	Primary conference
Beloit College	Beloit, Wisconsin	1846	Nonsectarian	1,358	Buccaneers	2021	College Blue & Vegas Gold	Men's lacrosse	Midwest (MWC)
Beloit College	Beloit, Wisconsin	1846	Nonsectarian	1,358	Buccaneers	2021	College Blue & Vegas Gold	Women's lacrosse	Midwest (MWC)
Cornell College	Mount Vernon, Iowa	1853	United; Methodist	1,176	Rams	2024	Purple & White	Men's lacrosse	Midwest (MWC)
Cornell College	Mount Vernon, Iowa	1853	United; Methodist	1,176	Rams	2024	Purple & White	Women's lacrosse	Midwest (MWC)
University of Dubuque	Dubuque, Iowa	1852	Presbyterian	1,361	Spartans	2024	Navy Blue & White	Men's lacrosse	American Rivers (A-R-C)
Eureka College	Eureka, Illinois	1855	Disciples of Christ	680	Red Devils	2018	Maroon & Gold	Football	St. Louis (SLIAC)
Lake Forest College	Lake Forest, Illinois	1857	Nonsectarian	1,395	Foresters	2024	Red & Black	Men's lacrosse	Midwest (MWC)
Lake Forest College	Lake Forest, Illinois	1857	Nonsectarian	1,395	Foresters	2024	Red & Black	Women's lacrosse	Midwest (MWC)
Lawrence University	Appleton, Wisconsin	1847	Nonsectarian	1,489	Vikings	2024	Blue & Grey & White	Men's lacrosse	Midwest (MWC)
Lawrence University	Appleton, Wisconsin	1847	Nonsectarian	1,489	Vikings	2024	Blue & Grey & White	Women's lacrosse	Midwest (MWC)

=== Former member ===
The NACC had two former full members, both private schools:

Institution	Location	Founded	Affiliation	Undergraduate enrollment	Nickname	Joined (Note: Represents the calendar year when fall sports competition begins.)	Left (Note: Represents the calendar year when spring sports competition ends.)	Colors	Current conference
Alverno College (Note: Alverno is a women's college, therefore it does not compete in men's sports.)	Milwaukee, Wisconsin	1887	Catholic (S.S.S.F.)	1,664	Inferno	2006	2026	Red, White, & Black	Coast to Coast (C2C)
Maranatha Baptist University	Watertown, Wisconsin	1968	Baptist	765	Sabercats	2006	2013	Navy Blue, Gold, & Crimson	D-III Independent

=== Former affiliate members ===
The NACC had seven former affiliate members, all were private schools:

Institution	Location	Founded	Affiliation	Undergraduate enrollment	Nickname	Joined (Note: Represents the calendar year when fall sports competition begins.)	Left (Note: Represents the calendar year when spring sports competition ends.)	NACC sport(s)	Primary conference
Bethany Lutheran College	Mankato, Minnesota	1927	Lutheran ELS	550	Vikings	2011	2015	Women's golf	Upper Midwest (UMAC)
Martin Luther College	New Ulm, Minnesota	1995	Lutheran WELS	800	Knights	2011	2012	Women's golf	Upper Midwest (UMAC)
University of Minnesota Morris	Morris, Minnesota	1960	Public	1,900	Cougars	2011	2015	Women's golf	Upper Midwest (UMAC)
Mount Mary University	Milwaukee, Wisconsin	1913	Catholic (SSND)	529	Blue Angels	2015	2016	Women's tennis	Chicagoland (CCAC) (Note: Currently an NAIA athletic conference.)
Mount Mary University	Milwaukee, Wisconsin	1913	Catholic (SSND)	529	Blue Angels	2015	2025	Women's cross country	Chicagoland (CCAC)
Northland College	Ashland, Wisconsin	1906	UCC & Cong.	700	LumberJacks & LumberJills	2013	2015	Women's golf	Closed in 2025
University of Northwestern – St. Paul	Roseville, Minnesota	1902	Nondenominational	2,944	Eagles	2011	2015	Women's golf	Upper Midwest (UMAC)
Presentation College	Aberdeen, South Dakota	1951	Catholic	786	Saints	2011	2012	Women's golf	Closed in 2023

=== Membership timeline ===
Full member (all sports) Full member (non-football) Associate member (football) Associate member (sport)

== Sports ==
A divisional format is used for baseball, basketball (M / W), softball, and volleyball (W) from 2008–09 to 2012–13 and during 2020–21.
North
- Concordia–Wisconsin
- Edgewood
- Lakeland
- Marian
- MSOE
- St. Norbert
- Wisconsin Lutheran
South
- Alverno
- Aurora
- Benedictine
- Concordia–Chicago
- Dominican
- Illinois Tech
- Rockford

Teams in Northern Athletics Collegiate Conference competition
Sport	Men's	Women's
Baseball	13	
Basketball	13	14
Cross Country	13	14
Football	9	
Golf	10	10
Lacrosse	11	10
Soccer	13	14
Softball		13
Tennis	7	9
Track & Field (Indoor)	13	13
Track & Field (Outdoor)	13	13
Volleyball	13	14

=== Men's sponsored sports by school ===
School	Baseball	Basketball	Cross Country	Football	Golf	Lacrosse	Soccer	Tennis	Track & Field (Indoor)	Track & Field (Outdoor)	Volleyball	Total NACC Sports
Aurora	Yes	Yes	Yes	Yes	Yes	Yes	Yes	No	Yes	Yes	Yes	10
Benedictine	Yes	Yes	Yes	Yes	Yes	Yes	Yes	No	Yes	Yes	Yes	10
CUC	Yes	Yes	Yes	Yes	No	No	Yes	Yes	Yes	Yes	Yes	9
CUW	Yes	Yes	Yes	Yes	Yes	Yes	Yes	Yes	Yes	Yes	Yes	11
Dominican	Yes	Yes	Yes	No	Yes	No	Yes	No	Yes	Yes	Yes	8
Edgewood	Yes	Yes	Yes	No	Yes	Yes	Yes	Yes	Yes	Yes	Yes	10
IIT	Yes	Yes	Yes	No	No	Yes	Yes	Yes	Yes	Yes	Yes	9
Lakeland	Yes	Yes	Yes	Yes	Yes	No	Yes	No	Yes	Yes	Yes	10
Marian	Yes	Yes	Yes	No	Yes	Yes	Yes	No	Yes	Yes	Yes	9
MSOE	Yes	Yes	Yes	No	Yes	Yes	Yes	Yes	Yes	Yes	Yes	10
Rockford	Yes	Yes	Yes	Yes	No	No	Yes	No	Yes	Yes	Yes	8
St. Norbert	Yes	Yes	Yes	Yes	Yes	No	Yes	Yes	Yes	Yes	Yes	10
Wisconsin Lutheran	Yes	Yes	Yes	Yes	Yes	No	Yes	Yes	Yes	Yes	Yes	10
Associate Members
Beloit						Yes						1
Cornell (IA)						Yes						1
Eureka				Yes								1
Lake Forest						Yes					Yes	2
Lawrence						Yes						1
Totals	13	13	13	8+1	10	7+4	13	7	13	13	13+1	124+6

Men's varsity sports not sponsored by the Northern Athletics Collegiate Conference which are played by NACC schools:

School	Ice Hockey	Rowing	Swimming & Diving	Wrestling
Aurora	NCHA			CCIW
CUW	NCHA			CCIW
IIT			LAC	
Lakeland				IND
Marian	NCHA			
MSOE	NCHA	IND	MWC	CCIW
St. Norbert	NCHA		MWC	

=== Women's sponsored sports by school ===
School	Basketball	Cross Country	Golf	Lacrosse	Soccer	Softball	Tennis	Track & Field (Indoor)	Track & Field (Outdoor)	Volleyball	Total NACC Sports
Aurora	Yes	Yes	Yes	Yes	Yes	Yes	No	Yes	Yes	Yes	9
Benedictine	Yes	Yes	Yes	No	Yes	Yes	No	Yes	Yes	Yes	8
CUC	Yes	Yes	No	No	Yes	Yes	Yes	Yes	Yes	Yes	8
CUW	Yes	Yes	Yes	Yes	Yes	Yes	Yes	Yes	Yes	Yes	10
Dominican	Yes	Yes	No	No	Yes	Yes	No	Yes	Yes	Yes	7
Edgewood	Yes	Yes	Yes	Yes	Yes	Yes	Yes	Yes	Yes	Yes	10
IIT	Yes	Yes	No	Yes	Yes	No	Yes	Yes	Yes	Yes	8
Lakeland	Yes	Yes	Yes	No	Yes	Yes	No	Yes	Yes	Yes	9
Marian	Yes	Yes	Yes	Yes	Yes	Yes	Yes	Yes	Yes	Yes	10
MSOE	Yes	Yes	Yes	Yes	Yes	Yes	Yes	Yes	Yes	Yes	10
Rockford	Yes	Yes	No	No	Yes	Yes	No	Yes	Yes	Yes	7
St. Norbert	Yes	Yes	Yes	No	Yes	Yes	Yes	Yes	Yes	Yes	9
Wisconsin Lutheran	Yes	Yes	Yes	No	Yes	Yes	Yes	Yes	Yes	Yes	9
Associate Members
Beloit				Yes							1
Cornell (IA)				Yes							1
Lake Forest				Yes							1
Lawrence				Yes							1
Totals	13	13	9	6+4	13	12	8	13	13	13	114+4

Women's varsity sports not sponsored by the Northern Athletics Collegiate Conference which are played by NACC schools:

School	Acrobatics & Tumbling	Bowling	Field Hockey	Flag Football	Ice Hockey	Rowing	Swimming & Diving	Triathlon	Wrestling
Aurora		CCIW		Yes	NCHA				CCIW
Benedictine				Yes					
CUW	NCATA		CFHC		NCHA			Yes	
Edgewood		IND							
IIT							LAC		
Lakeland									IND
Marian		CCIW	CFHC		NCHA				
MSOE					NCHA	IND	MWC		CCIW
Rockford		IND		Yes					
St. Norbert					NCHA		MWC		
