= Lakeland University =

Private university outside Sheboygan, Wisconsin, US

Coordinates: 43°50′32″N 87°53′01″W

- Former names: Mission House College (1862–1956); Lakeland College (1956–2016)
- Type: Private university
- Established: 1862; 164 years ago
- Affiliations: United Church of Christ
- Endowment: $18.2 million (2025)
- President: Beth Borgen
- Academic staff: 41 Full-time & 181 Part-time
- Students: 2,511
- Undergraduates: 1,787
- Postgraduates: 724
- Location: Herman, Wisconsin, United States
- Campus: 240 acres (97 ha)
- Colors
- Nickname: Muskies
- Sporting affiliations: Division III - NACC; CCIW
- Mascot: Musko
- Website: lakeland.edu
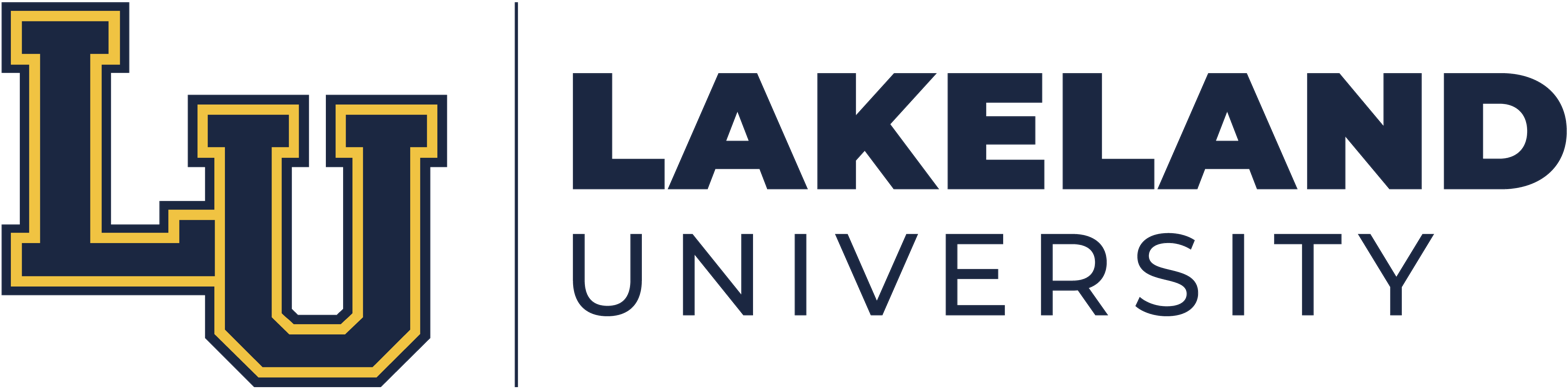

Lakeland University is a private university affiliated with the United Church of Christ, with its main campus in Herman, Wisconsin, United States, and seven evening, weekend, and online centers located throughout the state of Wisconsin, in Pewaukee, Madison, Wisconsin Rapids, Chippewa Falls, Neenah, Green Bay, and Sheboygan. Lakeland also has a four-year international campus in Tokyo.

== History ==
Lakeland traces its beginnings to German immigrants who, seeking a new life, traveled to America and settled in the Sheboygan area. In 1862, the founders built Missionshaus (Mission House), a combined academy-college-seminary. The school was called Mission House College and Seminary until 1956 when it adopted the name Lakeland College and began focusing on a liberal arts education. The seminary combined with the Yankton Theological School to become United Theological Seminary of the Twin Cities and relocated to Minneapolis/St. Paul in 1962.

In 1978, Lakeland launched the state's first degree-completion program for working adults by offering evening classes. Today, Lakeland's Evening, Weekend & Online program enrolls more than 2,000 graduate and undergraduate students. In 1991, Lakeland founded a campus in Tokyo, Japan and in 2005 it was recognized as an overseas campus, allowing it to sponsor visas for students.

On July 1, 2016, Lakeland College became Lakeland University. This change resulted in the creation of three schools, a School of Business & Entrepreneurship; a School of Science, Technology & Education; and a School of Humanities and Fine Arts as well as new academic offerings. The change was fueled by many factors, including desire to increase international recruitment and clear up confusion with Lakeshore Technical College, a neighboring institution. In the fall of 2017, Lakeland launched a cooperative education model which allows Lakeland students to gain 12–18 months of professional work experience with local companies, along with the ability to earn more than $100,000 to minimize post-graduate student debt.

== Academics ==
Lakeland University is a bachelor's and master's degree-granting university related to (though not controlled by) the United Church of Christ with nearly 3,500 students (850 traditional undergraduate students and 2,600 evening, weekend and online students) from 24 countries, 10 on-campus residence halls and more than 30 majors.

Lakeland University offers 10 undergraduate majors and three graduate degrees. Courses typically meet once per week during evening hours, over 14-week semesters in the fall and spring and over 10-week semesters in the summer. With its BlendEd format, students always have the option of attending classes in person or accessing courses and completing their work entirely online.

== Campuses ==
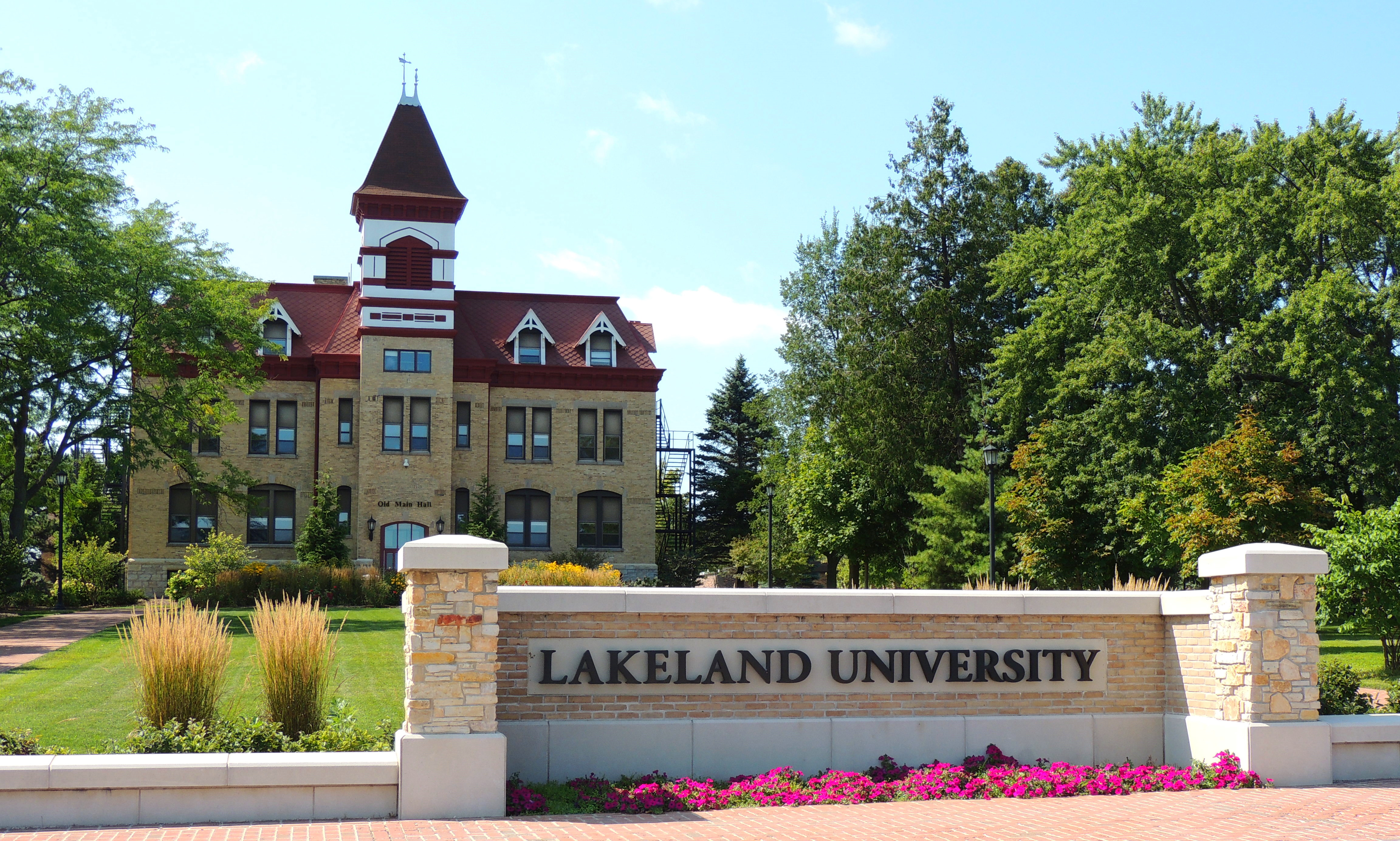
The front of Lakeland University from South Drive

In addition to the main campus in Plymouth, Lakeland has seven evening, weekend and online centers, located in Pewaukee, Madison, Wisconsin Rapids (Central Wisconsin), Chippewa Falls, Fox Cities, Green Bay, Sheboygan. The university also has an international campus in Tokyo, Japan.

=== Centers ===
The university has centers located throughout Wisconsin:

- Central Wisconsin Center (Wisconsin Rapids, WI at Mid-State Technical College)
- Chippewa Valley Center (Chippewa Falls, WI)
- Fox Cities Center (Appleton, WI at Fox Valley Technical College)
- Green Bay Center (Green Bay, WI)
- Madison Center (Madison, WI)
- Sheboygan Center (Plymouth, WI on Lakeland's main campus)
- Waukesha County Center (Pewaukee, WI at Waukesha County Technical College)

A location previously existed in Milwaukee, but was replaced by the Waukesha County Center.

== Athletics ==
Lakeland University teams (nicknamed Muskies) participate in the National Collegiate Athletic Association's Division III. The Muskies are a member of the Northern Athletics Collegiate Conference (NACC). Lakeland was a former member of the Lake Michigan Conference until the spring of 2006. Men's sports include baseball, basketball, cross country, football, golf, soccer, tennis, track & field, volleyball and wrestling. Women's sports include basketball, cross country, golf, soccer, softball, tennis, track & field, volleyball, and Wisconsin's first intercollegiate women's wrestling team. Lakeland's official colors are navy blue and gold.

Lakeland Men's Volleyball won the National Intramural-Recreational Sports Administration National Championship in 2008.

== Notable alumni ==
- Sam Alvey, Mixed martial artist, competing in the Ultimate Fighting Championship
- Pat Curran, NFL player
- Jeanna Giese, first unvaccinated survivor of rabies
- Elmer George Homrighausen, dean of Princeton Theological Seminary, American theologian
- Calvin Potter, senator, Wisconsin State Senate
- Victor Paul Wierwille, founder of The Way International

== See also ==
- Japan Campus of Foreign Universities
