= Northern Illinois-Iowa Conference =

Defunct NCAA Division III athletic conference

The Northern Illinois-Iowa Conference (NIIC) was a college athletic conference affiliated with the National Collegiate Athletic Association (NCAA) at the Division III level. Member schools transitioned from the NAIA ranks during the early 1980s. The conference was formed in 1969 (56 years ago). Member institutions were located in the Midwestern United States in the states of Illinois and Iowa. After the 2005–06 academic year, the NIIC merged with the Lake Michigan Conference to form a new league called the Northern Athletics Conference (now known as the Northern Athletics Collegiate Conference).

== Member schools ==
=== Final members ===
Institution	Location	Founded	Affiliation	Enrollment	Nickname	Joined	Left	Subsequent conference(s)	Current conference
Aurora University (Note: Charter member.)	Aurora, Illinois	1893	Nonsectarian	2,309	Spartans	1970	2006	Northern (NACC) (2006–present)	
Benedictine University	Lisle, Illinois	1887	Catholic (Benedictines)	2,740	Eagles	1969	2006	Northern (NACC) (2006–present)	
Clarke University	Dubuque, Iowa	1843	Catholic (B.V.M.)	1,075	Crusaders (Note: Clarke is now competing as the Pride since the 2017–18 school year.)	1988	2006	NAIA Independent (2006–07; 2015–16); Midwest (MCC) (2007–15)	Heart of America (HAAC) (Note: Currently an NAIA athletic conference.) (2016–present)
Concordia University Chicago	River Forest, Illinois	1864	Lutheran LCMS	1,361	Cougars	1969	2006	Northern (NACC) (2006–present)	
Dominican University	River Forest, Illinois	1901	Catholic (Dominican)	1,697	Stars	1990	2005	Lake Michigan (LMC) (2005)	Northern (NACC) (2006–present)
Eureka College	Eureka, Illinois	1855	Disciples of Christ	680	Red Devils	1996	2006	St. Louis (SLIAC) (2006–present)	
Rockford University	Rockford, Illinois	1847	Nonsectarian	1,272	Regents	1969	2006	Northern (NACC) (2006–present)	

=== Former members ===
Institution	Location	Founded	Affiliation	Enrollment	Nickname	Joined	Left	Subsequent conference(s)	Current conference
George Williams College (Note: Charter member.)	Williams Bay, Wisconsin	1890	Nondenominational	N/A	Indians	1970	1971	N/A (Note: George Williams closed and was merged into Aurora University in 2000.)	
Judson University	Elgin, Illinois	1963	Evangelical; Christian	1,231	Eagles	1973	1996	Chicagoland (CCAC) (Note: Currently an NAIA athletic conference.) (1996–present)	
Olivet Nazarene University	Bourbonnais, Illinois	1907	Nazarene	4,579	Tigers	1974	1996	Chicagoland (CCAC) (1996–present)	
Trinity International University	Deerfield, Illinois	1897	Evangelical; Christian	2,688	Trojans	1969	1996	Chicagoland (CCAC) (1996–2023)	N/A (Note: Trinity International closed their residential campus after 2022–2023 school year and now it only have online modalities.)
