= Benedictine University =

Catholic university in Lisle, Illinois, US

- Former names: St. Procopius College (1887–1971); Illinois Benedictine College (1971–1996)
- Motto: Ut In Omnibus Glorificetur Deus (Latin)
- Motto in English: That in all things God may be glorified
- Type: Private university
- Established: 1887; 139 years ago
- Religious affiliation: Catholic (Benedictine)
- Academic affiliations: ABCU (Note: Acronym for "Association of Benedictine Colleges and Universities".); ACCU; NAICU; CIC
- President: Joseph J. Foy
- Provost: Katherine (Kate) Lang
- Students: 2,917 (fall 2024)
- Undergraduates: 1,972 (fall 2024)
- Postgraduates: 945 (fall 2024)
- Location: Lisle, Illinois, United States; 41°46′38″N 88°5′45″W
- Campus: Suburban, 108 acres (43.7 ha)
- Colors: (Red and white)
- Nicknames: Eagles (Lisle); Redhawks (Mesa)
- Sporting affiliations: Lisle: NCAA Division III – NACC; MLC; Mesa: NAIA – GSAC
- Mascots: Eagle, Redhawk
- Website: ben.edu
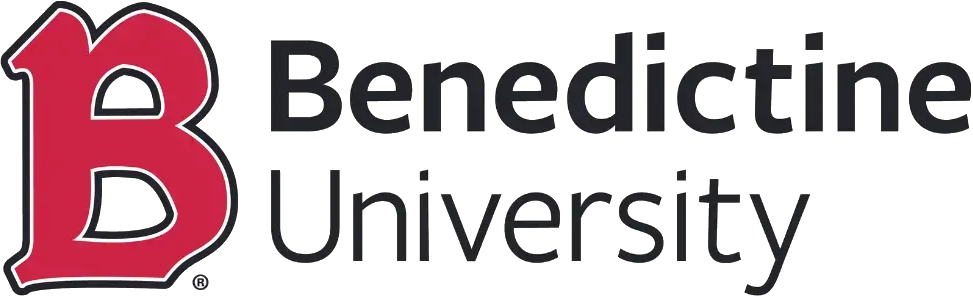

Benedictine University is a private Catholic university with campuses in Lisle, Illinois, and Mesa, Arizona, United States. It was founded in 1887 by the Benedictine monks of St. Procopius Abbey in the Pilsen community on the West Side of Chicago. The institution has retained a close relationship with the Benedictine Order, which bears the name of St. Benedict (480–543 A.D.), the acknowledged father of western monasticism.

The Lisle campus resides in the western Chicago metropolitan area, located near two national research facilities, Argonne National Laboratory and Fermi National Accelerator Laboratory.

== History ==
Benedictine University, also called BenU, was founded in 1887 as St. Procopius College by the Benedictine monks of St. Procopius Abbey, who lived in the Pilsen community of Chicago's West Side. The monks created the all-male institution just two years after their community began, with the intention of educating men of Czech and Slovak descent. While the school was called a college from its founding, it did not begin offering post-secondary courses until after it moved from Chicago to rural Lisle in 1901. It became fully accredited in 1957 and, as the area around it transitioned from rural to suburban, it grew substantially. Also in 1957, the institution's high school component began operating independently of the college and is now called Benet Academy. The college became fully coeducational in 1968, though the first female, Joan Hewitt, graduated in 1953.

The school changed its name to Illinois Benedictine College in 1971, and in 1996, it became Benedictine University. While the institution continued to grow in Lisle, it expanded its reach to include campuses in other cities, including Springfield, Illinois, in 2003 and Mesa, Arizona, in 2012. The university added the Kindlon Hall of Learning and the Birck Hall of Science in 2001 and the Neff Alumni Center in 2012, and in 2015, Benedictine opened the Daniel L. Goodwin Hall of Business, which features the Trading Lab and a 600-seat auditorium.

After recognizing that there is great demand for American business programs overseas, Benedictine joined forces with Shenyang University of Technology and Shenyang Jianzhu University in China to bring Master of Business Administration and Master of Science in Management Information Systems programs there.

The Springfield, Illinois branch campus of Benedictine University was founded in 1929 as a separate institution known as Springfield Junior College. The college changed its name in 1967 to Springfield College in Illinois. In early 2003, Springfield College in Illinois and Benedictine University formed a partnership through which Benedictine offered bachelor's, master's and doctoral degrees in Springfield. This partnership resulted in a merger between the two institutions; in 2010, Benedictine University established a branch campus named Benedictine University at Springfield and Springfield College in Illinois ceased all academic programs in August 2011. On February 27, 2018, the Benedictine University Board of Trustees and the Board of Springfield College in Illinois announced that the Springfield property would be offered for sale. As of the end of the 2018 spring semester, courses were no longer offered at the Springfield branch campus.

In 2024 Benedictine University cut 40 employees including both faculty and staff positions. President Foy stated that "This was the reality of the university for many years, operating well beyond what our resources were” according to the student newspaper.

=== Presidents ===
- Rev. Daniel Kucera, O.S.B. – a Benedictine who later became Archbishop of Dubuque, 1959–1965, 1971–1976.
- Richard C. Becker, Ph.D., 1976–1995
- William J. Carroll, Ph.D., 1995–2015
- Michael S. Brophy, Ph.D., 2015–2018
- Charles Gregory, 2018–2023
- Joseph J. Foy, Ph.D., 2023–Present

== Campuses ==
=== Lisle ===
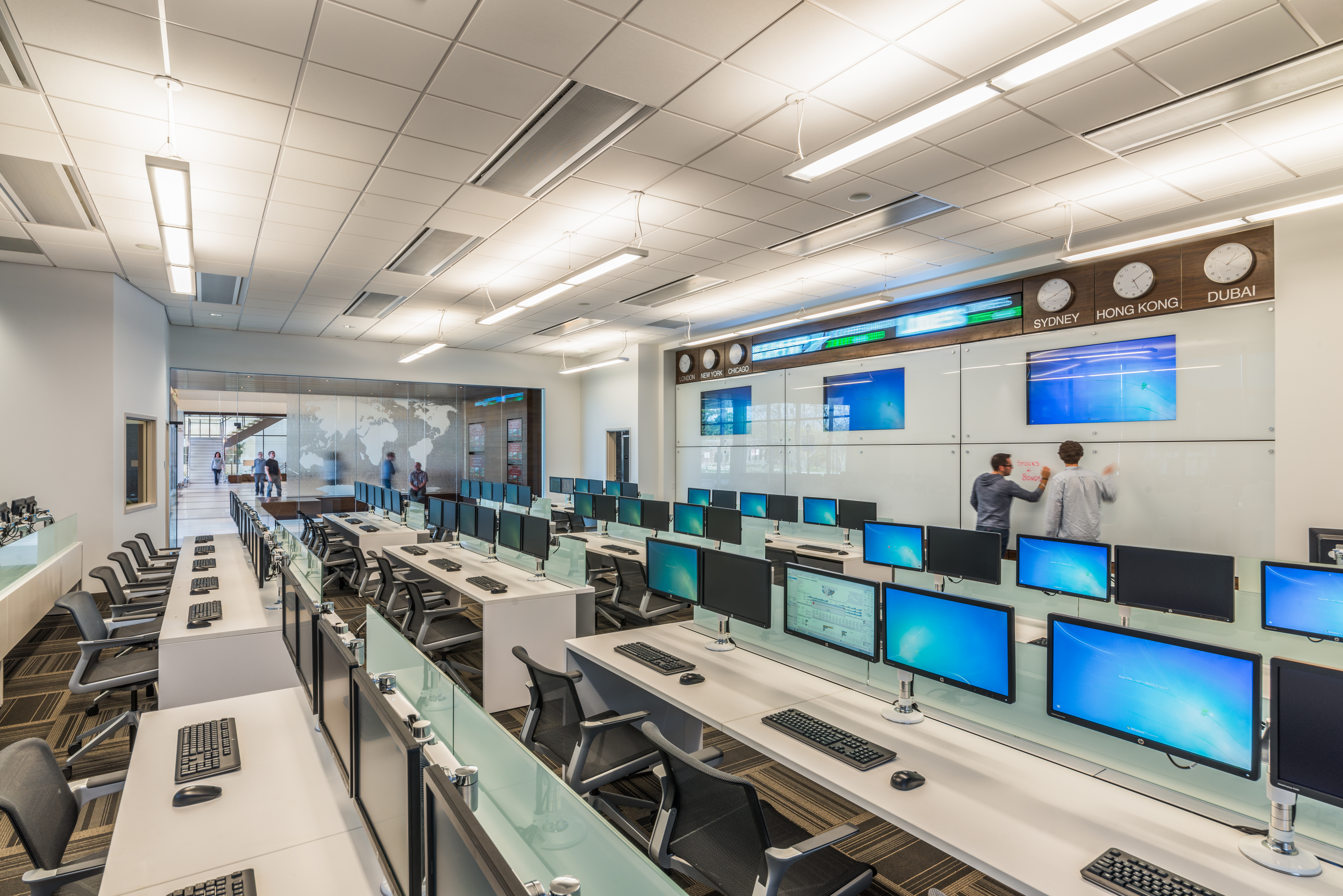
Daniel L. Goodwin Hall of Business

Benedictine University moved to Lisle, Illinois, in the far western suburbs of Chicago and DuPage County, in 1901. After the dedication of Benedictine Hall, new buildings were added throughout the early 1900s. Although it had admitted women from time to time, the college became fully coeducational in 1968. In 1971, it changed its name to Illinois Benedictine College. In response to community needs, graduate, doctorate and adult learner programs were added. In 1996, the college was renamed Benedictine University. The Birck Hall of Science and the Kindlon Hall of Learning were built in 2001. The Village of Lisle-Benedictine University Sports Complex, a unique cooperative venture between a governmental body and private university, was dedicated in 2005. Renovation of the Dan and Ada Rice Center was completed in October 2011.

The rapid growth of the Daniel L. Goodwin College of Business created the need for construction of the Daniel L. Goodwin Hall of Business – the largest classroom building on campus at 125,000 square feet – which houses the college's undergraduate and graduate business programs and doctoral programs in Organization Development and Values-Driven Leadership. The building also features classrooms, study areas, seminar rooms, offices, a 600-seat auditorium to facilitate lectures, a 40-seat real-time trading lab that provides hands-on investing experience, a 7,500-square-foot main hall and a café.

The Lisle campus' additionally features the Jurica-Suchy Nature Museum, a small natural history museum located on the second floor of the Birck Hall of Science. The museum represents the work of Frs. Edmund and Hilary Jurica, O.S.B., who collected specimens for their students to use during their almost 100 combined years of teaching at Benedictine University, and Fr. Theodore Suchy, O.S.B. (d. 2012), who served as museum curator for more than 30 years. The museum has continued to collect specimens since the Juricas' deaths in the early 1970s and now has a collection numbering more than 10,000 specimens ranging from small invertebrates to a rorqual skeleton. The Jurica-Suchy Nature Museum is open to the public as well as to school groups.

Benedictine's Lisle campus has 2,885 undergraduate students of which 44 percent are male and 56 percent are female, and the student body represents 50 states and territories, and 15 countries. Approximately one-third of the students are minority.

=== Mesa ===
Benedictine University Mesa, located in Mesa, Arizona, became the first four-year Catholic university in Arizona when classes began in 2013. Undergraduate majors include accounting, communication arts, computer science, criminal justice, fine arts, graphic arts and design, management and organizational behavior, nutrition, political science, psychology, theology and Spanish. As of 2019, the Mesa campus had 568 students, and 76 faculty and staff.

The university also provides degree-completion programs and graduate degrees.

Its athletic teams are known as the Redhawks and compete in the National Association of Intercollegiate Athletics as a member of the California Pacific Conference. Student athletes compete in men's and women's cross country, golf, basketball, soccer, baseball and softball, and volleyball, including women's beach volleyball.

In 2019, Mesa established a partnership with Co+Hoots, a private co-working business based in Phoenix, Arizona, to explore innovative educational opportunities, which includes establishment of a "certificate program in entrepreneurship". The partnership, which fits into the city's plan to create a "downtown innovation district", included renovation and expansion of Mesa's downtown campus facility at 225 E. Main Street to include space which would be provided "rent-free" to Co+Hoots as a commercial co-working space. Benedictine leases this downtown facility from the city, a lease which ends in 2038, with an option to purchase beginning in 2033.

== Academics ==
Benedictine University offers 59 undergraduate majors through The College of Science, The College of Liberal Arts, The Daniel L. Goodwin College of Business, and The College of Education and Health Services. It also offers 19 graduate programs, 34 graduate certificates, and 4 doctoral programs.

More than 1,000 students have graduated with a Master of Business Administration (M.B.A.) or Master of Science in Management Information Systems (M.S.M.I.S.) from Benedictine University through its partnerships with two Chinese universities – Shenyang University of Technology (SUT) and Shenyang Jianzu University (SJZU) – formed in the early 2000s. In 2009, Benedictine partnered with two universities in Vietnam—the Vietnam National University (VNU) in Hanoi and Binh Dong University in Ho Chi Minh City (formerly Saigon)—to offer graduate programs in business administration and management information systems. In 2012, Benedictine received approval from the Ministry of Education in China to offer a Master of Public Health (M.P.H.) through a partnership with Dalian Medical University.

U.S. News & World Report listed Benedictine among its best colleges in 2019 (ranked #221 [tie] in National Universities). Forbes magazine named Benedictine among "America’s Top Colleges" for the ninth consecutive year in 2019 (ranked #566 in Top Colleges, #362 in Private Colleges, and #222 in Research Universities). Benedictine did not make the Forbes list in 2020.

== Athletics ==
=== Lisle Eagles ===
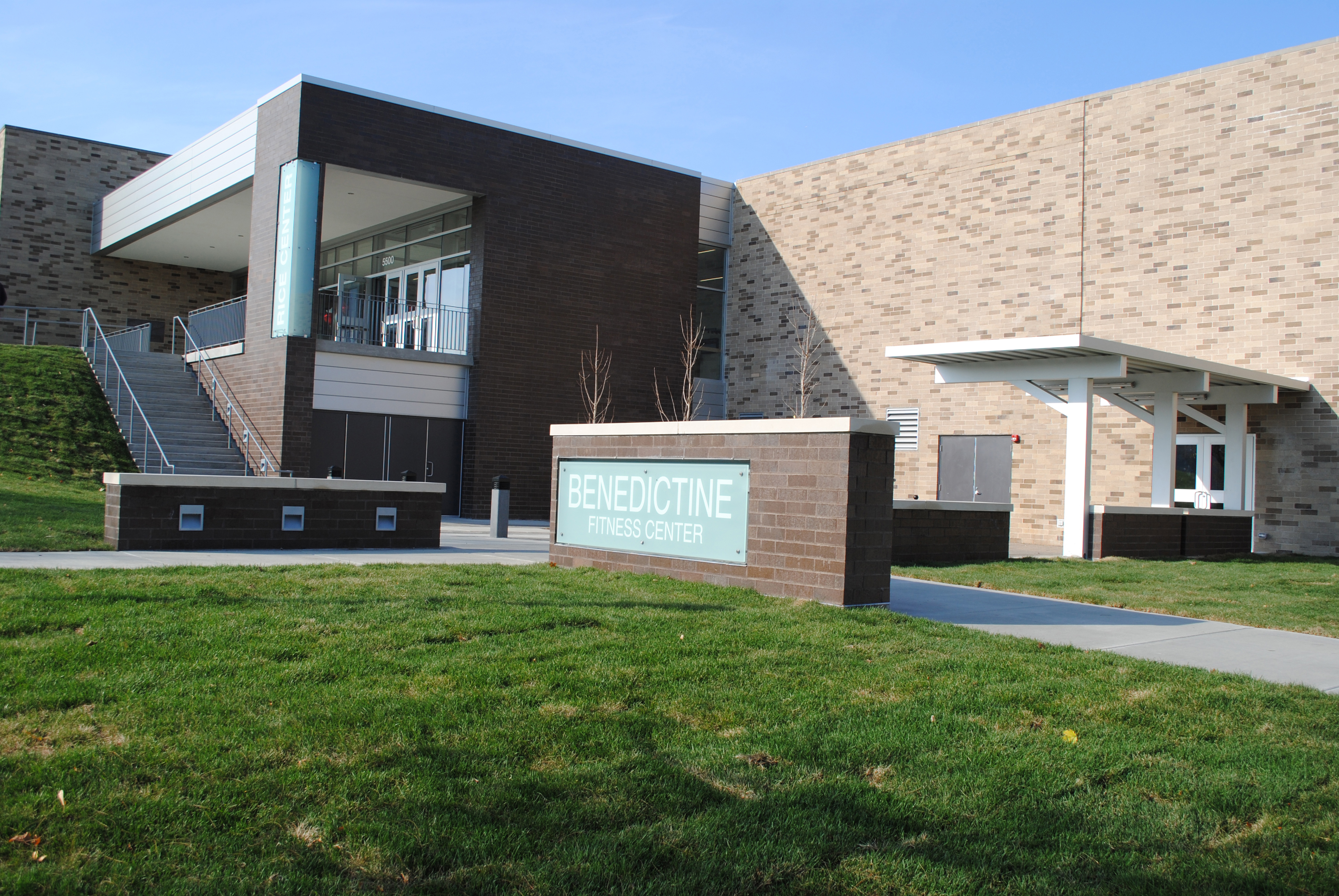
Dan and Ada Rice Center in Lisle

The athletic teams at the Lisle campus are called the Eagles. The campus is a member at the NCAA Division III ranks, primarily competing in the Northern Athletics Collegiate Conference (NACC) since the 2006–07 academic year. The Eagles previously competed in the defunct Northern Illinois-Iowa Conference (NIIC) until after the 2005–06 school year.

Benedictine–Lisle competes in 19 intercollegiate athletic programs: Men's sports include baseball, basketball, cross country, football, golf, lacrosse, soccer, track & field and volleyball, while women's sports include basketball, cross country, golf, lacrosse, soccer, softball, track & field and volleyball.

=== Mesa Redhawks ===
The athletic teams at the Mesa campus are called the Redhawks. The campus is a member of the National Association of Intercollegiate Athletics (NAIA), primarily competing in the Great Southwest Athletic Conference (GSAC) since the 2024–25 academic year.

Benedictines–Mesa competes in 15 intercollegiate athletic programs: men's sports include baseball, basketball, golf, soccer and volleyball, while women's sports include basketball, beach volleyball, golf, soccer, softball and volleyball. Club sports include badminton, bowling, eSports and spirit squad.

The men's and women's golf, cross country, volleyball and tennis teams played their first season at the club level in the 2014–15 school year.

=== Intramurals ===
Both campuses also offer intramurals, group fitness classes and club sports. Benedictine students play men's tennis, men's lacrosse, ping pong, spirit squad, eSports, bowling and badminton as club sports.
