= Sisters of St. Agnes =

Congregation of Sisters of Saint Agnes
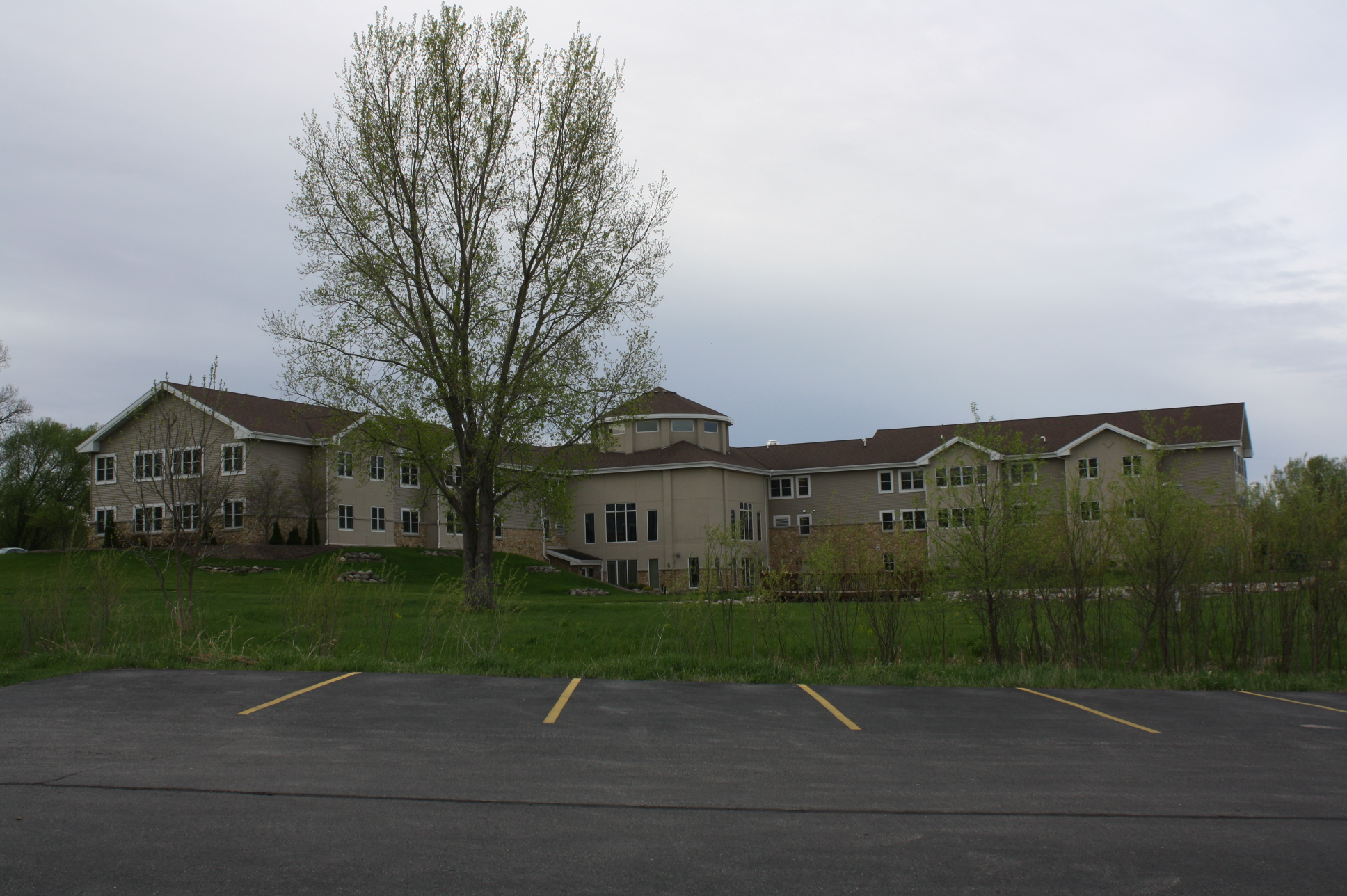
- Motherhouse in Fond du Lac, Wisconsin
- Formation: c. AD 1858; 168 years ago
- Founder: Caspar Rehrl, Francis Haas, Mother Agnes Hazotte
- Type: Catholic religious order
- Headquarters: Fond du Lac, Wisconsin Archdiocese of Milwaukee
- Website: csasisters.org

The Congregation of Sisters of Saint Agnes is a Catholic religious institute for women founded in 1858 and named in honor of Saint Agnes. The Motherhouse is located in Fond du Lac, Wisconsin within the Archdiocese of Milwaukee.

== History ==
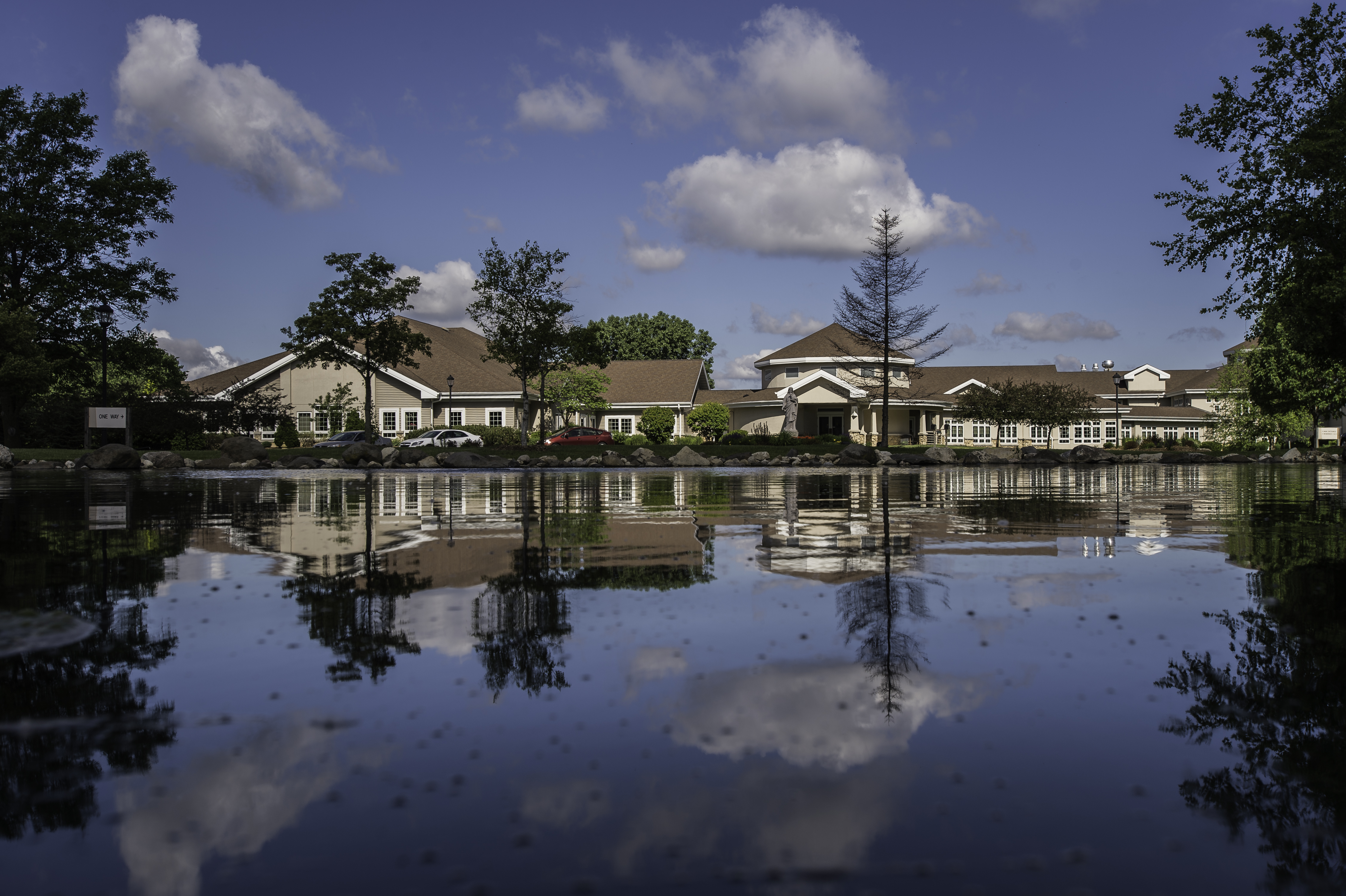
Motherhouse of the Congregation of Sisters of St. Agnes

The Congregation of Sisters of St. Agnes was founded in Barton, Wisconsin, on August 12, 1858. Father Caspar Rehrl (1809 - 1881), an Austrian missionary, established a sisterhood of pioneer women under the patronage of St. Agnes of Rome to whom he had a special devotion. At first the group suffered such untold hardship that, for a few months in 1861, it was reduced to one blind sister.

The arrival of Mary Hazotte in 1863 gave the fledgling community a new life and leadership when she, in 1864 at the age of 17, was elected general superior. Mother Agnes Hazotte (1847 - 1905) directed the move from Barton to Fond du Lac, WI, in 1870. She also authorized the staffing by Sisters of St. Agnes of Leo House for German Catholic immigrants in NYC in 1889. Mother Agnes served as the leader of the Congregation until her death in 1905. In 1870, Father Francis Haas became the spiritual director of the community and assisted in revising the original rule.

In 1893, land was purchased adjoining the convent grounds for the establishment of St. Agnes Hospital, which was dedicated on June 23, 1896.

These three founders paved the ways for growth and expansion. As of 2023, more than 125 vowed members of the Congregation minister throughout the United States and Nicaragua.

== Membership ==
Catholic women who profess the vows of celibate chastity, poverty, and obedience are known as vowed members. Women and men of any religious background who are single, married, or divorced and desire to live out the Congregation's mission without professing the three vows are known as Associates.

== Ministries ==
Vowed members are involved in the work of education, health care, social services, community service, church ministry, retreat ministry, prison ministry, spirituality and wellness, and non-profit service. The Congregation sponsors Marian University in Fond du Lac, Wisconsin.

The Congregation sponsored Agnesian HealthCare in Fond du Lac, Wisconsin, until 2018, when it transferred sponsorship of its medical ministries to SSM Health.

== Recognition ==
In 2023, the congregation was recognized by Catholic Climate Covenant with a "U.S. Laudato Si' Champions Award" in the "Religious Order" category.
