= Society for the Study of Medieval Languages and Literature =

Learned society on the Middle Ages

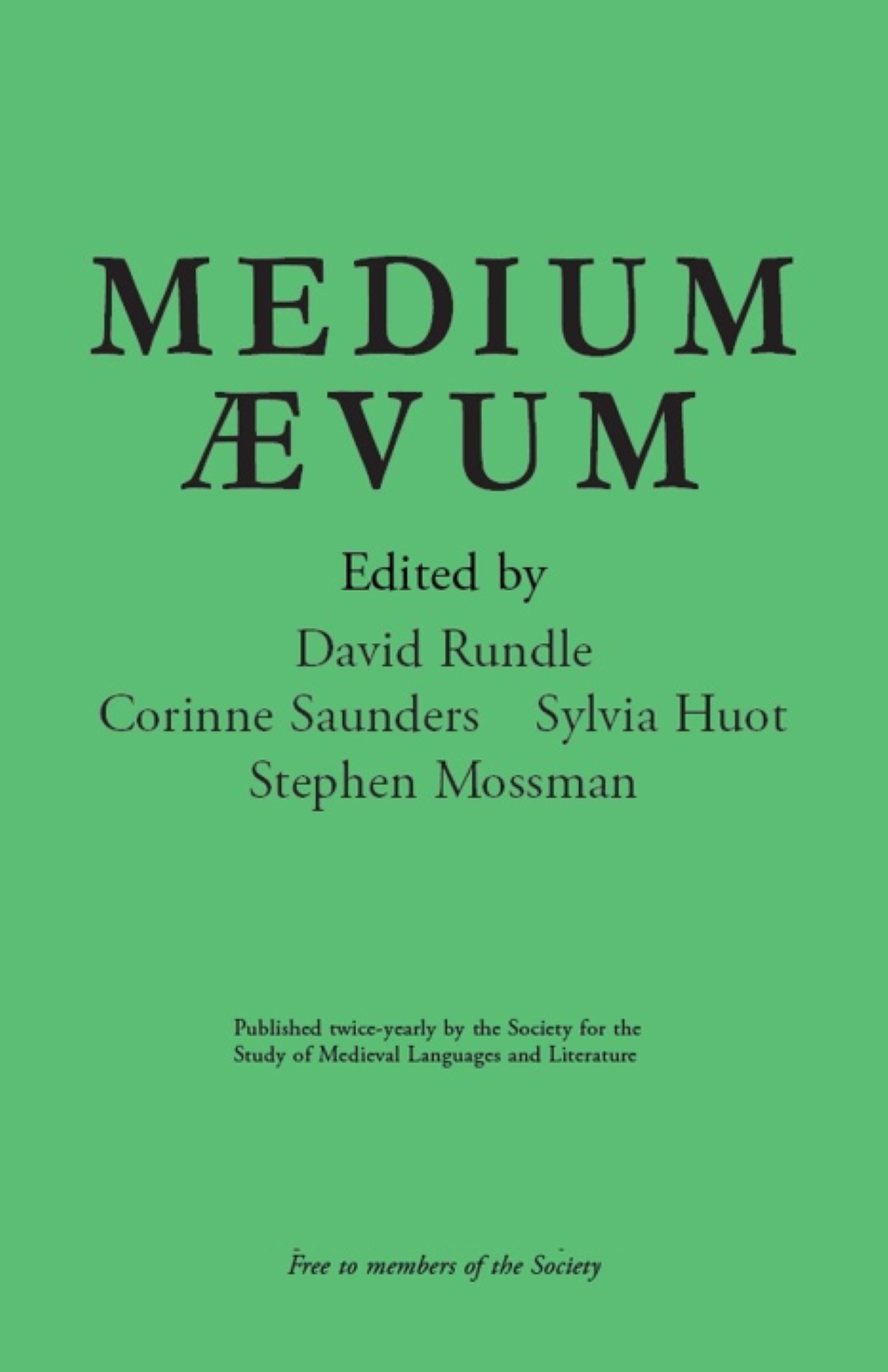
- Abbreviation: SSMLL
- Formation: 15 February 1932
- Type: learned society
- Purpose: The encouragement and dissemination of research on medieval culture
- Headquarters: Oxford, United Kingdom
- Region served: United Kingdom
- President: Alastair Minnis
- Vice-Presidents: John Hines, Julia Walworth
- Journal Editors: Sylvia Huot, Stephen Mossman, David Rundle, Corinne J. Saunders
- Monographs Lead Editor: Anthony Lappin
- Publication: Medium Ævum and Medium Ævum monographs
- Website: https://mediumaevum.org.uk/

The Society for the Study of Medieval Languages and Literature (SSMLL) is a learned society that supports scholarly research and publication on the culture of the Middle Ages. It is best known for publishing the international academic journal Medium Ævum and a related monograph series.

== Overview ==
The society was founded at the Taylor Institution of the University of Oxford on 15 February 1932. It evolved from the Arthurian Society of Oxford, which initiated the journal Arthuriana.

The object of the society is to advance education by the encouragement of research in medieval languages and literature and the dissemination of that research to the scholarly community and the wider public. The primary focus of the society is on its journal, Medium Ævum, which has run continuously since 1932 alongside a series of monographs. Since its foundation, its membership has also sponsored research bursaries, conferences, and an annual Medium Ævum Essay Prize.

The society is a registered charity in the United Kingdom. HMRC recognizes it as an approved professional organization.

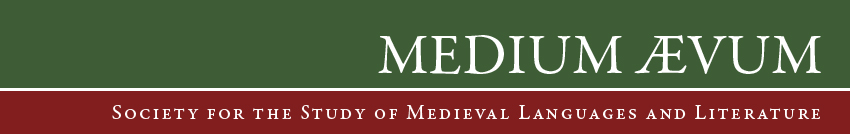
Medium Aevum (SSMLL) logo

== People ==
President: Alastair Minnis

Vice-Presidents: John Hines, Julia Walworth

Editors of the Journal: Sylvia Huot, Stephen Mossman, David Rundle (managing editor), Corinne J. Saunders

Editors of the Monographs: Anthony Lappin (lead editor), Yun Ni, Justin Willson

Executive Committee: The President, the Vice-Presidents, and the Editors, ex officio; Sarah Bowden, Elizabeth Boyle, Rachel Burns, Kenneth Clarke, Andrew Dunning, Julia Smith, Rebecca Thomas, Julia Walworth

Executive Officers: Eleanor Baker, Anna Wilmore, Hannah Ryley

Graduate Observers: Elsina Caponetti, Lucy Turton
