= Edgewood High School of the Sacred Heart =

Private school in Madison, Wisconsin, United States

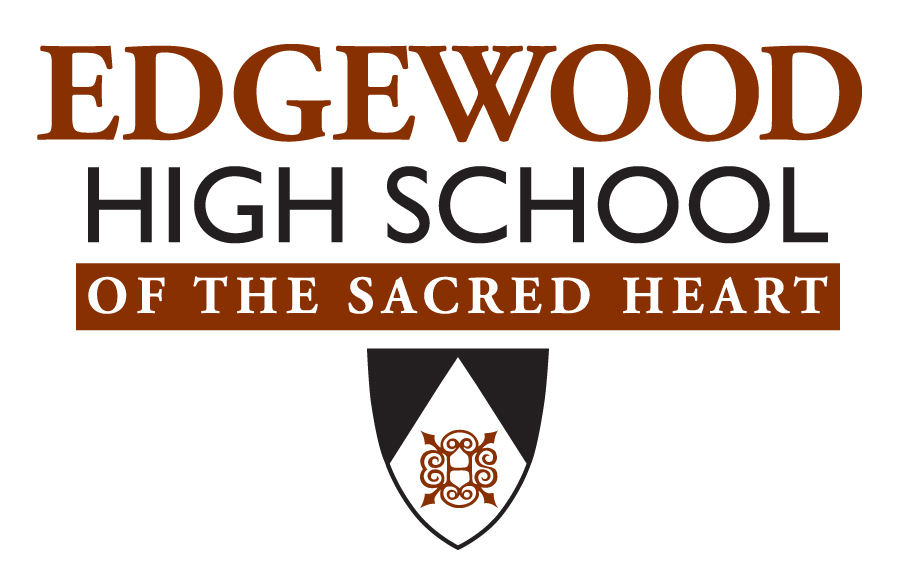

Location
- 2219 Monroe Street; Madison, (Dane County), Wisconsin 53711; United States; 43°3′36″N 89°25′17″W

Information
- Type: Private
- Motto: Veritas/Laudare, Benedicere, Praedicare (Truth/(Dominican): To praise, to bless and to preach)
- Religious affiliation: Roman Catholic
- Established: 1881
- Oversight: Dominican Sisters of Sinsinawa
- CEEB code: 501155
- President: Kevin Rea
- Principal: Jerry Zander
- Teaching staff: 57.0 (on an FTE basis)
- Grades: 9–12
- Gender: Coed
- Enrollment: 488 (2023–24)
- Average class size: 19
- Student to teacher ratio: 8.4
- Classes offered: 132
- Campus size: 57 acres, shared with grade school and college
- Campus type: non-boarding
- Colors: Maroon and gold
- Slogan: A Motivating Educational Experience in a Caring Dominican Catholic Community
- Song: All Hail, All Hail, Crusaders
- Athletics: WIAA, 13 boys and 14 girls teams
- Athletics conference: Badger West, Capitol (Football), Big Badger (Boys and Girls Lacrosse)
- Mascot: Eddie Edgewood
- Team name: Crusaders
- Accreditation: Independent Schools Association of the Central States
- Publication: Inside Edge weekly newsletter; Crusader Connection alumni newsletter; The Wayfarer student literary and arts magazine; Wings of Discovery journal of student scientific research
- Newspaper: The Envoy
- Yearbook: Crusader
- Endowment: Approximately $6 million
- Tuition: $12,660
- Alumni: 10,500+
- Website: https://www.edgewoodhs.org/

Edgewood High School of the Sacred Heart is a private, Catholic, college preparatory school located in Madison, Wisconsin. Edgewood has been sponsored since its inception by the Dominican Sisters of Sinsinawa, Wisconsin. In the 2019–2020 school year, it enrolled 476 students. Also on the Edgewood campus are Edgewood University and Edgewood Campus School, an elementary and middle school.

== History ==
Edgewood was founded in 1871 on Monroe St. in Madison by the Dominican Sisters of Sinsinawa as Saint Regina Academy, a boarding school for girls, and a day school for boys and girls. In 1881, Governor Cadwallader Washburn donated his official residence on Lake Wingra, "Edgewood Villa," after losing a bid for re-election. Saint Regina Academy continued to operate until a fire in 1893 destroyed the original building and a new building under construction. Less than a year after the fire, the school/convent was rebuilt and re-opened as Sacred Heart Academy. In 1927, the current high school's original building was completed according to the design of Philadelphia architect Albert Kelsey, son-in-law of Governor Cadwallader Washburn, under the name Edgewood High School of the Sacred Heart.

An additional wing was completed in 1937 and a second addition with new classrooms, gymnasium, swimming pool and Commons was completed in 1967. In the 1990s the school added another gym (the Krantz Center) and shared in the construction of the Sonderegger Science Center, which is used cooperatively by the three Edgewood schools on the campus.

== Academics ==
The Edgewood curriculum encompasses 132 credit-eligible courses across twelve departments. The school also teaches 12 AP (Advanced Placement) courses, including English, Calculus, 2nd Year Calculus Honors, Biology, Chemistry, Physics, Environmental Science, European History, U.S. History, Spanish, French, and Latin. The school's student literary magazine, musical productions, remote environmental science field course and Latin oratory are all award-winning programs. About 1/3 of juniors and 1/2 of seniors take at least one AP course. Edgewood also has programs for students with minor learning disabilities and challenges, which serve about 1/4 of its students.

Graduation requirements, including four credits of English, and three credits each of Math, Science and Social Studies, help ensure students have a college preparatory background. Edgewood also has Public Speaking as a required course in addition to requirements in Religious Studies, Physical Education, Fine Arts and Computer Literacy, and offers Aviation as a unique elective. More than 95% of Edgewood's graduates go on to college, including having applied to and received acceptance to 85 of the Top 100.

Besides having strong curricular offerings, Edgewood also provides students options for expanding their academic pursuits. A robotics team, math team, Science Olympiad, National Honor Society, environmental club, honor societies for Spanish and Latin students, book club, strategy games club, political/current events club, multicultural club and other groups organize activities, trips and competitive opportunities. Key Club, STAR (Sisters Taking Active Roles), Fellowship of Christian Athletes, Class/Executive Council, Dominican Preaching Team, LINK Crew and Leadership Corps all provide opportunities to learn skills, exercise leadership and engage in personal growth activities.

== Fine arts ==
The annual Fine Arts Festival brings professional guest artists, performers, and musicians to the school, offers a student talent showcase, includes a student/faculty hosted film festival with commentary, and exhibits a juried selection of two- and three-dimensional art.

The Drama Department stages two productions per year, involving more than 100 students in each, either on stage or on technical crews. Since the inception of the Overture Center for the Arts Tommy Awards in 2009–2010, Edgewood High School musicals have earned "Outstanding Musical" honors for Anything Goes (2010), Hairspray (2011), West Side Story (2012), Guys and Dolls (2013) and Mary Poppins (2015).

Extracurriculars include an improv comedy troupe, Laughing Stock, and one-act play competitions. Edgewood participates in the Young Playwrights program as part of a course in which students write their own one-act plays, which are entered into competition against other participating schools.

Students may choose from instrumental ensembles, including concert bands, orchestra, jazz ensembles, chamber music ensembles (woodwinds, brass, percussion, small combos), pep band, pit orchestra and handbells. Group and individual piano classes are also offered. Vocal ensembles include the Edgewood chorus, concert choir, and Crusader Singers show choir. Students may join the Edgetones a cappella group that performs original arrangements.

Visual/studio arts range from photography, drawing, painting and commercial design to jewelry, architecture and ceramics. The school participates in the annual Badger Conference Art Show and the Congressional Art Show.

Edgewood opened a new Performing Arts Center, named for longtime music teacher Dennis McKinley, in August 2019. The Dennis McKinley Performing Arts Center is home to the school's Band, Orchestra, Choir Piano and Theater programs, bringing nearly all of the school's fine arts programs under one roof. The new auditorium built as a part of the expansion seats over 400 and is host to both of the Drama Department's theatrical productions each year, along with concerts, assemblies and other school events.

== Service ==
All Edgewood students complete a minimum of 100 hours of community and school service as a graduation requirement. Volunteerism is perceived by most as enhancing their lives and nearly a third of students graduate having doubled the required number of hours, with some having participated in 500 or more hours of service. Edgewood participates in a school-wide day of service, Edgewood in the Community, during which students, faculty, staff, parents and alumni join to provide more than 3,500 volunteer hours at more than 40 different locations annually in a single day. Service is also incorporated into the school's program of grade-level retreats.

== Athletics ==
Previously a member of the now-defunct Wisconsin Catholic Interscholastic Athletic Association (WCIAA) and Wisconsin Independent Schools Athletic Association (WISAA), Edgewood athletics moved to the Wisconsin Interscholastic Athletic Association (WIAA) and the Badger Conference in 1999.

While members of the WCIAA the Crusaders won 10 state championships across 3 different sports. Additionally the Crusaders won 15 WISAA state championships across 4 different sports.

As of January 2015, the Crusaders have since amassed nearly 100 conference championships, 25 state championships in ten different sports, additional individual state championships, and been state runner-up 30 times in 12 different sports. In 2013, Crusader girls' teams took the team state title in three fall sports — golf, cross country and tennis — and also had the diving champion and runner-up. Their wins were followed by the boys' swimming team taking the 2014 title.

The girls' cross country team took the Division 2 sectional and state titles in 2013. The boys' baseball team won the state championship in 2004 and in 2009. The boys' basketball team won the state title in 2002 and won back-to-back Badger Conference titles in 2003 and 2004. In 2009, the Crusaders tied with Monroe for the Badger South Conference championship.

The girls' basketball team won the Badger South Championship in the 2005-2006 and 2008–2009 seasons, tying with Monroe both times. In 2015 the team advanced to the Sectional Semi-finals and in 2016 they advanced to the State semi-finals, falling to eventual State Champions Hayward High School, 50–49.

The boys' golf team won the 2009 and 2010 WIAA Division 2 state championships.

The girls' golf team has won the state title 14 times in 15 years, nine times consecutively (2001–2009). They lost by one stroke in 2010 but took every title from 2011 to 2015. It is the longest consecutive championship streak for any girls' sport in state history.

The boys' hockey team advanced to the state title game in 2008, finishing as runner-up to Eau Claire Memorial High School. The alpine ski racing team (for both boys and girls) has had individual competitors place in the top four in conference standings.

The Ultimate Frisbee team advanced to the state title game in 2016, finishing as runner-up to Madison West High School.

The girls' basketball team won the Division 3 state title in 2017, defeating Greendale Martin Luther 51–30.

The boys' golf team won 6 consecutive Division 2 State Championships, from 2017 to 2023 (No competition 2020).

== Notable alumni ==
- Chris Farley, Class of 1982; actor and comedian
- Peter Kraus, television personality
- Sophia Minnaert, sportscaster
- Georgia O'Keeffe, artist
- Jeffrey Straubel, Class of 1994; co-founder and former chief technical officer for Tesla Motors, Inc.
- John F. Tefft, Class of 1967; U.S. Ambassador to Lithuania (2000–2003), Georgia (2005–2009), Ukraine (2009–2013), Russia (2014–2017)

== Notable faculty ==
- Sister Albertus Magnus McGrath (1911 – 1978), author, advocate for women, Dominican University (Illinois) faculty and history department chair
