= New Chaucer Society =

Learned society dedicated to the study of Geoffrey Chaucer and the Middle Ages

The New Chaucer Society
- Abbreviation: NCS
- Named after: Geoffrey Chaucer
- Predecessor: Chaucer Society (1868–1912) 2
- Formation: 1979
- Type: Professional academic organization
- Legal status: Active
- Purpose: Study of Geoffrey Chaucer and the Middle Ages
- Origins: United States
- Region served: International
- Methods: Conferences, publications
- Fields: Medieval literature, Geoffrey Chaucer
- Members: Yes (high school teachers, college and university professors, graduate students)
- Official language: English
- Publication: Studies in the Age of Chaucer New Chaucer Studies: Pedagogy & Profession

The New Chaucer Society is a professional academic organization dedicated to the study of Geoffrey Chaucer and the Middle Ages, founded in 1977. It is based at the Agnes Scott College in Decatur, Georgia. The society's institutional home rotates based on the Executive Director's home university.

== History ==
The predecessor of the New Chaucer Society, the Chaucer Society, was founded by Frederick James Furnivall in 1870 and closed in 1912.

The New Chaucer Society was incorporated in 1977 by Paul Ruggiers, a David Ross Boyd and George Lynn Cross Research Professor of English, at the University of Oklahoma and launched its first membership drive in 1978 when 6,000 invitations were sent to scholars across the United States and 2,000 were sent to medievalists in the United Kingdom, Europe, and Japan. It sought to reconstitute the original Chaucer Society founded by Frederick Furnivall in the United Kingdom in 1870, which became defunct during World War I.

The New Chaucer Society was established as a venue for international exchange through an annual yearbook, newsletter, and congress. The first edition of Studies in the Age of Chaucer was published in April 1979 under the editorship of Roy Pearcy; the first congress was held in Washington, D.C. that same month. The Society was originally headquartered at the University of Oklahoma as it was an outgrowth of the Variorum Chaucer project led by Ruggiers, but moved to the University of Tennessee in Knoxville in 1983 when John Hurt Fisher became executive director. Subsequently, the Society's headquarters was tied to the institution of the executive director. Its first international congress was held in York, UK in 1984.

== Publications and Outputs ==
The society publishes an annual journal, Studies in the Age of Chaucer.

The society also organizes a biennial international congress and supports the Chaucer Bibliography Online.

The society endorses New Chaucer Studies: Pedagogy & Profession.

== Past presidents ==
The following persons are or have been president of the society:

- 1978–1980: E. Talbot Donaldson
- 1980–1982: Charles Muscatine
- 1982–1983: John H. Fisher
- 1983–1984: Derek Brewer
- 1984–1986: Beryl Rowland
- 1986–1988: Robert W. Frank, Jr.
- 1988–1990: Derek Pearsall
- 1990–1992: Alfred David
- 1992–1994: Jill Mann
- 1994–1996: V.A. Kolve
- 1996–1998: Mary Carruthers
- 1998–2000: Paul Strohm
- 2000–2002: Helen Cooper
- 2002–2004: Winthrop Wetherbee
- 2004–2006: David Wallace
- 2006–2008: John Ganim
- 2008–2010: Richard Firth Green
- 2010–2012: Carolyn Dinshaw
- 2012–2014: Alastair Minnis
- 2014–2016: Susan Crane
- 2016–2018: Ardis Butterfield
- 2018–2020: Ruth Evans
- 2020–2022: Anthony Bale
- 2022–2024: Stephanie Trigg
- 2024–2026: Candace Barrington
- 2026–2028: Kellie Robertson
