= Carolyn Dinshaw =

American academic and author

Carolyn Dinshaw is an American academic and author, who has specialised in issues of gender and sexuality in the medieval context.

== Education and career ==
Dinshaw was born to an Indian father, Dudley Dinshaw, a Parsi from Lucknow, and an American mother.

Dinshaw earned her bachelor's degree in 1978 from Bryn Mawr College and went on to graduate study at Princeton University where she earned her PhD in English Literature in 1982 with a dissertation that later became the book Chaucer and the Text.

She is currently a Professor of Social and Cultural Analysis and English at New York University working in medieval studies and queer theory. The corpus of her work focuses on the relationship between the present and the medieval past, and in particular the ways that certain aspects of the medieval past continue to resonate in contemporary issues of gender and sexuality, the embodied experience of time, and "ecological thought."

She is the recipient of the 2017–2018 James Robert Brudner Memorial Prize at Yale University.

== Affiliations ==
In addition to being a prolific scholar on a variety of topics in queer theory, medieval studies, and ecocriticism, Dishaw is one of the founding Co-Editors of GLQ: A Journal of Lesbian and Gay Studies, was on the advisory board for Exemplaria (2008–13) and currently sits on the editorial board of postmedieval. She has also been the president of the New Chaucer Society (2010–12), on the Committee for Lesbian and Gay History in the American Historical Association. Dinshaw is also affiliated with the Society for Medieval Feminist Scholarship, the Society for the Study of Homosexuality in the Middle Ages; the John Gower Society, Lollard Society, the Medieval Academy of America and the Modern Language Association of America.

== Select bibliography ==
=== Monographs ===
- Chaucer and the Text: Two Views of the Author, Garland Press, 1988.
- Chaucer's Sexual Poetics, Madison: University of Wisconsin Press, 1989.
- Getting Medieval: Sexualities and Communities, Pre- and Postmodern, Durham NC: Duke University Press, 1999.
- How Soon Is Now? Medieval Texts, Amateur Readers and the Queerness of Time, Durham NC: Duke University Press, 2012.
- Exploring Nowhere: Mirages, Digital Maps, and the Historical Problem of Location, in progress

=== Articles and book chapters ===
- "Margery Kempe" In (pp. 222–39) Dinshaw, Carolyn and Wallace, David (eds), The Cambridge Companion to Medieval Women's Writing, Cambridge, England: Cambridge UP, 2003. v–xix, 289 pp. (Cambridge Companions to Literature). (2003)
- "The History of GLQ, Volume 1: LGBTQ Studies, Censorship, and Other Transnational Problems" GLQ: A Journal of Lesbian and Gay Studies, (12:1), 2006, 5–26. (2006)
- "Medieval Feminist Criticism" In (pp. 11–26) Plain, Gill (ed. and introd.), Sellers, Susan (ed. and introd.), Gubar, Susan (postscript), A History of Feminist Literary Criticism, Cambridge, England: Cambridge UP, 2007. xi, 352 pp.. (2007)
- "Temporalities" In (pp. 107–123) Strohm, Paul (ed. and introd.), Middle English, Oxford, England: Oxford UP, 2007. xii, 521 pp.(Oxford Twenty-First Century Approaches to Literature). (2007)
