= Library and Information Science Access Midwest Program =

Library science academic networking program

LIS Access Midwest Program (LAMP)
- Abbreviation: LAMP
- Legal status: Active
- Purpose: "LAMP seeks to employ a range of recruitment techniques including summer institutes and internships, peer and professional mentorship and guidance, and financial assistance for the completion of a Master's degree in LIS."
- Headquarters: Champaign, Illinois
- Key people: Amani Ayad (program coordinator)
- Website: LIS Access Midwest Program

Library and Information Science Access Midwest Program (LAMP) is an Institute of Museum and Library Services funded regional network of academic libraries and information science schools working on promoting careers in library and information science. The program looks for promising undergraduate students at its member institutions to participate in activities and events designed to increase their awareness of the profession. The program then provides financial and mentoring support for their graduate studies at one of the member schools. LAMP specifically seeks to encourage the participation of students from statistically and historically underrepresented populations in LIS.

== Participating Institutions ==
=== Illinois ===
- Dominican University
- University of Chicago
- University of Illinois at Urbana-Champaign

=== Ohio ===
- Ohio University-Alden Library

=== Michigan ===
- Michigan State University
- Wayne State University

=== Wisconsin ===
- Marquette University
- University of Wisconsin–Madison
- University of Wisconsin–Milwaukee

=== Other LAMP collaborators ===
- Kent State University
- University of Michigan
