= Louise D'Arcens =

Australian medievalist

Louise D'Arcens is an Australian medievalist. Her research focusses on medievalism and late medieval women's writing. She is a professor in the Department of English at Macquarie University.

== Education ==
D'Arcens gained her BA (1990) and PhD (1997), focusing on authority in medieval women's writing, from the University of Sydney.

== Career ==
In interview, Helen Young observed that D'Arcens' research had moved from 'traditional medieval studies' during her PhD to focus on medievalism.

Between 2008 - 2022, D'Arcens was a chief investigator on the ARC Discovery Grant for the project 'Medievalism in Australian Cultural Memory', along with Stephanie Trigg (University of Melbourne), Andrew Lynch (University of Western Australia), and John Ganim (University of California, Riverside).

She was an associate investigator at the Australian Research Council (ARC) Centre of Excellence for the History of Emotions (2012 - 2016).

Until 2016, D'Arcens was an associate professor at the University of Wollagong.

Between 2013 - 2017, D'Arcens held an Australian Research Council Future Fellowship (2013 - 2017) and in 2021 was elected Fellow of the Australian Academy of the Humanities.

D’Arcens’ current research is on the Middle Ages in modern global culture, comic representations of the medieval past, trans-historical emotion, and how ideas about the medieval past have figured in modern political cultures, especially extremist politics.

== Expertise ==
D'Arcens has worked extensively on popular and political medievalism for academic and general audiences. She has published on a range of others topics such as women's life writing and Christine de Pizan.

== Publications ==
D'Arcens has written three monographs to date:

- World Medievalism (Oxford University Press, 2021).
- Comic medievalism (Boydell & Brewer, 2014).
- Old songs in the timeless land (UWA Publishing, 2011).

Jenna Mead described Comic Medievalism as a significant contribution 'to a new field of inquiry', praising her 'agile forays in (diachronic) literary history and (synchronic) close reading.' World Medievalism was also well received, with positive reviews in the journals Studies in the Age of Chaucer and Comitatus.

D'Arcens edited The Cambridge Companion to Medievalism (Cambridge University Press, 2016) as well as co-editing a number of other collections, which include:

- Maistresse of My Wit: Medieval Women, Modern Scholars (Brepols, 2004) with Juanita Feros Ruys
- International Medievalism and Popular Culture (Cambria, 2014) with Andrew Lynch
- Medieval Literary Voices (Manchester University Press, 2022) with Sif Ríkharðsdóttir

She has also published articles in and edited Special Issues in journals such as Representations and postmedieval.
