= Sylvia Huot =

British scholar of medieval literature

Sylvia Huot is a professor of Medieval French Literature at the University of Cambridge and fellow of Pembroke College. She is the author of several internationally renowned books on Medieval French Literature and the leading expert on the manuscripts of Roman de la Rose, having published extensively on its iconography.

Huot's book Madness in Medieval French Literature (Oxford University Press, 2003) was awarded the 2004 R. H. Gapper Book Prize by the UK Society for French Studies. This prize recognises the work as the best book published by a scholar working in Britain or Ireland in French studies in 2003.

== Published work ==
Authored Books

- Dreams of lovers and lies of poets : poetry, knowledge, and desire in the Roman de la Rose (Legenda, 2010)
- Postcolonial Fictions in the Roman de Perceforest (D.S. Brewer, 2007)
- Madness in Medieval French Literature (Oxford University Press, 2003)
- Allegorical Play in the Old French Motet (Stanford University Press, 1997)
- The Romance of the Rose and its Medieval Readers (Cambridge University Press, 1993)
- From Song to Book (Cornell University Press, 1987)

Edited Books

- Rethinking the Romance of the Rose (University of Pennsylviania Press, 1992)

Articles

- Huot, Sylvia: 'Re-fashioning Boethius: Prose and Poetry in Chartier's Livre de l'esperance'

Medium Ævum, (76:2), 2007, 268–84.

- Huot, Sylvia: "Reading the Lies of Poets: The Literal and the Allegorical in Machaut's Fonteinne amoureuse" Philological Quarterly, (85:1–2), 2006 Winter-Spring, 25–48.
- Huot, Sylvia: "A Tale Much Told: The Status of the Love Philtre in the Old French Tristan Texts"

Zeitschrift für Deutsche Philologie, (124:[Supplement]), 2005, 82–95

- Huot, Sylvia: "Cultural Conflict as Anamorphosis: Conceptual Spaces and Visual Fields in the Roman de Perceforest" Romance Studies, (22:3), 2004 Nov, 185–95.
- Huot, Sylvia: "Dangerous Embodiments: Froissart's Harton and Jean d'Arras's Melusine"

Speculum: A Journal of Medieval Studies, (78:2), 2003 Apr, 400–20.

- Huot, Sylvia: "Reading across Genres: Froissart's Joli buisson de jonece and Machaut's Motets"

French Studies: A Quarterly Review, (57:1), 2003 Jan, 1–10.

- Huot, Sylvia: "Guillaume de Machaut and the Consolation of Poetry" Modern Philology: A Journal Devoted to Research in Medieval and Modern Literature, (100:2), 2002 Nov, 169–95.
- Huot, Sylvia: "Unruly Bodies, Unspeakable Acts: Pierre de Béarn, Camel de Camois, and Actaeon in the Writings of Jean Froissart" Exemplaria: A Journal of Theory in Medieval and Renaissance Studies, (14:1), 2002 Spring, 79–98.
- Huot, Sylvia: "Unspeakable Horror, Ineffable Bliss: Riddles and Marvels in the Prose Tristan"

Medium Ævum, (71:1), 2002, 47–65.

- Huot, Sylvia, 'Bodily peril: Sexuality and the subversion of order in Jean de Meun's Roman de la Rose', Modern Language Review, 95, 2000, p. 41–61.
- Huot, Sylvia: "Popular Piety and Devotional Literature: A Old French Rhyme about the Passion and Its Textual History" Romania: Revue Consacrée à l'Etude des Langues et des Litératures Romanes, (115:3–4 [459–460]), 1997, 451–94.
- Huot, Sylvia: "Patience in Adversity: The Courtly Lover and Job in Machaut's Motets 2 and 3"

Medium Aevum, (63:2), 1994, 222–38.

- Huot, Sylvia: "Inventional Mnemonics, Reading and Prayer: A Reply to Mary Carruthers"

Connotations: A Journal for Critical Debate, (3:2), 1993–1994, 103–09 (Replies to 1992-3-2791.).

- Huot, Sylvia: "The Daisy and the Laurel: Myths of Desire and Creativity in the Poetry of Jean Froissart" Yale French Studies, 1991, 240–51.
- Huot, Sylvia: "Polyphonic Poetry: The Old French Motet and Its Literary Context"

French Forum, (14:3), 1989 Sept., 261–278.

- Huot, Sylvia: "'Ci parle l'aucteur': The Rubrication of Voice and Authorship in Roman de la Rose Manuscripts" SubStance: A Review of Theory and Literary Criticism, (17:2 [56]), 1988, 42–48.
- Huot, Sylvia: "Notice sur les fragments poétiques dans un manuscrit du Roman de la Rose"

Romania: Revue Consacree a l'Etude des Langues et des Literatures Romanes, (109:1), 1988, 119–121.

- Huot, Sylvia: "The Medusa Interpolation in the Romance of the Rose: Mythographic Program and Ovidian Intertext" Speculum: A Journal of Medieval Studies, (62:4), 1987 Oct, 865–77.
- Huot, Sylvia: "The Scribe as Editor: Rubrication as Critical Apparatus in Two Manuscripts of the Roman de la Rose" L'Esprit Createur, (27:1), 1987 Spring, 67–78.
- Huot, Sylvia: "Transformations of Lyric Voice in the Songs, Motets, and Plays of Adam de la Halle" Romanic Review, (78:2), 1987 Mar., 148–164.
- Huot, Sylvia: "Poetic Ambiguity and Reader Response in Boccaccio's Amorosa Visione"

Modern Philology: A Journal Devoted to Research in Medieval and Modern Literature, (83:2), 1985 Nov, 109–22.

- Huot, Sylvia: "Seduction and Sublimation: Christine de Pizan, Jean de Meun, and Dante"

Romance Notes, (25:3), 1985 Spring, 361–373.

- Huot, Sylvia: "The Political Implications of Poetic Discourse in The Song of the Albigensian Crusade" French Forum, (9:2), 1984 May, 133–144.
