= Seeta Chaganti =

American medievalist

Academic background
- Education: Harvard University (A.B.); Georgetown University (MA); Yale University (PhD).

Academic work
- Discipline: English studies
- Sub-discipline: Medieval poetry
- Institutions: University of California, Davis

Seeta Chaganti is a medievalist and professor of English at the University of California, Davis. Her research focuses on Old and Middle English poetry and contemporary material culture.

== Education ==
Chaganti completed her A.B. at Harvard University in 1989, followed by an M.A. at Georgetown University in 1995. Her MA dissertation was entitled Crossing the boundaries of substance and accident: rhetoric, ecclesiastical hypocrisy, and eucharistic language in The Pardoner's Tale. She then completed a PhD at Yale University in 2001, with a thesis entitled Memorial and metamorphosis: the image of the reliquary in the poetry of medieval England and France.

== Career ==
After completing her PhD, Chaganti joined the English department at UC Davis, where she continues to work. Her first book, entitled The Medieval Poetics of the Reliquary: Enshrinement, Inscription, Performance, The New Middle Ages, was published in 2008 and built upon her PhD thesis; it is a study on the relationship between reliquaries and poetic form.

In 2018, Chaganti published her second monograph on dance and medieval poetics. This won the Modern Language Association's 2018 Aldo and Jeanne Scaglione Prize for Comparative Literary Studies.

Chaganti was appointed a Trustee of the New Chaucer Society for the period 2018–2022. She has also been elected as a Councillor of the Medieval Academy of America for 2020–23. In 2019, she served as a member of Medievalists of Color's steering committee, and as of 2021 is an Executive Board Member of RaceB4Race. She also served as an interim director for the Davis Humanities Institute in 2013.

Over the course of her academic career, Chaganti has been awarded various fellowships and awards. These include an Academic Senate Distinguished Teaching Award from UC Davis in 2014, and an Outstanding Mentor Award from UC Davis' Consortium for Women and Research in 2012. She was awarded a Davis Humanities Institute Faculty Research Fellowship in 2015, and a Society for the Humanities Fellowship at Cornell University in 2009.

Chaganti's current research interests include a project on early English law's role in violence in the American South, and a collaboration with Gabrielle Nevitt on poetic form and animal studies.

== Selected bibliography ==
=== Monographs ===
- (2008) The Medieval Poetics of the Reliquary: Enshrinement, Inscription, Performance, The New Middle Ages. New York: Palgrave Macmillan. ISBN 978-0-230-60466-7.
- (2018) Strange Footing: Poetic Form and Dance in the Late Middle Ages. Chicago: University of Chicago Press. ISBN 978-0-226-54799-2.

=== Edited volumes ===
- (2012) Medieval poetics and social practice: responding to the work of Penn R. Szittya. New York: Fordham University Press. ISBN 978-0-823-24324-2
