= Politics and Prose =

Independent bookstore in Chevy Chase, Washington, D.C.

Coordinates: 38.955452°N 77.069669°W

- Type: Independent bookstore
- Industry: Bookselling
- Founded: 1984; 42 years ago
- Founder: Carla Cohen; Barbara Meade
- Area served: Washington, D.C., U.S.
- Owner: Bradley Graham; Lissa Muscatine
- Website: politics-prose.com

Politics and Prose (sometimes stylized as Politics & Prose or abbreviated as P&P) is an independent bookstore with its flagship location in Chevy Chase, Washington, D.C., on Connecticut Avenue. The company has two other locations in the DC area, one in Union Market near the NoMa–Gallaudet U station, and the other location is at The Wharf on the Southwest Waterfront.

The original store was founded in 1984 by co-owners Carla Cohen and Barbara Meade, who expanded the store fivefold to its current size. After a failed sale attempt in 2005, the two co-owners eventually sold the store to current owners Bradley Graham and Lissa Muscatine in 2011. Politics and Prose is known for its knowledgeable staff and is seen as a part of DC culture. Its author events attract a number of famous speakers, such as Bill Clinton and J.K. Rowling, and have a reputation for their astute audiences.

== History ==
=== Founding and growth ===
Carla Cohen, after losing her job with the Carter administration, decided to create an independent bookstore in Washington, D.C., despite having no previous experience with running a business. She partnered with Barbara Meade, whom she found through the classifieds, and who, with her previous experience of managing a bookstore, became a co-owner early on. Cohen decided to name the store Politics and Prose because it was "Washington-sounding" and not pretentious, and the two co-owners founded the store in 1984. Meade worried that the name was a put-off, and the store struggled at first to attract authors to speak at its events and relied on local journalists to publicize the location. The store's original location in the Forest Hills neighborhood was across the street from its current spot, and in 1989, Politics and Prose moved to their present larger location after finding success. The store merged with a nearby children's bookstore, the Cheshire Cat, and incorporated its staff in 1990.

=== Failed sale attempt ===
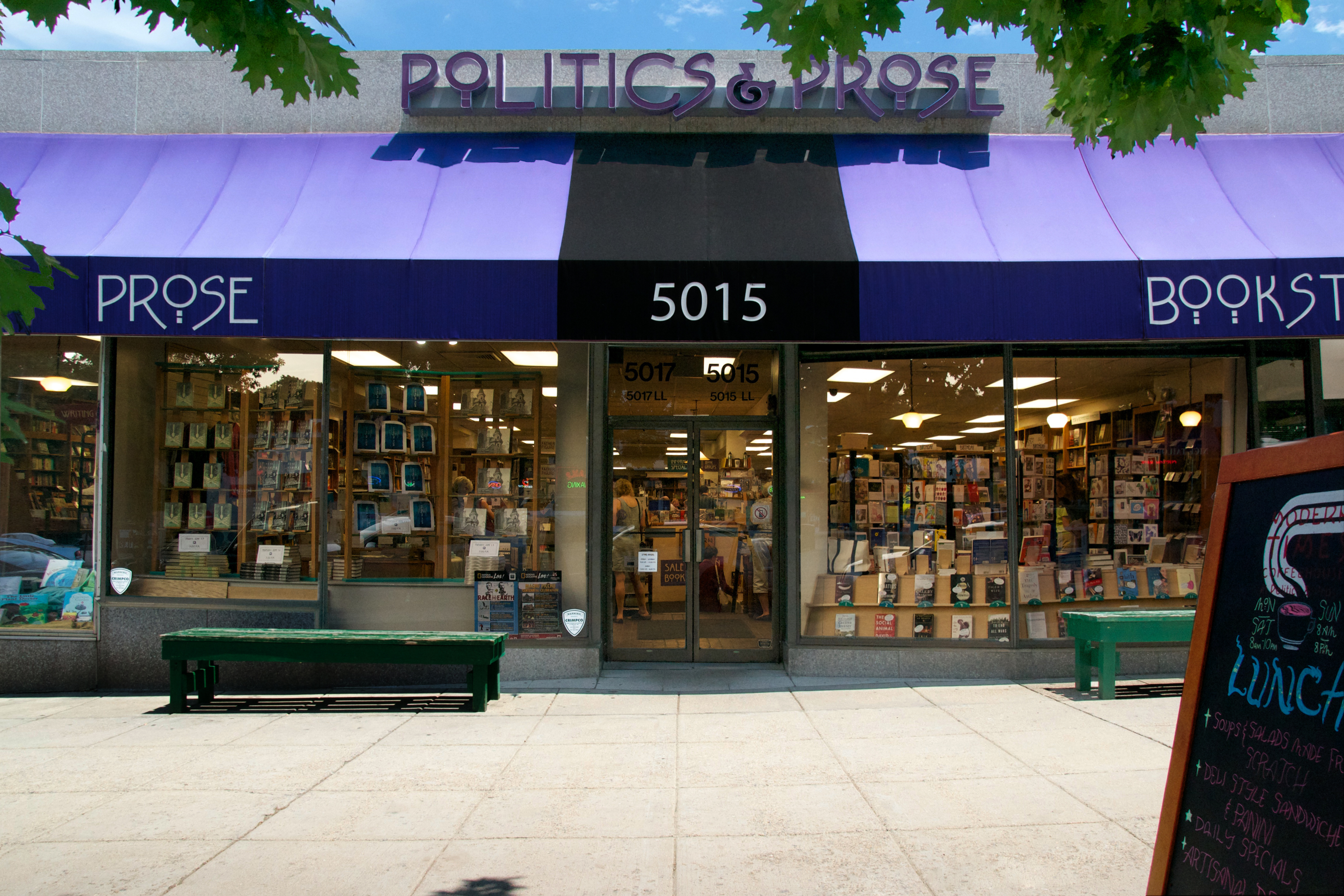
A storefront view of Politics and Prose during the daytime

Business continued to be successful during the late 1990s as other independent bookstores fell by the wayside and companies such as Barnes & Noble expanded. Cohen and Meade decided to sell the store to Danny Gainsburg, who was selling his T-shirt business so he would be able to afford the cost of the store. The co-owners made an agreement with Gainsburg that he would gain control of the store if he could function amicably with the rest of the staff. Cohen and Meade set him up in a part-time position to see how he would interact with the employees and sold him an equity stake in the business without informing the other staff members. Gainsburg was pressured to leave by the staff after he kissed an employee on her birthday. The three co-owners agreed that Gainsburg should resign, and Gainsburg received his initial investment plus a premium. Gainsburg said to The Wall Street Journal, "We all started with good motives, but there was lots of naiveté on all sides." In 2006, a year after the botched sale attempt, Cohen and Meade both decided to hold onto the store as sole co-owners for at least three to five more years and met with an outside consultant to devise an eventual exit strategy.

=== New ownership ===
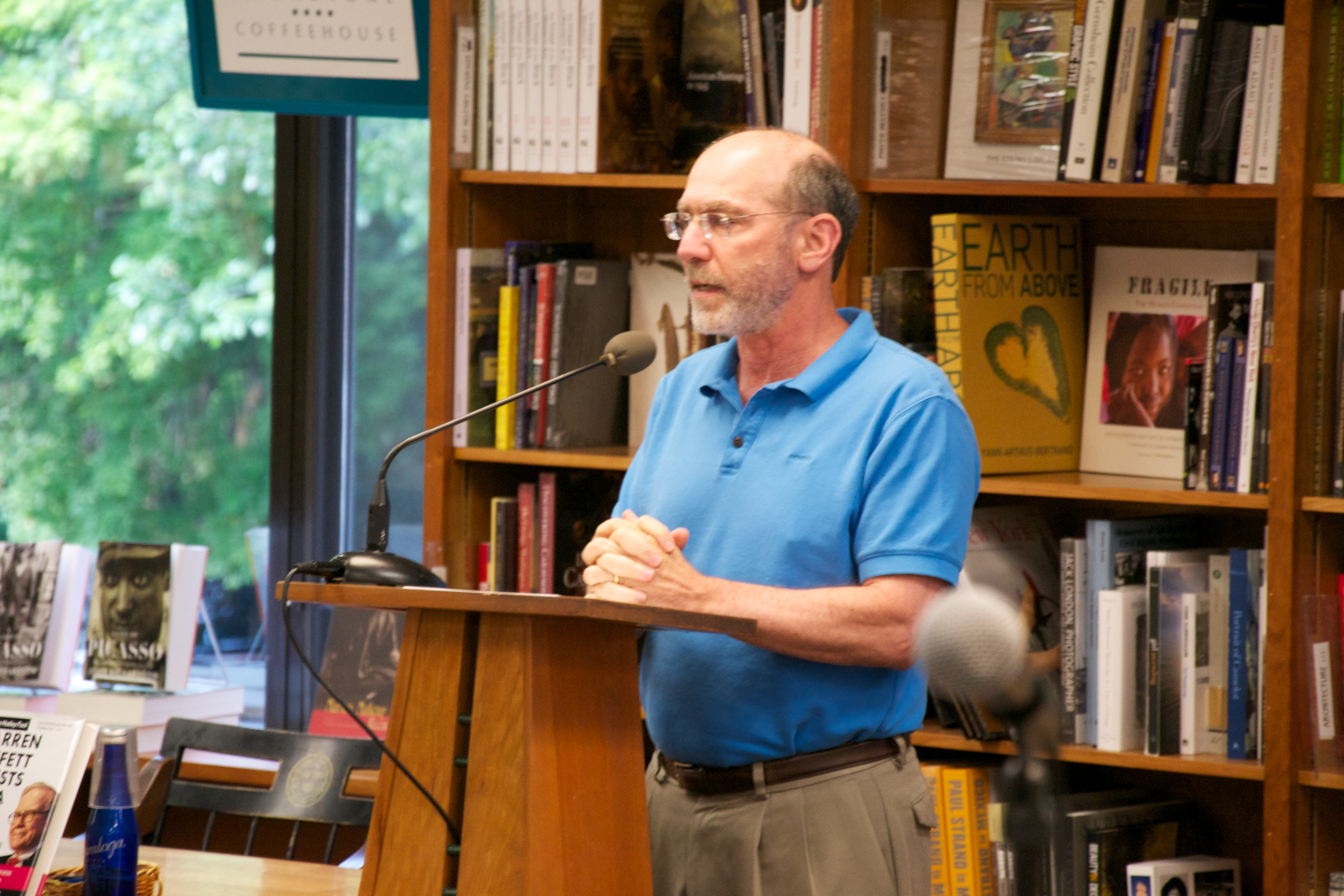
Co-owner Bradley Graham introduces an author event.

In June 2010, Cohen and Meade announced their intention to sell the store. Cohen became seriously ill around this time, and it contributed to the timing of their decision to sell. Journalist Jim Lehrer wrote of the impending sale, "...putting Politics and Prose up for sale is like putting the Washington Monument up for sale." There was considerable speculation in the media about possible buyers for the store. There were reportedly over 50 inquiries by October into the possible purchase of the store from Meade and Cohen's husband, David, who inherited her stake in the store after her death from cancer.

It was announced on March 28, 2011, that two former employees of The Washington Post, Lissa Muscatine and her husband, Bradley Graham, had purchased the store from Meade and David Cohen. The store was reportedly sold for $2 million, although price was not the main factor in the selection of new owners. Meade fully retired from work in the store on December 31, 2012. Graham and Muscatine have added literary classes and trips since purchasing the store.

=== Expansion ===
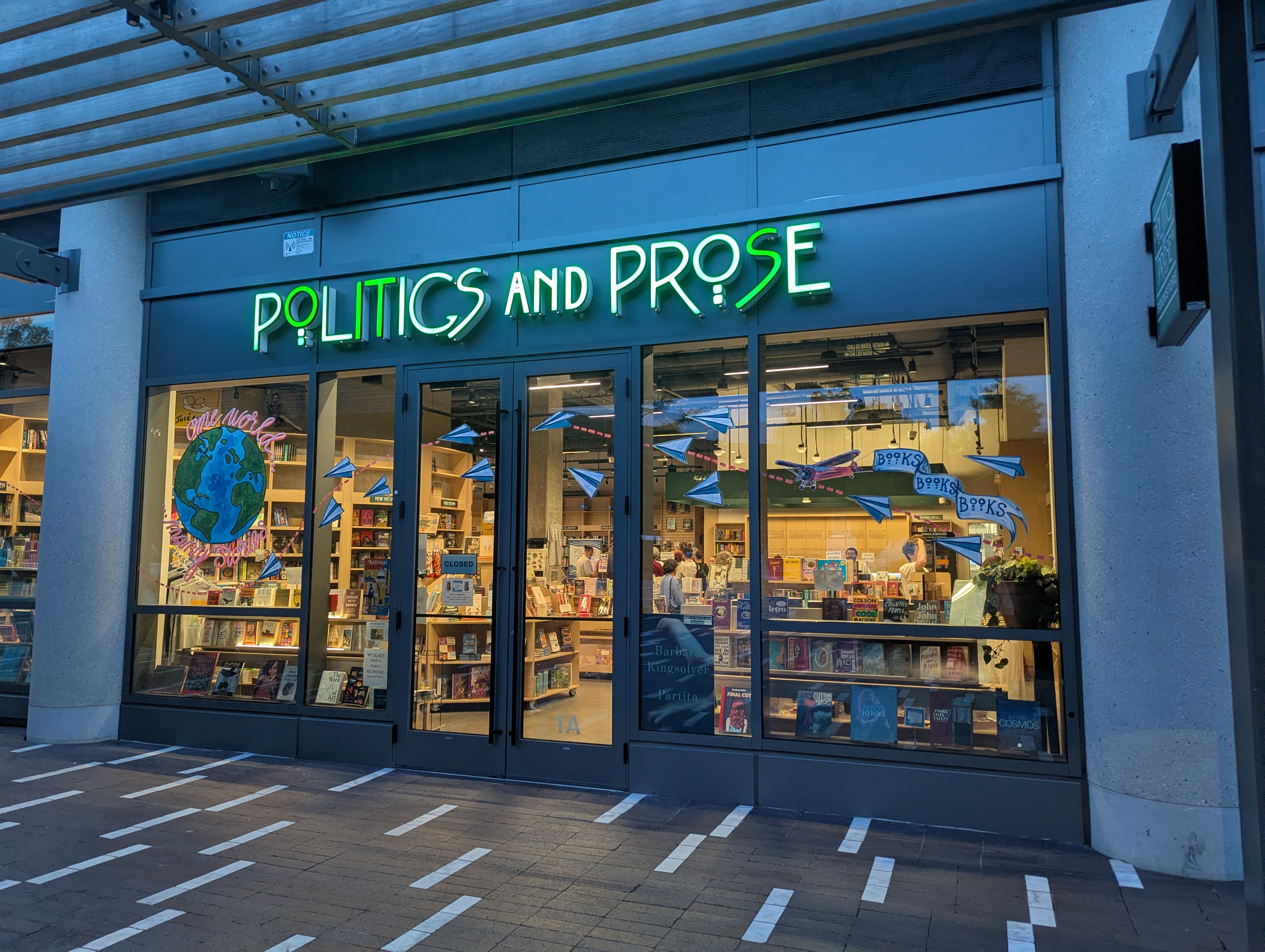
Politics and Prose at the Wharf

The new co-owners, Graham and Muscatine, began to look at opening branch locations soon after purchasing the store. They considered an expansion of Politics & Prose into a Georgetown location but decided against it. In 2014, Politics and Prose announced that it would be operating satellite stores inside Busboys and Poets stores throughout the city called "Politics and Prose @ Busboys and Poets". In May 2017, Politics & Prose announced that they would be opening a new branch at Union Market in the fall of 2017. Politics & Prose announced plans for a third location to open in October 2017 at The Wharf, a new development at the Southwest Waterfront.

During the COVID-19 pandemic, Politics and Prose was required to shut down by city officials as part of Washington, D.C.'s shutdown. The store was one of the first six inside D.C. that was allowed to re-open, as part of a pilot program allowing curbside sales for independently owned stores from Mayor Muriel Bowser's Educational and Academic Retail Shops pilot. The store on Connecticut Avenue re-opened, while mandating that only 30 customers could enter the store at one time, and with plexiglass placed to protect workers.

=== Unionization ===
Workers at Politics and Prose announced in mid-December, 2021 that they intended to unionize with Local 400 of the United Food and Commercial Workers. A super-majority of workers across departments signed union authorization cards and asked management for voluntary recognition, which management refused. Thereafter, the workers filed for a union election with the National Labor Relations Board. The owners of Politics and Prose initially hired attorneys from Jones Day, which local DC news outlet DCist described as, "known for its aggressive anti-union tactics" to fight the unionization effort. Two weeks later, the co-owners pivoted and instead hired a D.C. labor attorney who represents unions and nonprofits to negotiate the scope of the union. Graham and Muscatine voluntarily recognized the union as the collective bargaining unit for the bookstore after 35 of 54 union authorization cards were signed by workers, making the store the first unionized book store in D.C.

== Services and reputation ==
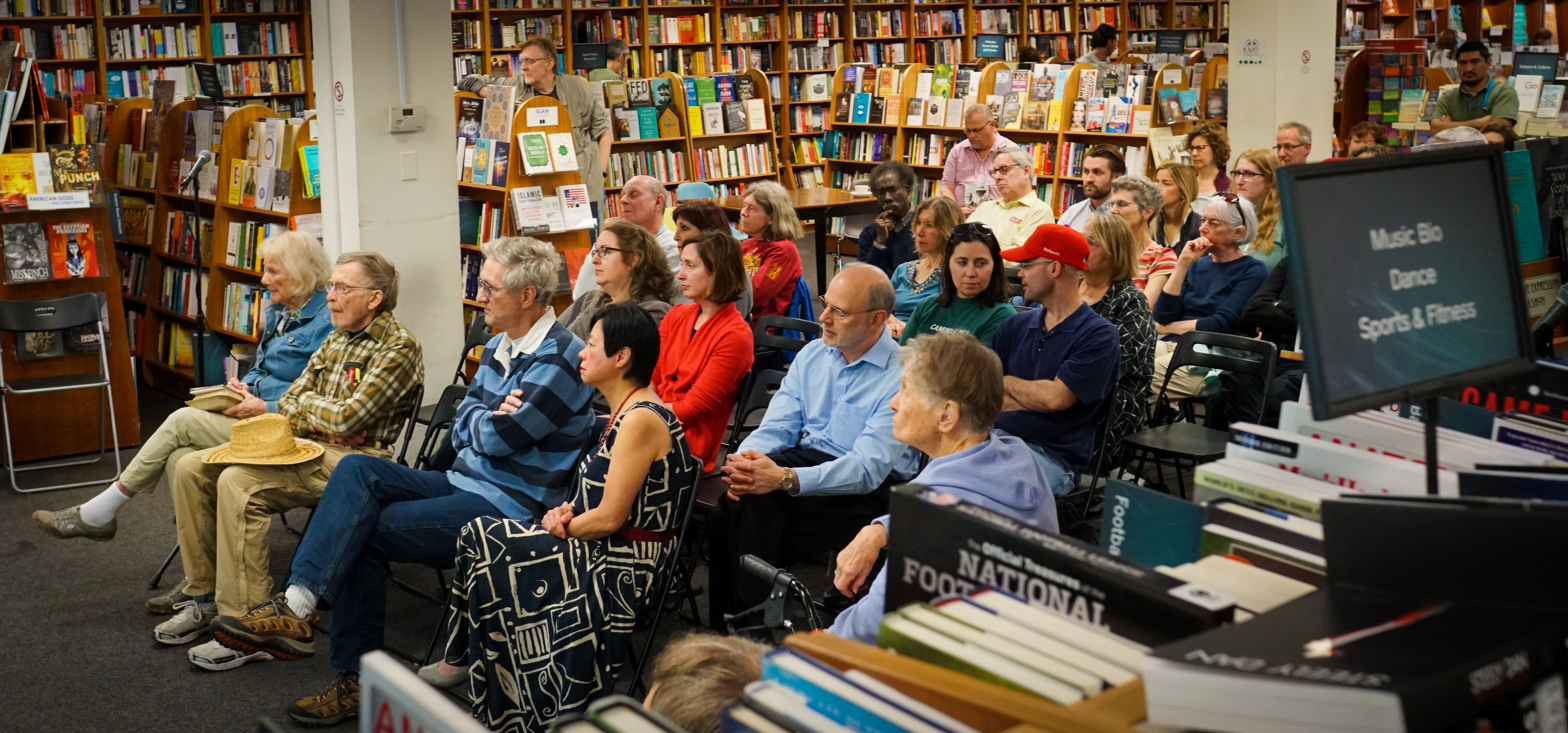
A crowd listens to a book reading at the store.

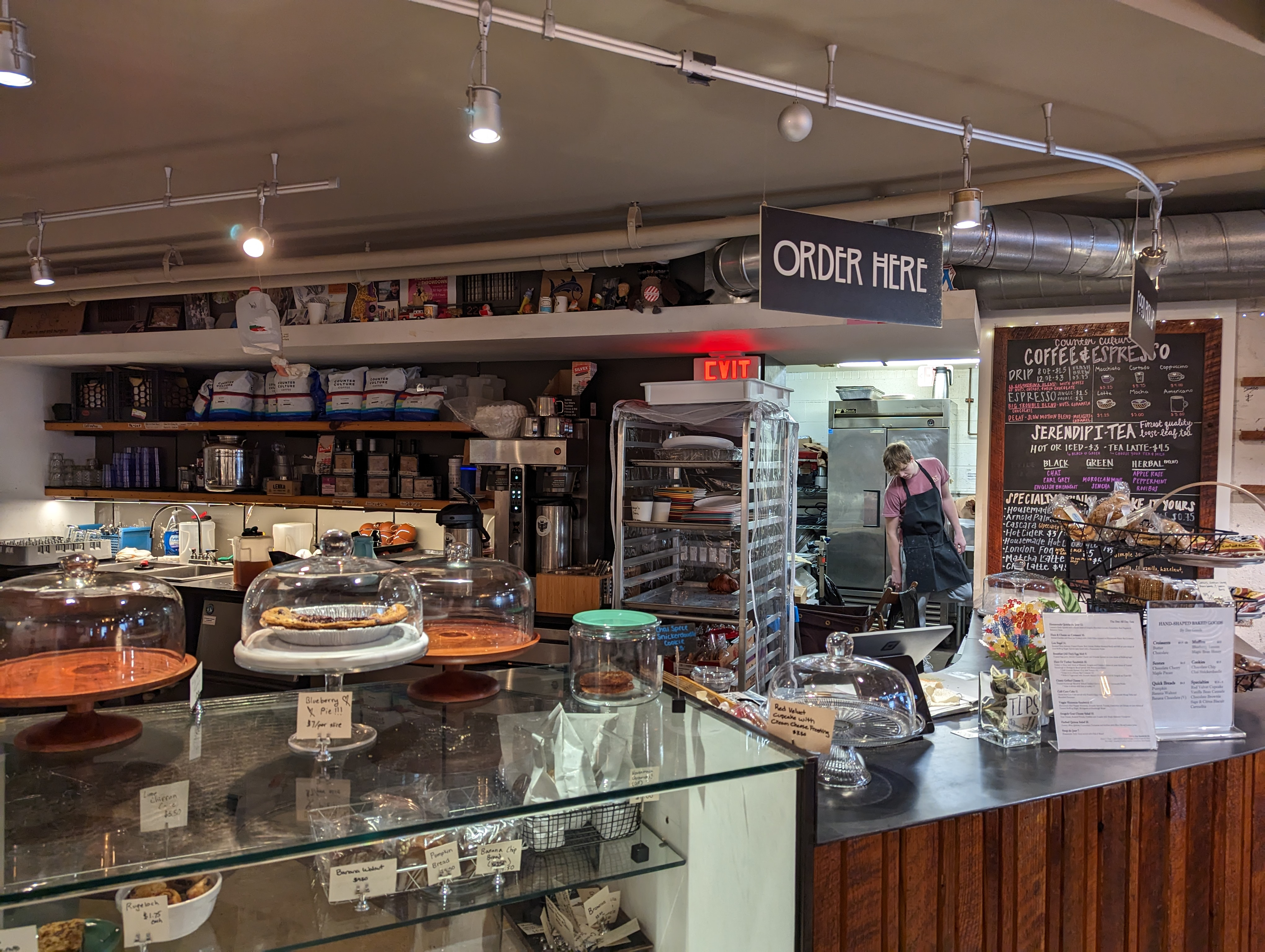
The bookstore cafe

Politics and Prose has a reputation for staff who are able to recommend books to customers. The 14,000-square-foot (1,300-square-meter) space in their Chevy Chase location contains an Espresso Book Machine for on-demand printing of self-published and out-of-print books and a cafe on the first floor of the building called "Modern Times" in addition to space for books. A Washington Post review of the cafe in 2006 reacted favorably to changes to the menu.

The store is famous for its author events, in which writers usually read an excerpt from their book and take questions from the audience. The Washington Post notes that as the talks gained prominence and the store grew more popular, Cohen and Meade, the original co-owners, "became known as literary tastemakers". C-SPAN broadcasts around five of the talks a month; and audio and video recordings of most talks are released on the Internet Archive and the Politics and Prose YouTube channel respectively. The store has gained a reputation for having astute and smart audiences present at readings. Famous readers at its author events have included politicians such as Presidents Bill Clinton and Barack Obama, UK statesman Boris Johnson, and former Senator Edward Brooke, as well as authors J.K. Rowling, Salman Rushdie, and Amy Chua, photographer Annie Leibovitz, and investigative reporter David Halberstam. Cohen in the past refused to allow prominent writers to appear in the store, such as Matt Drudge, ostensibly because of their conservative leanings.

Politics and Prose is often seen to be an important stop for authors publicizing their work and is regarded as being a significant part of DC culture. New owners Bradley Graham and Lissa Muscatine were ranked #50 on GQ's "The 50 Most Powerful People in Washington" because of their purchase of Politics and Prose, describing the store as "...liberal Washington's most sacred space." The New Yorker's Hendrik Hertzberg commented on the unusually intelligent questions from the audience at readings, and Slate's editor in 2007, said: "If there's one bookstore in the city you want to read in, it's obviously the place."
