= Dominican Sisters of Sinsinawa =

Roman Catholic religious congregation for women

Coordinates: 42°31′25.74″N 90°32′30.77″W

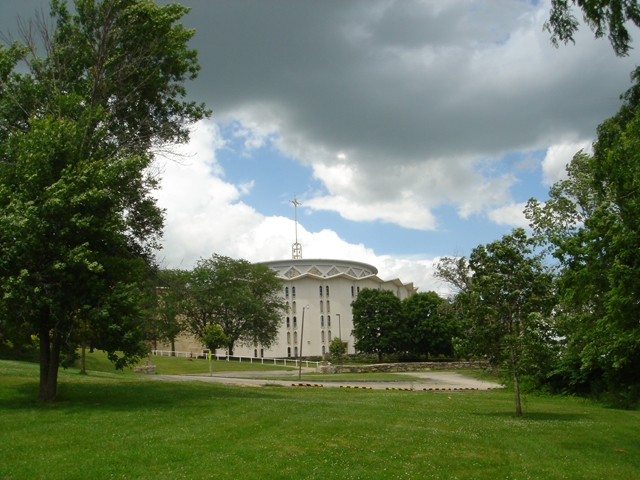
Sinsinawa Dominican Sisters house

The Congregation of the Most Holy Rosary of the Order of Preachers, better known as the Dominican Sisters of Sinsinawa, is an American religious institute of the Regular, or religious, branch of the Third Order of St. Dominic. It was founded in 1847. The General Motherhouse is located in Sinsinawa, Wisconsin.

== History ==
The congregation was founded in 1847 by Samuel Mazzuchelli, O.P., (1806-1864) a pioneer Italian Dominican friar and missionary priest to the Upper Midwest. By the time of the founder's death in 1864, the community numbered nearly 25, and had blossomed to 100 within a decade. By the end of the century, the congregation had grown to almost 400 Sisters, and had begun to spread to work in schools throughout the region. Growth continued until the mid-20th century, when the congregation peaked at nearly 2,000 members in the 1960s. Like many other religious institutes, numbers then began to drop dramatically after the Second Vatican Council. Most of the archives for the order have been moved to the Catholic Religious Archives at Boston College.

== Overview ==
The motherhouse of the congregation, Sinsinawa Mound, has been called the "Hill of Grace". Since 1847, more than 3,200 women have ascended its slopes to take their vows as Sinsinawa Dominican Sisters, then departed to preach and teach the Gospel. Today, the Mound still serves as the motherhouse for more than 200 sisters and about 200 associates.

== Apostolate ==
Sinsinawa Dominicans are called to proclaim the Gospel through the ministry of preaching and teaching to participate in the building of a holy and just society. These Dominican Sisters are associated with Edgewood University in Madison, Wisconsin (edgewood.edu), and Dominican University in River Forest, Illinois.

=== Ministry today ===
Direction 2023–28:

As joyful contemplative preachers, the Dominicans of Sinsinawa will take the risks that the Gospel demands to respond to the needs of the world. Ignited by our search for Truth, we call ourselves to—

• Advocate for justice and practice social, ecological, and economic responsibility as called for in Laudato Si’ and our corporate stances; • Challenge injustices in the institutional Church and be a reconciling presence in the spirit of Dominic and Catherine; • Become antiracist and practice nonviolence in word and action; • Strive for authenticity and integrity in our relationships with God, with one another, and with all Creation; • Be a healing and compassionate presence to one another and to those on the margins; • Embrace diversity as a blessing and cultivate a spirit of invitation and belonging; and • Nurture and honor one another in our spiritual growth and expressions of faith.

Sinsinawa Dominican sisters are dedicated to preaching and teaching the Gospel, believing that at the heart of ministry is relationship. The sisters are called to a wide variety of ministries: some are teachers, counselors, and caregivers. Others are doctors, lawyers, and pastoral ministers. They remain involved in more than 30 ministries at locations throughout the United States, Bolivia, and Trinidad and Tobago.

== People ==
- Sister Mary Clemente Davlin, a noted medievalist and advocate for campus diversity.
- Sister Gregory Duffy (1912-1995), theater professor at Rosary College (now Domincan University) and advisor on religious life for The Sound of Music.
- Sister Rosemary Gannon O.P., the choral director of Trinity High School choirs in River Forest, Illinois, who appeared in Home Alone movie.
- Sister Albertus Magnus McGrath (1911 – 1978), advocate for women, history department chair at Rosary College (now Dominican University).
