= Mary Clemente Davlin =

American professor and nun

Sister Mary Clemente Davlin O. P.
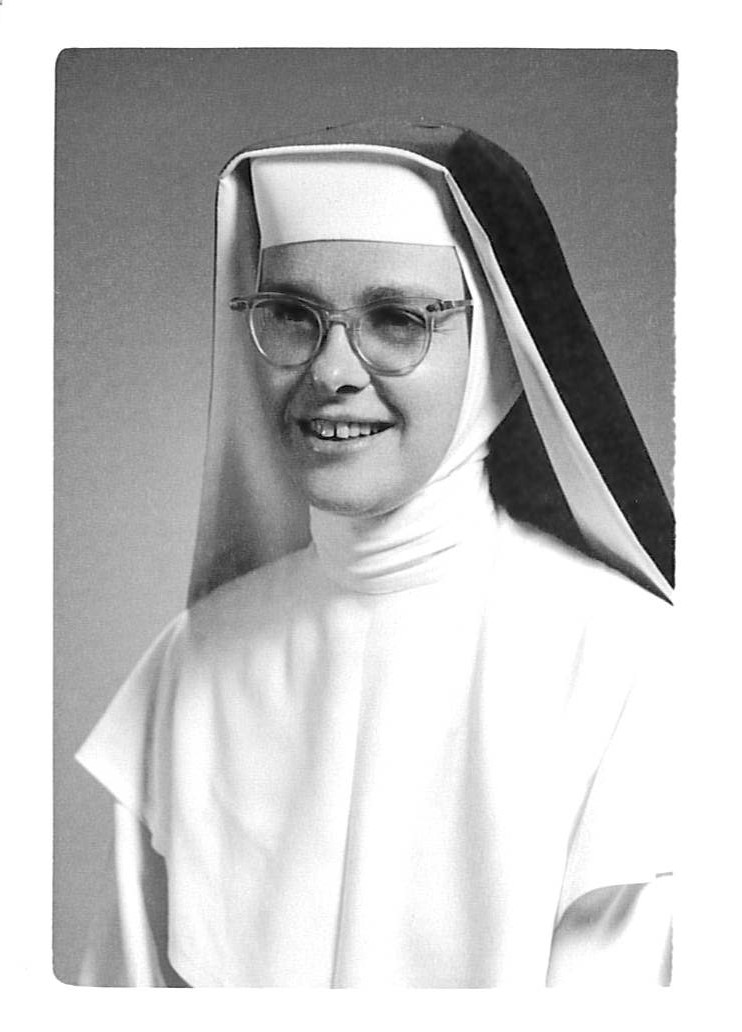
- Portrait courtesy of the Sinsinawa Dominican Congregation archives.

Personal life
- Born: March 6, 1929 Chicago, Illinois, U.S.
- Died: December 19, 2017 (aged 88) Hazel Green, Wisconsin, U.S.

Religious life
- Religion: Roman Catholic

Mary Clemente Davlin (March 6, 1929 – December 19, 2017) was an American Sinsinawa Dominican Sister, an advocate for diversity in higher education, and a noted scholar of medieval studies, particularly the allegorical poem Piers Plowman. The Sister Mary Clemente Davlin Diversity Leadership Award at Dominican University is given annually in her honor, as is a Waters, Davlin, Crapo “sisters” scholarship specifically for African American students.

== Early life and education ==
Marguerite "Marge" Davlin was born on Chicago's South Side to Mary Margaret Ryan Davlin and John Joseph Davlin. She was known as Marge all her life. In Chicago she attended St. Philip Neri elementary school and Aquinas Dominican high school. She earned a bachelor's degree at Rosary College (now the Arts and Sciences sub-college of Dominican University) and a master's degree at the University of Wisconsin Madison, after which she studied Italian and violin at the Pius XII Institute in Florence, Italy. She earned a doctorate at the University of California Berkeley, working with noted medievalist Charles Muscatine (further notable for being fired for refusing to sign a McCarthy oath), whose work V. A. Kolve called "the gold standard in our field." She wrote her 1964 dissertation on Piers Plowman. She completed summer studies at Cambridge University, Sophia University in Tokyo, Loyola University Chicago, and Chicago Musical College.

== Teaching, devotion to campus diversity, music ==
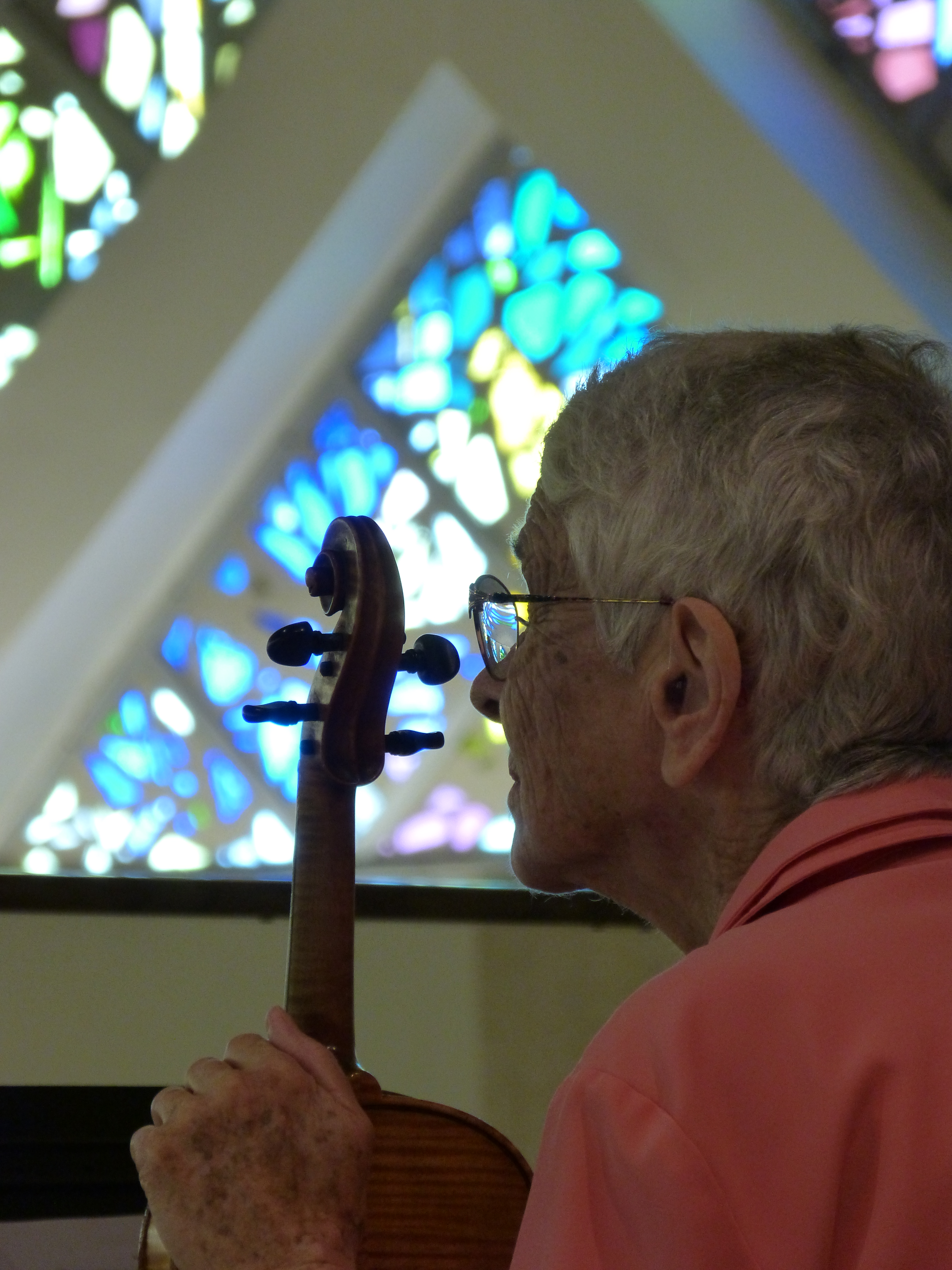
Courtesy of the Sinsinawa Dominican Congregation archives.

She taught at Aquinas High School and DuSable High School on Chicago's South Side before entering the Dominican Sisters of Sinsinawa novitiate in Wisconsin. She then taught English at Edgewood College in Madison, Wisconsin for three years, went to Berkeley for her doctorate, and then returned to serve for seven more years, six as department chair.

She joined the faculty of the Rosary College of Arts and Sciences of Dominican University in 1970. Then in fall of 1973 she became department chair. Her main contributions were in diversity. "She spent a lifetime working hard to broaden and diversify Dominican’s student body," said Mickey Sweeney, a professor of English at Rosary College. "She felt it was especially important to strengthen Dominican’s relationships to African-American students and families."

Sr. Davlin also tutored at Malcolm X College after retirement, and played second violin in the Oak Park-River Forest Symphony from 1970 onward, becoming one of its longest-serving members. She was an expert on the medieval allegorical poem Piers Plowman, and led academic seminars and even religious retreats based on the text. She was a member of the Medieval Academy of America, the Modern Language Association, and the Langland Society.

== Awards ==
- National Endowment for the Humanities research fellowship, 1984, 1991.
- Newberry Library-British Academy fellowship, 1981.
- Caritas Veritas Award, the highest alumni honor of Dominican University, 2000
- Mother Evelyn Murphy award for excellence in teaching, Dominican University, 1973, 1997.
- Diversity Award, Dominican University, 2003.
- Teacher-scholar Illinois Humanities Council, 2000.
- Marquis Who's Who, 1984–2017.
- Directory of American Scholars, English, Speech & Drama, 1974–2017.
- Who's Who in the Midwest, 1984–2017.

== Publications ==
All titles are in order from newest to oldest.
BOOKS

- A Journey Into Love: Meditating With Piers Plowman (Los Angeles: Marymount Institute Press, 2008).
- The Place of God in Piers Plowman and Medieval Art (Aldershot, UK: Ashgate, 2001).
- A Game of Heuene: Word Play and the Meaning of Piers Plowman B (Cambridge, U.K.: Boydell & Brewer, 1989).

ARTICLES

- "Style and Stylistics in the Work of Charles Muscatine: A Retrospective," Chaucer Review 53 (2018): 112-18 (posthumous).
- “Genealogical Terms in Piers Plowman,” The Yearbook of Langland Studies, vol. 26 (2012), 111–32.
- "In Memoriam: Charles Muscatine (1920-2010)," Chaucer Review 45 (2011): 248–51.
- "God and the Human Body in Piers Plowman" Chaucer Review 46 (2011): 147-65 (special issue in honor of C. David Benson).
- "Devotional Postures in Piers Plowman B, with an Appendix on Divine Postures," Chaucer Review 42 (2007): 161–79.
- "The Kindness of God: The Holy Spirit in Piers Plowman," Spirituality 10 (56) (2004): 275–79.
- “Kynde Knowying as a Middle English Equivalent for ‘Wisdom’ in Piers Plowman B," Medium Ævum 50 (1) (1981): 5–17. doi:10.2307/43632063.
- “A Genius-Kynde Illustration in Codex Vaticanus Palatinus Latinus 629," Manuscripta: A Journal for Manuscript Research 23 (1979): 149–58.
- "Petrus, id est, Christus: Piers the Plowman as 'The Whole Christ,'" Chaucer Review 6 (1972): 280–92.
- “Kynde Knowyng as a Major Theme in Piers Plowman B," The Review of English Studies 22 (85) (1971): 1–19.

CHAPTERS IN BOOKS

- “Falling in Love with Piers Plowman," in Thomas A. Goodmann, editor, Approaches to Teaching Langland’s Piers Plowman, (New York: The Modern Language Association of America, 2018), 171–79.
- “The Style of Prayer in Piers Plowman," in 'Truthe Is the Beste': A Festschrift in Honour of A.V.C. Schmidt, (Pieterlen and Bern: Peter Lang, 2014), 65–85.
- “Piers Plowman as Biblical Commentary,” in Essays in Medieval Studies: Proceedings of the Illinois Medieval Association (Chicago: Medieval Studies Association, 2003).
- “Chaucer and Langland as Religious Writers," in Kathleen M. Hewett-Smith, editor, William Langland's Piers Plowman: A Book of Essays, (New York: Routledge Medieval Casebooks, 2001), 119–41.
- “Piers Plowman and the Gospel and First Epistle of John," The Yearbook of Langland Studies 10, 1996, 89–127.
- “Tower and Tabernacle: The Architecture of Heaven and the Language of Dwelling with/in God in the B-Text of Piers Plowman," Essays in Medieval Studies: Proceedings of the Illinois Medieval Association 10, 1993, 99–110.

== Death and impact ==
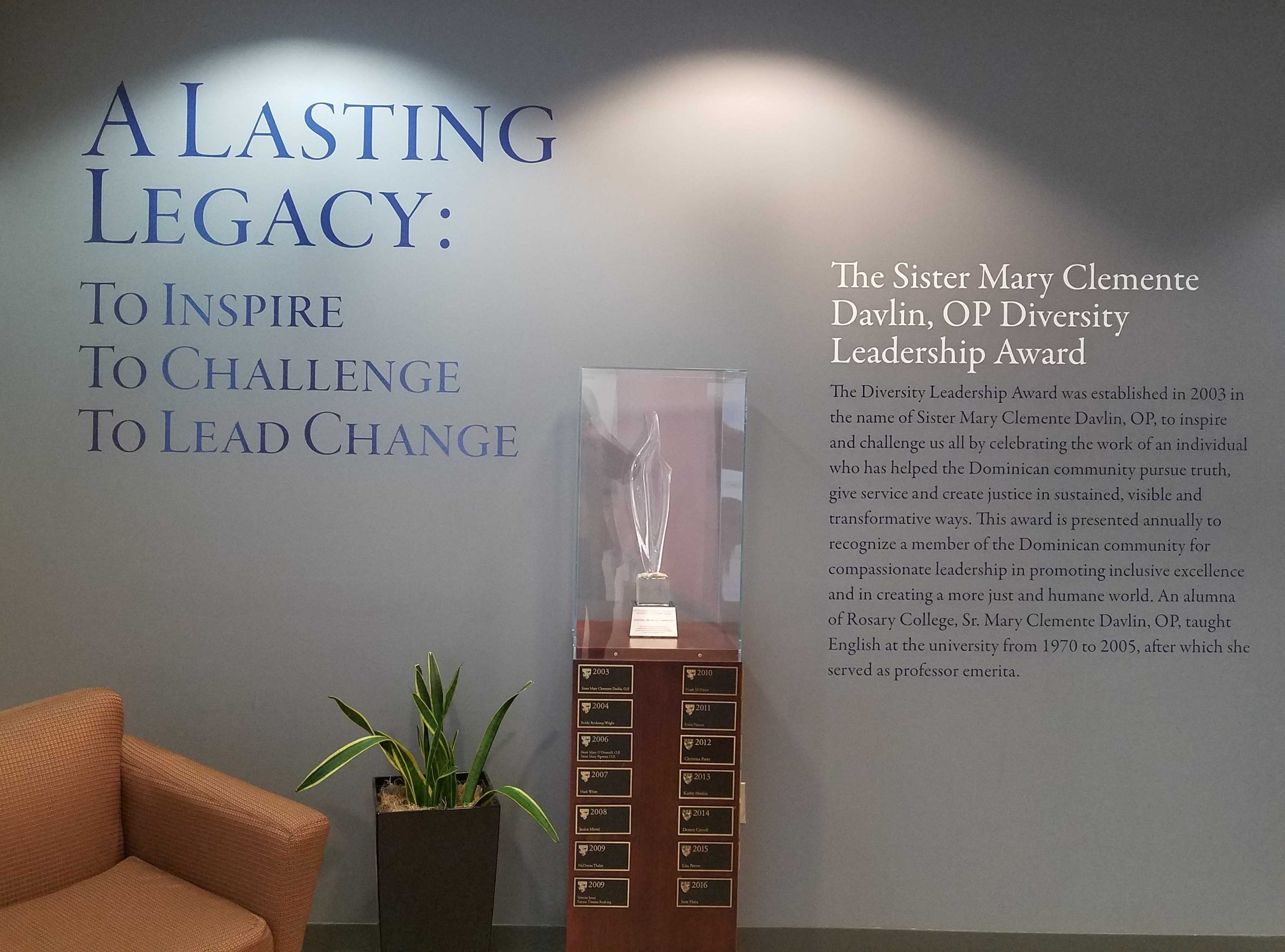
Sister Mary Clemente Davlin, OP Diversity Leadership Award bestowed annually by Dominican University of River Forest, Illinois

She died at St. Dominic Villa in Hazel Green, Wisconsin. Hundreds of people packed into Rosary Chapel at Dominican University for her funeral. Dominican University President Donna M. Carroll presided, and the Rev. Richard Woods celebrated the mass. Scholarships such as the Waters, Davlin, Crapo "Sisters" scholarship (for African-American students with financial need), continue in her name, and Dominican University also gives the Sister Mary Clemente Davlin Diversity Leadership Award to faculty at the annual Caritas Veritas Symposium.
