= Lissa Muscatine =

American former political consultant (born 1954)

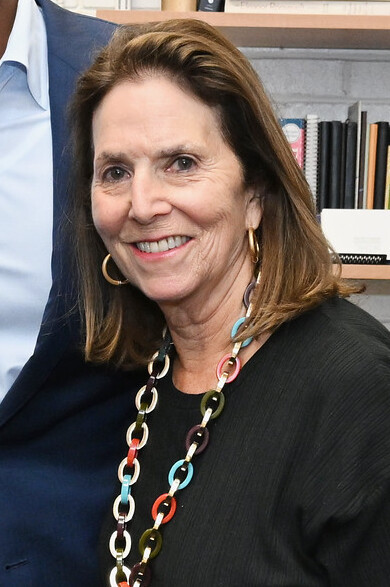
- Muscatine in 2025

Deputy Assistant to the President of the United States
- In office 2000–2001
- President: Bill Clinton

Director of Communications to the First Lady of the United States
- In office 2000–2001
- President: Bill Clinton
- First Lady: Hillary Clinton

Special Assistant to the President of the United States
- In office 1996–1998
- President: Bill Clinton

Personal details
- Born: Alison Muscatine; 1954 (age 71–72) California, U.S.
- Party: Democratic
- Spouse: Bradley Graham
- Children: 3
- Parent: Charles Muscatine (father)
- Education: Harvard University (BA); Oxford University (PPE)

Alison "Lissa" Muscatine (born 1954) is an American former journalist and political aide who was the chief speechwriter for First Lady Hillary Clinton during the Clinton administration, a role in which she is credited with writing some of the most significant speeches of Clinton's public career, including her Women's rights are human rights address at the Fourth World Conference on Women in 1995.

Muscatine later served as chief of speechwriting and senior adviser to Clinton during her tenure as secretary of state. Since 2011, she has co-owned Politics and Prose, an independent bookstore in Washington, D.C., with her husband Bradley Graham, a former editor for The Washington Post.

== Early life and education ==
Alison Muscatine was born in California in 1954 to Dora and Charles Muscatine. She attended Willard Middle School. She received her Bachelor of Arts from Harvard University, and was awarded a Rhodes Scholarship to Oxford University in 1997, where she studied philosophy, politics, and economics.

== Career ==
Before entering public service, Muscatine worked as a journalist, editing and writing for The Washington Post, The Washington Star, and the Delta Democrat Times. She was a contributor to The New York Times and a number of magazines.

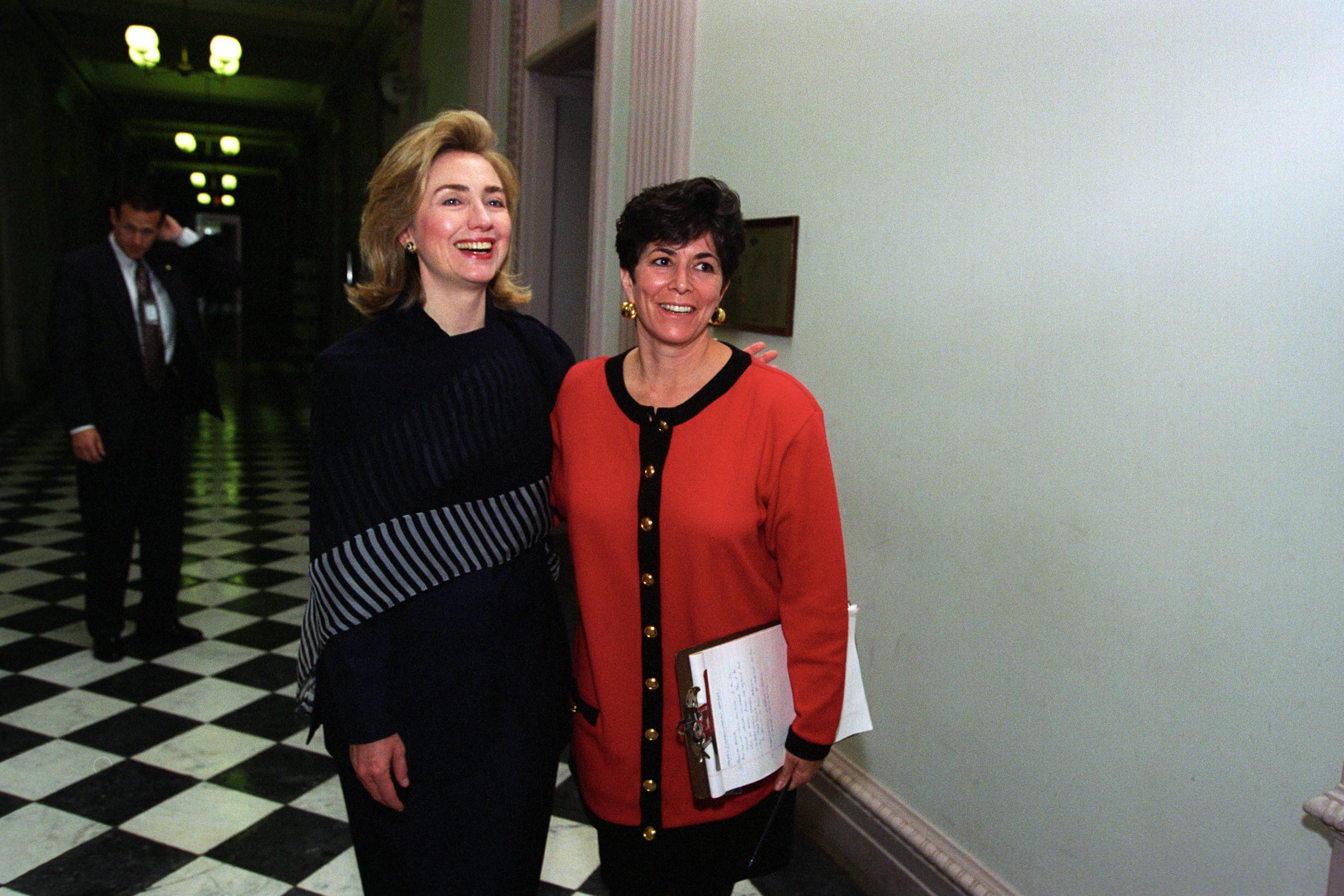
Clinton and Muscatine in 1995

From 1993 to 1998, Muscatine served as a speechwriter to President Bill Clinton, though she mostly wrote for First Lady Hillary Clinton; she was special assistant to the president from 1996 to 1998. From 2000 to 2001, Muscatine was deputy assistant to the president as well as Hillary's director of communications. Muscatine helped write Hillary's Creators Syndicate column, Talking It Over, as well as Hillary's 1996 book It Takes a Village.

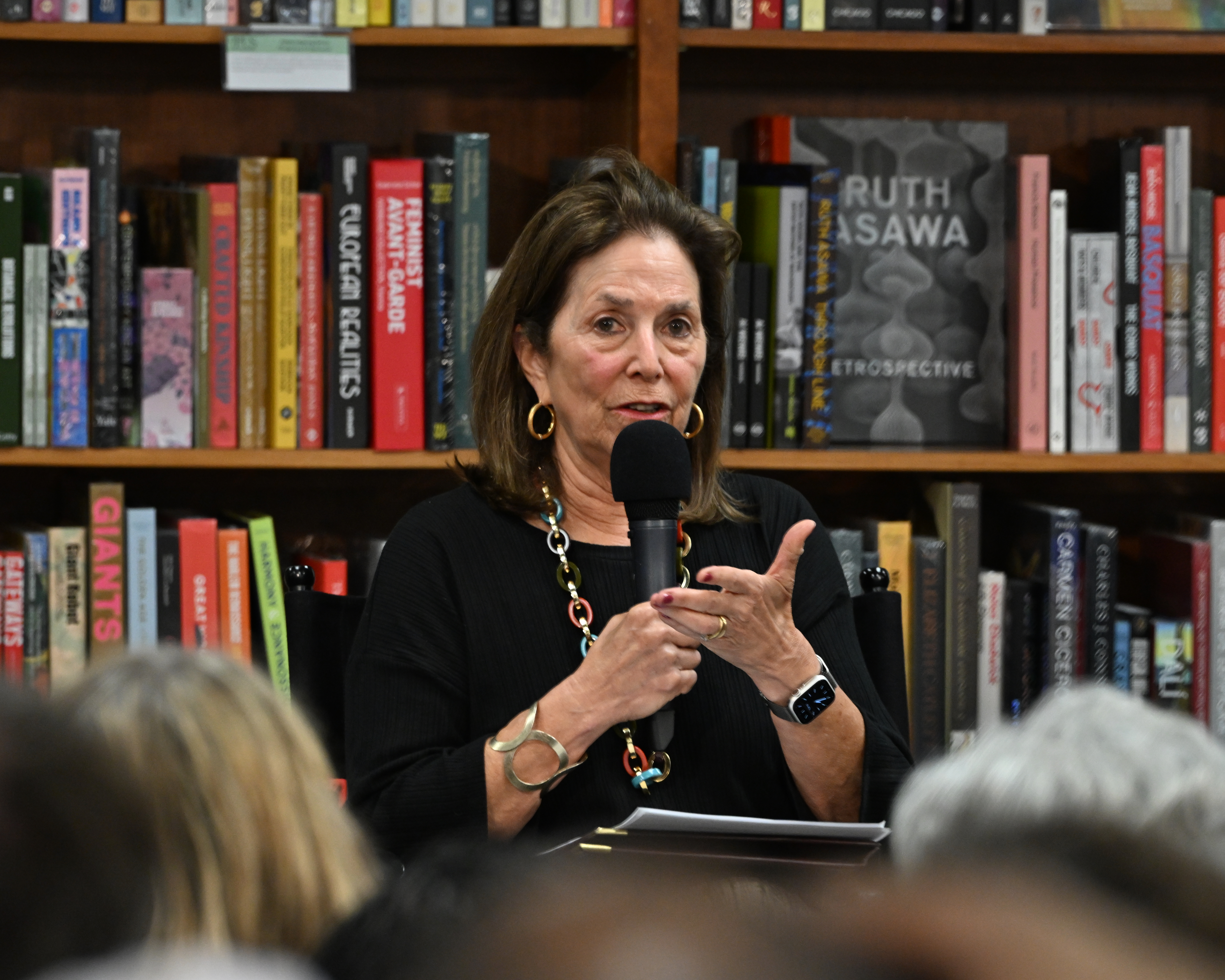
Muscatine speaking at a Politics and Prose event in 2025

After Bill Clinton left the White House, Muscatine collaborated with Hillary on her 2003 memoir Living History. She went on to work as a speechwriter and senior advisor to Hillary during her 2008 presidential campaign, and from 2009 to 2011, she served as both chief of speechwriting and senior adviser to Hillary while she was secretary of state.

In 2011, Muscatine purchased the Politics and Prose bookstore in Washington, D.C. Muscatine is writing a book, Hillaryland, detailing her time in Hillary's eponymous inner circle. Though she played no formal role in Hillary's 2016 presidential campaign, Muscatine–described by The Washington Post as a "still very much a Clinton loyalist"–publicly urged her former boss to go off-script and be more candid with voters.

Muscatine was the campaign treasurer for Wes Moore's 2022 Maryland gubernatorial campaign, but stepped down from the role in December 2021.

== Personal life ==
Muscatine is married to Bradley Graham, whom she met while working at The Washington Post. The couple live in Bethesda, Maryland, with their daughter, Wynne, and two sons, Cole and Max. Muscatine, a member of the Democratic Party, endorsed Hillary in the 2016 presidential election.
