= Sophia Minnaert =

American journalist

Sophia Minnaert (born July 23, 1987) is an American sports field reporter most known for her work with the Milwaukee Brewers.

== Broadcasting career ==
In 2012, Minnaert was hired by Fox Sports Wisconsin (now the FanDuel Sports Network) to work in the social media department. Starting in 2013, she began as an on-air sideline reporter for FSW. During her time at the network, she worked both Brewers and Milwaukee Bucks telecasts into 2018.

Since 2018, she has been a full-time member of the Brewers broadcast team, primarily as the Broadcast and Digital Features Content Director in addition to serving as the primary sideline reporter. She regularly conducts Spanish-language interviews with Spanish-speaking Brewers players, translating for the English-speaking audience in real-time.

== Accolades ==
Minnaert has won two Emmy awards: in 2013 for the documentary Baseball in the Dominican Republic and in 2018 for Outstanding Crafts Achievement for On-Camera Talent.

The Milwaukee Business Journal named Minnaert to its 40 under 40 list in 2020.

In 2022, she was the first woman to be named the Wisconsin Sportscaster of the Year, an award first given in 1959, by the National Sports Media Association. She received the award again in 2024.

Minnaert is part of a Brewers broadcast team often ranked among the best in baseball. In Awful Announcing's 2026 ranking of MLB broadcast teams, Minnaert was recognized by graders as "the best field reporter in sports."

== Education ==
Minnaert is a graduate of Edgewood High School in Madison, Wisconsin.

In 2009, she graduated from Marquette University, where she studied Spanish and journalism. In 2026, Marquette University's Diederich College of Communication presented Minnaert with the Young Alumna of the Year Award.

== Personal life ==
Minnaert is a native of Madison, Wisconsin. Her mother is from Costa Rica and her father, Al Minnaert, is the winningest high school football coach in Madison history – 155 wins in 26 seasons – and is now retired from Edgewood High School. She grew up speaking both English and Spanish at home.
