= John M. Ganim =

American author

John Michael Ganim
- Born: February 18, 1945 Weehawken, New Jersey
- Areas: professor, writer
- Notable works: Style and Consciousness in Middle English Narrative, Medievalism and Orientalism: Three Essays on Literature, Architecture and Cultural Identity

John M. Ganim (born 1945) (B.A. Rutgers, 1967, magna cum laude; M.A., Ph.D. Indiana University, 1969, 1974 respectively) is an American author. Style and Consciousness in Middle English Narrative (1983) and Chaucerian Theatricality (1990) were both published by Princeton University Press, while his third, Medievalism and Orientalism: Three Essays on Literature, Architecture and Cultural Identity (2005) was translated into Arabic in 2012 as الاستشراق والقرون الوسطى by the Kalima Foundation. His most recent book, Cosmopolitanism and the Middle Ages, co-edited with Shayne Legassie, was published in 2013.

He has published over 50 articles and book chapters on medieval literature as well as on how the medieval is engaged in film, architecture and political theory. He began his academic career at the University of California, Riverside in 1974, moving from a lecturer to an assistant professor. From there, through consistent research, teaching, presentations and memberships in academic groups, he has moved up the ranks to become a Distinguished Professor of English starting in 2014. For example, he has served as president (2006–2008) of the New Chaucer Society and is currently vice-president of the Pacific Ancient and Modern Language Association. In addition, he was the recipient of a Guggenheim Fellowship from 2001 to 2002 and, in 2013–2014, received the Distinguished Humanist Research Award from the College of Arts, Humanities and Social Sciences at the University of California at Riverside.
