= Charles Muscatine =

American academic

- Born: November 28, 1920; New York City, U.S.
- Died: March 12, 2010 (aged 89); Oakland, California, U.S.
- Children: 2, including Lissa

Academic background
- Education: Yale University

Academic work
- Discipline: Medieval literature
- Institutions: University of California, Berkeley; Wesleyan University

Charles Muscatine (28 November 1920 – 12 March 2010) was an American academic specializing in medieval literature, particularly Chaucer. Following service in the U.S. Navy during World War II, he returned home to complete his studies and went on to become a tutor at UC Berkeley. He was fired from his position there for refusing to sign a McCarthyite oath. He challenged the termination in court and won reinstatement to his post at Berkeley in a landmark 1951 court decision.

== Background ==
Muscatine was born in Brooklyn to Samuel and Bertha (Greenberg) Mushkatin, Jewish immigrants from the Russian Empire (now Belarus). The family moved to Trenton, New Jersey, where his father managed a department store. Muscatine studied English at Yale and served in the U.S. Navy during World War II, participating in the D-day landing on Omaha Beach. After the war he returned to Yale where he became one of the first Jews to take a doctorate in the English department. He joined the English department at UC Berkeley in 1948.

== Loyalty oath controversy ==
Shortly after he was hired, the State of California began enforcing a state law, the Levering Act, requiring public employees to sign a loyalty oath, and more than 11,000 University of California employees signed rather than risk losing their jobs. Muscatine was one of 31 academics who refused to sign the loyalty oath, and he was fired for his refusal. Muscatine later explained his rationale in refusing to sign the loyalty oath:

I felt that in the first place it was a violation of the oath to the U.S. Constitution that I had already taken. And secondly it was a violation of academic freedom, which is the idea that in a free society scholars and teachers are allowed to express and believe anything that they feel to be true. As a young assistant professor, I had been insisting to the kids that you stick to your guns and you tell it the way you see it and you think for yourself and you express things for yourself and I felt that I couldn't really justify teaching students if I weren't behaving the same way. So I simply couldn't sign the oath.

Muscatine and others who were dismissed challenged the action in court and ultimately won a landmark victory when the California Court of Appeal in April 1951 ordered the University of California to reinstate the fired academics. In its decision, the Court of Appeal wrote:

Any other conclusion would be to approve that which from the beginning of our government has been denounced as the most effective means by which one special brand of political or economic philosophy can entrench and perpetuate itself to the eventual exclusion of all others; the imposition of any more inclusive test would be the forerunner of tyranny and oppression. ... While this court is mindful of the fact that the action of the regents was at the outset undoubtedly motivated by a desire to protect the university from the influences of subversive elements dedicated to the overthrow of our constitutional government and the abolition of our civil liberties, we are also keenly aware that equal to the danger of subversion from without by means of force and violence is the danger of subversion from within by the gradual whittling away and the resulting disintegration of the very pillars of our freedom.

Muscatine taught at Wesleyan University before being reinstated in 1952.

== Scholarship ==
In 1966, as head of the UC Berkeley Academic Senate-appointed Committee on Educational Policy, he presided over an influential report that called for increased diversity in educational programs available to students.

His contributions to medieval studies include Chaucer and the French Tradition: A Study in Style and Meaning (University of California Press, 1957), The Book of Geoffrey Chaucer, The Old French Fabliaux, and Poetry and Crisis in the Age of Chaucer. He also published extensively on the issues facing third-level education, including Fixing College Education: A New Curriculum for the Twenty-First Century, completed shortly before his death.

David Lawton, the executive director of the New Chaucer Society, said of Chaucer and the French Tradition: "It remains astonishingly undated. The sheer quality of Muscatine’s reading continues to set an almost impossibly high standard, and virtually single-handedly he opened up Chaucer studies to France and Chaucer’s secular, French heritage. There has been a huge growth in this field, most of it following along the routes he made."

Charles Muscatine died of a lung infection at Kaizer Permanente Medical Center in Oakland, California on 12 March 2010. His wife, Doris, died in 2006; they had two children, Lissa and Jeffrey.

== Notable students ==
He directed the dissertation of Sister Mary Clemente Davlin, who became a noted medievalist.
