= Alastair Minnis =

Northern Irish literary critic and historian of ideas (born 1948)

Alastair James Minnis (born 1948) is a Northern Irish literary critic and historian of ideas who has written extensively about medieval literature, and contributed substantially to the study of late-medieval theology and philosophy.

== Early life and education ==
After obtaining his B.A. at the Queen's University of Belfast, Minnis matriculated at Keble College, Oxford as a visiting graduate student, where he completed work on his Belfast Ph.D. (awarded 1975), receiving mentorship from Malcolm Parkes and Beryl Smalley.

== Career ==
Following appointments at the Queen's University of Belfast (lecturer, 1972–81) and Bristol University (lecturer, later reader, 1981–87), he was appointed Professor of Medieval Literature at the University of York; also Director of the Centre for Medieval Studies and later Head of English & Related Literature. From 2003 to 2006, he was a Humanities Distinguished Professor at Ohio State University, Columbus, from where he moved to Yale University. In 2008, he was named Douglas Tracy Smith Professor of English at Yale.

=== Honours and appointments ===
Minnis is a Fellow of the English Association (2000), a Fellow of the Medieval Academy of America (2001), and an Honorary Member of the Royal Irish Academy (2016). From 2012 to 2014, he served as president of the New Chaucer Society. He was general editor of the Cambridge University Press series Cambridge Studies in Medieval Literature from 1987 to 2018 and holds an honorary master's degree from Yale (2007) and an honorary doctorate from the University of York (2018). The University of York also bestowed on him the honorific title of Emeritus Professor of Medieval Literature (2018). He has long been involved in the activities of the John Gower Society and holds the post of vice president as of 2023. In 2023, he received a festschrift edited by Andrew Kraebel, Ardis Butterfield, and Ian Johnson.

== Selected publications ==
=== Major books and edited collections ===
- Chaucer and Pagan Antiquity (Woodbridge: Boydell and Brewer, 1982).
- (ed.) Gower's Confessio amantis: Responses and Reassessments (Cambridge: D.S. Brewer, 1983).
- Medieval Theory of Authorship: Scholastic Literary Attitudes in the Later Middle Ages (London: Scolar Press, 1984).
- (ed.) The Medieval Boethius: Studies in the Vernacular Translations of 'De Consolatione Philosophiae' (Woodbridge: Boydell and Brewer, 1987).
- (with A.B. Scott, ed.), Medieval Literary Theory and Criticism c.1100 c.1375: The Commentary Tradition (Oxford: Clarendon Press, 1988).
- (ed.) Latin and Vernacular: Studies in Late-Medieval Texts and Manuscripts, York Manuscripts Conferences: Proceedings Series, 1 (Cambridge & Woodbridge: Boydell and Brewer, 1989).
- Chaucer's Shorter Poems. [Includes contributions by V.J. Scattergood and J.J. Smith.] (Oxford: Clarendon Press, 1995).
- (ed., with C. C. Morse and T. Turville-Petre), Essays on Ricardian Literature in Honour of J.A. Burrow (Oxford: Clarendon Press, 1997).
- (ed., with Peter Biller), Medieval Theology and the Natural Body, York Studies in Medieval Theology I (York: York Medieval Press in association with Boydell and Brewer, 1997).
- (ed., with Peter Biller), Handling Sin: Confession in Late-Medieval Culture, York Studies in Medieval Theology II (York: York Medieval Press, in association with Boydell and Brewer, 1998).
- (ed., with Tim William Machan), The Sources of Chaucer's 'Boece' (Athens and London: University of Georgia Press, 2005).
- Magister Amoris: The 'Roman de la Rose' and Vernacular Hermeneutics (Oxford: Oxford University Press, 2001).
- (ed., with Ian Johnson), The Cambridge History of Literary Criticism, vol. 2: The Middle Ages (Cambridge: Cambridge University Press, 2005).
- (ed., with Jane Roberts), Text, Image, Interpretation: Studies in Anglo-Saxon Literature and its Insular Context in Honour of Éamonn Ó Carragáin (Turnhout: Brepols, 2007).
- Fallible Authors: Chaucer's Pardoner and Wife of Bath (Philadelphia: University of Pennsylvania Press, 2007).
- Translations of Authority in Medieval English Literature: Valuing the Vernacular (Cambridge: Cambridge University Press, 2009).
- (ed., with Rosalynn Voaden), Medieval Holy Women in the Christian Tradition, c. 1100–c. 1500 (Brepols, Turnhout, 2010).
- (ed., with Stephen Rigby). Historians on Chaucer: The General Prologue to the Canterbury Tales (Oxford: Oxford University Press, 2014).
- The Cambridge Introduction to Chaucer (Cambridge: Cambridge University Press, 2014).
- From Eden to Eternity: Creations of Paradise in the Later Middle Ages (Philadelphia: University of Pennsylvania Press, 2015).
- Hellish Imaginations from Augustine to Dante: An Essay in Metaphor and Materiality, Medium Ævum Monographs n.s. 37 (Oxford: The Society for the Study of Medieval Languages and Literature, 2020).
- Phantom Pains and Prosthetic Narratives: From George Dedlow to Dante, Cambridge Elements in Histories of Emotions and the Senses (Cambridge: Cambridge University Press, 2021).

=== Contributions to books (since 2015) ===
- "Unquiet Graves: Pearl and the Hope of Reunion", in Truth and Tales: Cultural Mobility and Medieval Media, ed. Nicholas Watson & Fiona Somerset (Columbus: Ohio State University Press, 2015), pp. 117–34.
- "Discourse beyond death: The Language of Heaven in the Middle English Pearl", in Language in Medieval Britain: Networks and Exchanges, ed. by Mary Carruthers, Harlaxton Medieval Studies, 25 (Shaun Tyas: Donington, 2015), pp. 214–28.
- "Reconciling amour and yconomique: Evrart de Conty's Ambition as Vernacular Commentator", in Traduire au XIVe siècle : Evrart de Conty et la vie intellectuelle à la cour de Charles V, ed. by Joëlle Ducos and Michèle Goyens (Éditions Honoré Champion: 2015), pp. 199–222.
- "Other Worlds: Chaucer's Classicism", in The Oxford History of Classical Reception in English Literature, Volume 1: 800-1558, ed. by Rita Copeland (Oxford: Oxford University Press, 2016), pp. 413–434.
- "Figuring the letter: Making sense of sensus litteralis in late-medieval Christian Exegesis", in Interpreting Scriptures in Judaism, Christianity and Islam: Overlapping Inquiries, ed. Mordechai Z. Cohen and Adele Berlin (Cambridge: Cambridge University Press, 2016), pp. 159–182. (The outcome of work by a research group based at the Institute of Advanced Studies in Jerusalem.)
- "The Prick of Conscience and the Imagination of Paradise", in: Pursuing Middle English Manuscripts and their Texts. Essays in Honour of Ralph Hanna, edited by Simon Horobin and Aditi Nafde (Turnhout: Brepols, 2016), pp. 127–40.
- "Secularity", in Geoffrey Chaucer in Context, ed. by Ian Johnson (Cambridge: Cambridge University Press, 2019), pp. 178–86, 453-54.
- 'Plotting the Purgatorio: The narrative significance of Dante's bodies of air', in La Trama del texto: Fuentes literarias y cultura escrita en la Edad Media y el Renacimiento, ed. Déborah González Martínez, Pilar Lorenzo Gradín and Carmen de Santiago Gómez (Salamanca and Santiago de Compostella, 2024), pp. 123–43. (The proceedings volume of the VIII Congresso La SEMYR)
- 'Imposing exemplarity: Chaucer's ethical framing of the pear tree novella', in Nouvelles et exemplarité (Proceedings of the 2022 Strasbourg conference), ed. Enrica Zanin, Teresa Nocita and Nora Viet (Geneva: Droz, 2025), pp. 263–91.
- 'Homo authenticus', in Authenticity in Medieval and Early Modern Literature, ed. Rebecca Menmuir, Studies in Medieval and Early Modern Culture (IMIP/De Gruyter, De Gruyter & Medieval Institute Publications, 2025), pp. 27–54.
- 'The Chess of Love, Text and Gloss: From Évrart de Conty to John Lydgate', in Medieval Commentary and Exegesis: Interdisciplinary Perspectives, ed. Cosima Gillhammer and Audrey Southgate (D. S. Brewer, 2026), pp. 205-24.

=== Periodical articles (since 2010) ===
- "Image Trouble in Vernacular Commentary: The Vacillations of Francesco da Barberino", in Inventing a Path: Studies in Medieval Rhetoric in Honour of Mary Carruthers, ed. Laura Iseppi de Filippis; a special issue of Nottingham Medieval Studies, 56 (2012, actually published 2013), 229-245.
- "Chaucer Drinks What He Brews: The House of Fame, 1873-82", Notes and Queries, 16 April (2014).
- "The Restoration of All Things: John Bradford's Refutation of Aquinas on Animal Resurrection", The Journal of Medieval and Early Modern Studies, 45.2 (2015), pp. 323–42.
- "Fragmentations of Medieval Religion: Thomas More, Chaucer, and the Volcano Lover", Studies in the Age of Chaucer, 37 (2015), pp. 3–27. [The 2014 Presidential Address to the New Chaucer Society]
- "Aggressive Chaucer: Of dolls, drink and Dante", The Medieval Translator, 16 (2016), 357-76. Edited by Pieter de Leemans and Michele Goyens.
- "Bending Augustine's nose. Or How to Authorize Sexual Pleasure", The Medieval Journal, 8.2 (2018), 1–20.
- 'Demonic prosthesis and the walking dead: The materiality of Chaucer's Green Yeoman', New Medieval Literatures, 22 (2022), 114–61.
- "'We only punish them when they do wrong": Slavery and the St Boswells bard, John Younger (d. 1860)', Scottish Local History, 111 (2022).
- 'John Younger (1785–1860): marked by fire and steel' (part 1), The Burns Chronicle, 131.2 (2022), 201–216.
- (with Tim William Machan), 'The Occasion of Chaucer's Boece', New Mediaeval Literatures, 23 (2023), 130–78.
- 'John Younger (1785–1860): Marked by Fire and Steel (Part 2): Writing John Younger – a life in prose', The Burns Chronicle, 132.1 (2023), 62–79.
- 'The "Voice of the Clerical Satirist": Revisiting Pearsall's Reading of The Merchant's Tale', The Chaucer Review (special issue in memory of Derek Pearsall), 58.3–4 (2023), 375–388.
- 'Scholastic Literary Theory: Intentionalism and the Desire for Stable Sense', Journal of Medieval and Early Modern Studies (special issue ed. by James Simpson), 53.3 (2023), 469–92.
- 'Proto-surgery, resurrection and race: Interpreting "The Ethiopian's leg transplant" miracle', The Mediaeval Journal, 11.1 (2021 [actually 2023]), 57–98.
