= Romance Studies (journal) =

- Discipline: Romance studies
- Language: English, French, Italian, Portuguese, Spanish
- Edited by: Lloyd Hughes Davies, Gayle Zachmann

Publication details
- History: 1982-present
- Publisher: Maney Publishing
- Frequency: Quarterly

Standard abbreviations
- ISO 4: Roman. Stud.

Indexing
- ISSN: 0263-9904 (print); 1745-8153 (web)
- LCCN: 89640078
- OCLC no.: 60625163

Links
- Journal homepage; Online access

Romance Studies is a quarterly peer-reviewed academic journal covering the study of the Romance literatures and cultures. It is published in English, French, Italian, Spanish, and Portuguese by Maney Publishing. It was established in 1982 by Valerie Minogue and Brian Nelson.

== Abstracting and indexing ==
The journal is abstracted and indexed by Annual Bibliography of English Language and Literature, Arts and Humanities Citation Index, British Humanities Index, Current Contents/Arts & Humanities, International Bibliography of Periodical Literature, MLA International Bibliography, and Scopus.

== Editors ==
The editors-in-chief are Lloyd Hughes Davies (Swansea University, 2007–present) and Gayle Zachmann (University of Florida, 2016–present). Past editors have been Elizabeth Emery (Montclair State University, 2003–2016), Susan Harrow (Bristol University, 1999–2008), Derek Gagen (1999–2007), Valerie Minogue (1982-2004), and Brian Nelson (1982–1986).
