= David Wallace (medievalist) =

British scholar of medieval literature

David Wallace is a British scholar of medieval literature and Judith Rodin Professor of English, who teaches in the USA University of Pennsylvania. After undergraduate study at the University of York, he completed a Ph.D. in 1983 at St. Edmund's College, Cambridge. From 2018 to 2019, he served a one-year term as President of the Medieval Academy of America.

In 2019, he was awarded the Sir Israel Gollancz Prize by the British Academy "for his lifetime contribution into the study of Chaucer and Medieval English literature".

He is the author and project leader of the website nationalepics.com. This website is in development alongside National Epics, a collaborative work which is to be edited by Wallace.

== Books ==
- Geoffrey Chaucer: A New Introduction (2017)
- The Cambridge Companion to Medieval Women's Writing (co-editor with Carolyn Dinshaw; 2003)
- The Cambridge History of Medieval English Literature (editor; 1999)
- Chaucerian Polity: Absolutist Lineages and Associational Forms in England and Italy (1997)
