= Sister Albertus Magnus McGrath =

Historian and church activist

Sister Albertus Magnus McGrath (1911 – 1978), born Marion Cecily McGrath, was a professor at Rosary College known for her activism for women in the church and seeking higher education.

== Education and early life ==
McGrath was born in Chicago, Illinois on January 4, 1911. Her parents, Michael George and Nora (Keane) McGrath, came to the United States from Ireland. She entered Visitation High School in 1923 when she was 12 and graduated from Rosary College in 1931. She then joined the Dominican church and took the name of Sister Albertus Magnus. She began teaching at Edgewood High School in Madison, Wisconsin where she taught multiple subjects including history, English, Latin, and mathematics. McGrath then attended the University of Wisconsin–Madison where she earned an M.A. in 1942. She began teaching at Rosary College, in the history department, in 1946 and concurrently earned a Ph.D. from the University of Wisconsin. Her subsequent studies included time at Yale University (1965 – 1966).

== Career ==
McGrath was the chair of the history department at Rosary College, now named Dominican University, where her colleagues called her Sister A.M. She was the head of the history department for 20 years.

McGrath's career was marked by activism, and she described herself as a propagandist. She lectured about women's experiences and encouraged those around her to reach their full potential. She had sometimes controversial opinions and answered questions about the oppression women face at the hands of institutionalized Catholicism. She advocated for access to education for women, especially in higher education, and was a member of the National Organization for Women. In 1972 McGrath published a book called What a Modern Catholic Believes about Women, which follows the role of women within the church beginning at the time of Christ and moving to the present day.

She died on October 8, 1978.
