= Stephanie Trigg =

Australian medieval studies academic

Stephanie Joy Trigg FAHA (born 29 March 1958) is an Australian literary scholar in the field of medieval studies, known in particular for her work on Geoffrey Chaucer. She is on the Council of the Australian Academy of the Humanities, having been elected a fellow in 2006. She is Redmond Barry Distinguished Professor of English and Former Head of the English and Theatre Programme, University of Melbourne, Australia.

== Work ==
Trigg's most important book is Congenial Souls. It applies the insights of critical cultural analysis to a field that tends to be more conventionally concerned with either literary description of Chaucer's work or depiction of his life and times. Instead, Trigg's book analyses the critical literature on Geoffrey Chaucer across the six-hundred-year period from his death in 1400 to the present, arguing that this long history of reading and writing about Chaucer is marked by a distinctive social process. Trigg argues that imagined and idealised reading communities formed around Chaucer's works, driven by the unconscious, collective desire to speak with Chaucer, and to become part of his own intimate circle of friends and other poets.

Trigg is the editor of ‘the standard edition’ of the medieval poem Wynnere and Wastoure. Research for the edition involved reconstructing the poem from the single, very corrupt copy of a badly damaged fifteenth-century manuscript. She has written on Australian poetry, including a book on the poet Gwen Harwood.

Stephanie Trigg is author of a blog called Humanities Researcher.

== Publications ==
- Affective Medievalism: Love, Abjection and Discontents, with Thomas A. Prendergast (Manchester: University of Manchester Press, 2018).
- Shame and Honor: A Vulgar History of the Order of the Garter (Philadelphia: University of Pennsylvania Press, 2012).
- Medievalism and the Gothic in Australian Culture (editor) (Turnhout: Brepols; and Melbourne: Melbourne University Publishing, 2005).
- Congenial Souls: Reading Chaucer from Medieval to Postmodern (Minneapolis and London: Minnesota University Press, 2002).
- Gwen Harwood (Melbourne: Oxford University Press, 1994).
- Medieval English Poetry (editor) (London: Longman, 1993).
- Wynnere and Wastoure (editor) (Oxford: Oxford University Press, 1990).

== Reviews of Trigg's Writing ==
- Karen Smyth, The Medieval Review, http://www.hti.umich.edu/t/tmr/ ID 03.05.14.
- J. Stephen Russell, Prolepsis: Tübingen Review of English Studies (http://www.unituebingen.de/uni/nes/prolepsis/current.html) 22 April 2002.
- David Matthews, Journal for the Study of British Cultures, vol. 9, no. 1, 2002, p. 109.
- Heather Shillinglaw, Religious Studies Review, vol. 29, no. 2, 2003, p. 187.
- Clare R. Kinney, Modern Philology, vol.101, no. 4, 2004, p. 590 (4).
- Seth Lerer, Journal of English and Germanic Philology, vol. 103, no. 4 2004, p. 544.
