= Dominican University (Illinois) =

Catholic university in River Forest, Illinois, US

- Former names: St. Clara College (1901–1922); Rosary College (1922–1997)
- Motto: Caritas et Veritas
- Motto in English: Charity and Truth
- Type: Private university
- Established: 1901; 125 years ago
- Religious affiliation: Roman Catholic (Dominican)
- Academic affiliations: ACCU
- Endowment: $51.3 million (2022)
- President: Glena Temple
- Faculty: 152 full-time, 327 part-time
- Students: 3,803 (fall 2025)
- Undergraduates: 2,642 (fall 2025)
- Postgraduates: 1,161 (fall 2025)
- Location: River Forest, Illinois, United States; 41°54′10″N 87°49′18″W
- Campus: Suburban, 30 acres (12 ha)
- Colors: (Dark and light blue)
- Nickname: Stars
- Sporting affiliations: NCAA Division III – NACC
- Website: dom.edu
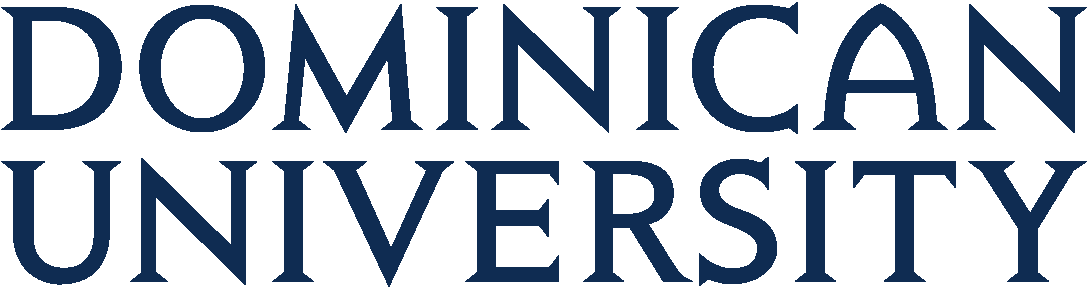

Dominican University (DU) is a private Catholic university in River Forest, Illinois, United States. Affiliated with the Sinsinawa Dominican Sisters, it offers bachelor's and master's degrees, certificate programs, and four doctoral programs, including PhDs in Information Studies and Applied Social Justice, an EdD in Educational Leadership, and a Doctor of Nursing in Psychiatric Mental Health Nursing Practitioner. Dominican University has more than 50 majors in the Rosary College of Arts and Sciences and 20 programs in five graduate academic divisions. From 1922 to 1997, the institution was named Rosary College.

== History ==
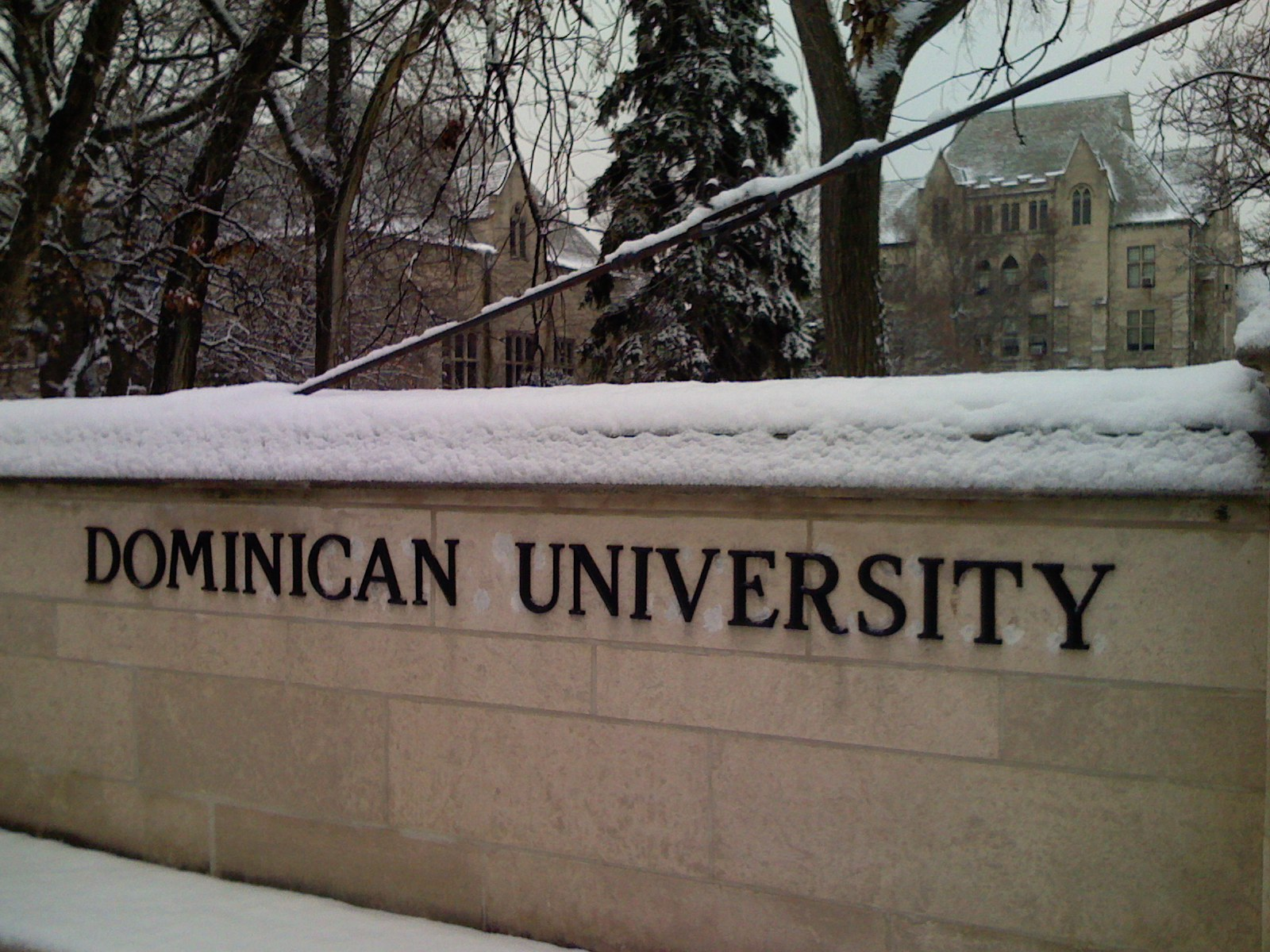
Entrance gate to Dominican University

The institution began as St. Clara Female Academy in 1848, chartered by Dominican priest Samuel Charles Mazzuchelli in Sinsinawa, Wisconsin. It became a college in 1901 and moved to River Forest, Illinois, taking the name Rosary College in 1922 while under the leadership of Samuel Coughlin, a nun of the Sinsinawa Dominican Sisters. Trinity High School was founded as the preparatory department of the college before moving to its own campus nearby in 1926 and is still run by the order. The present name of Dominican University was adopted in 1997 as part of a strategic plan by president Donna Carroll to reflect the school's Dominican heritage and its status as a more comprehensive university.

The institution became coeducational in 1970.

Dominican University shares a tie to Rodgers and Hammerstein's The Sound of Music. Gregory Duffy advised the playwrights to form the Catholic nun background of the lead character, Maria.

== Accreditation ==
The university is accredited by the Higher Learning Commission to grant baccalaureate and master's degrees. Specific programs and units are accredit by other accreditors, including the American Library Association, Association to Advance Collegiate Schools of Business, Commission on Accreditation of the Council on Social Work Education, National Council for Teacher Education, Accreditation Review Commission for the Physician Assistant, Inc, Accreditation Council for Education in Nutrition and Dietetics, and Commission on Collegiate Nursing Education.

== Academics ==
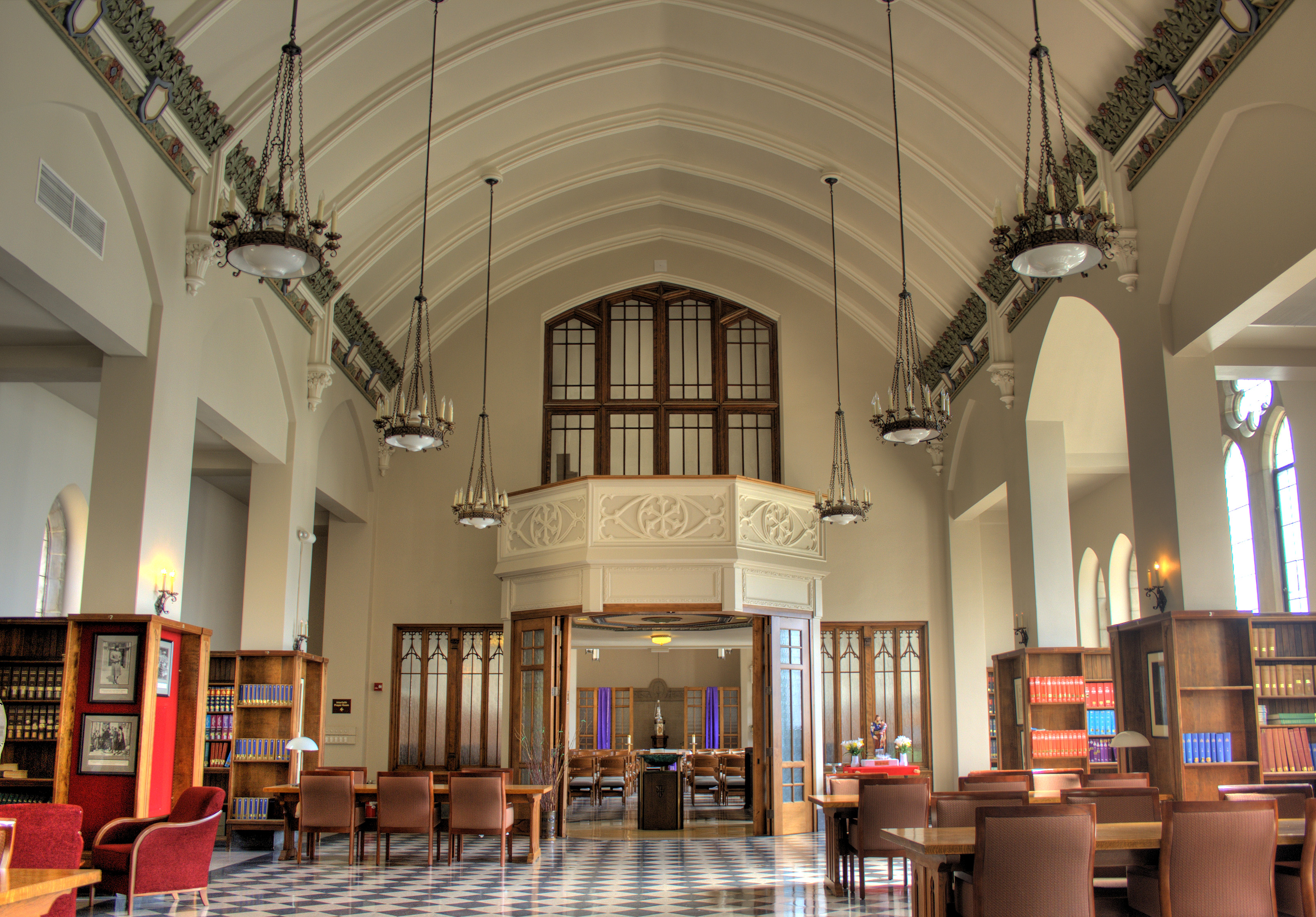
View of the Noonan Reading Room and Rosary Chapel

Dominican University offers more than 40 undergraduate majors, and several pre-professional programs. The student to faculty ratio is 11:1 at this university. Dominican's graduate school is divided into three academic divisions: the Rosary College of Arts, Education and Sciences, the Borra College of Health Sciences, and the College of Business, Information Studies and Technology.

Dominican University's School of Information Studies offers the Master of Library and Information Science and Master of Professional Studies in Library and Information Science. The university also offers the Doctor of Philosophy in Library and Information Science. The SOIS publishes a semiannual, peer-reviewed online journal called World Libraries, a publication dedicated to "librarians and libraries in regions without associations or agencies to encourage scholarly communication and professional development". The publication of World Libraries is coordinated by students studying internet publishing. The school also administers the Butler Children's Literature Center for the study of children's and young-adult literature.

In the fall of 2014, the university introduced a new Bachelor of Science in nursing degree program. A new clinical simulation laboratory was designed and built specifically for the program.

== Main campus ==
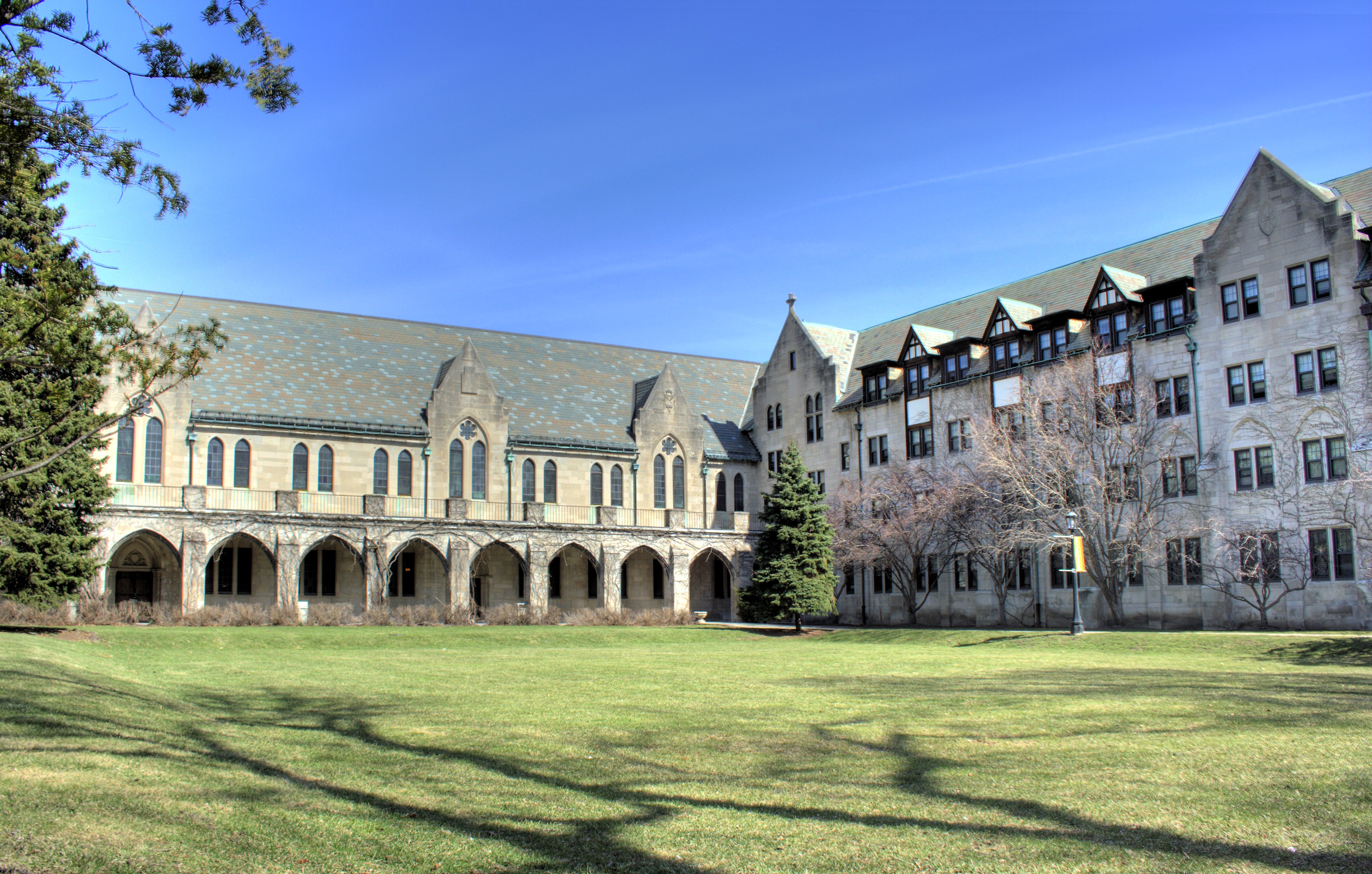
View of the Dominican University quad

Dominican University is located on a 30-acre (12.14 ha) wooded campus in suburban River Forest, 10 miles (16 km) from downtown Chicago. Other campus features include a language learning center, a computer technology center, an art gallery, a chapel, a student center, the Lund Auditorium, the Eloise Martin Recital Hall, and the Stepan Bookstore. The five residence halls at Dominican University are: Aquinas Hall (Priory Campus), Coughlin Hall, Sister Jean Murray Hall, Mazzuchelli Hall, and Power Hall. More than 30% of all undergraduates live on campus. Most incoming first-year students live in double rooms in Murray or Coughlin halls. Murray is the newest residence hall, which opened in 2004 (as Centennial Hall; renamed after former college president Sister Jean Murray in 2012).

== Priory campus ==
On acreage purchased in October 1925, the St. Thomas Aquinas Priory was built and modeled to look like the castle of the family of St. Thomas Aquinas. It was completed in 1926 on a large tract of land at the northwest corner of Harlem Avenue & Division Street and housed The Dominican House of Studies, a college of philosophy for neophytes of the Catholic Dominican Order. 150 young men from around the country intent on entering the priesthood lived and studied on the campus. Taught by a faculty of twenty, the young men completed three years of study at the college and, upon graduation, would head to Washington D.C., to complete their studies for the priesthood. In 1964, a new wing was opened, but shortly after the addition was completed, attendance began to diminish and financial problems began to trouble the college. In 1970, after forty-three years of service, the college closed.

In the years that followed, the Province of St. Albert the Great (which counts Fenwick High School and St. Vincent Ferrer Parish among its many ministries) operated the Priory and it continued to be home to generations of Dominicans Friars. In early 2012, the Province announced that the Priory would be vacated as part of an assessment of all its Chicago-area properties. The building (and some of the land surrounding it) had been sold to Dominican University over a decade earlier and Dominican Friars had remained on site through a favorable lease agreement with the university.

By June 2012, the remaining friars had relocated, and Dominican renovated the building to house undergraduate and graduate students. The campus also housed the School of Social Work, the Siena Center, and the Goedert Center for early childhood education.

Discussion of the potential sale of Priory Campus begun as early as 2018, with talks escalating during the COVID-19 pandemic, which resulted in the campus being underutilized. In 2021, Fenwick High School purchased the campus. The preschool that was part of the Goedert Center closed after the university withdrew support for it, blindsiding parents and staff.

== Student life ==
Dominican has a variety of campus organizations for students. They include cultural groups, department clubs, honor societies, and special-interest groups.

== Athletics ==
The Dominican athletic teams are called the Stars. The university is a member of the Division III level of the National Collegiate Athletic Association (NCAA), primarily competing in the Northern Athletics Collegiate Conference (NACC; formerly known as the Northern Athletics Conference (NAC) until after the 2012–13 school year) since the 2006–07 academic year. The Stars previously competed in the D-III Lake Michigan Conference only for the 2005–06 school year; in the D-III Northern Illinois-Iowa Conference (NIIC) from 1999–2000 to 2004–05; and in the Chicagoland Collegiate Athletic Conference (CCAC) of the National Association of Intercollegiate Athletics (NAIA) from 1980–81 to 1998–99.

Dominican competes in 13 intercollegiate varsity sports: Men's sports include baseball, basketball, cross country, golf, soccer and volleyball; while women's sports include basketball, bowling, cross country, soccer, softball, stunt and volleyball.

== Notable alumni and faculty ==
- Mary Clemente Davlin (1929–2017), Dominican Sister, advocate for diversity in higher education, and a noted scholar of medieval studies. She was both an alumna and a professor, and won the university's highest awards.
- Sister Albertus Magnus McGrath (1911 – 1978), advocate for women, history department chair
- George Anastaplo (1925 - 2014), professor of political science and department chair
- Pauline Atherton Cochrane (1929-2024) American librarian and one of the most highly cited authors in the field of library and information sciences.
- Maureen Daly (1921-2006), journalist and novelist, whose 1942 novel Seventeenth Summer, completed while she was a Rosary College student, has been described as the first young adult novel.
