= Exemplaria =

- Discipline: Middle Ages and Early Modern Period
- Language: English
- Edited by: Carissa Harris, Shirin Khanmohamadi, Charles Samuelson, Joseph Taylor.

Publication details
- History: 1989-present
- Publisher: Taylor & Francis
- Frequency: Quarterly

Standard abbreviations
- ISO 4: Exemplaria

Indexing
- ISSN: 1041-2573 (print); 1753-3074 (web)
- LCCN: 90649992
- OCLC no.: 716182556

Links
- Journal homepage; Online access

Exemplaria is a quarterly peer-reviewed academic journal covering the Middle Ages and the Early modern period. It was established in 1989 and is published by Taylor & Francis. The editors-in-chief are Carissa M. Harris (Temple University), Shirin A. Khanmohamadi (San Francisco State University), Charles Samuelson (University of Colorado Boulder), and Joseph Taylor (University of Alabama in Huntsville). The book review editor is Hall Bjørnstad (Indiana University, Bloomington).

== History ==
The journal was developed in the late 1980s by Richard Allen Shoaf of the University of Florida and Julian N. Wasserman of Loyola University, New Orleans, with the help of the publisher Mario Di Cesare of SUNY Binghamton, who founded Medieval and Renaissance Texts and Studies (MRTS). As Shoaf has said, they "envisioned the journal as a venue in which pre-modern literature and newer theories, such as deconstruction, psychoanalysis, and feminism, could challenge each other in ongoing dialogue and arguments for the vitality and relevance of the pre-modern."

The journal was published by MRTS twice a year from 1989 to 2006. In 2007, it became a quarterly published by Maney Publishing, with Shoaf as the principal editor. In 2009, it was handed over to a new team of five editors. In 2015, Maney Publishing was acquired by Taylor and Francis, which continues to publish Exemplaria.

== Reception ==
In 2006 The Times Literary Supplement stated that Exemplaria "breaks into new territory, while never compromising on scholarly quality". In 2011 Exemplaria received the Phoenix Award for Significant Editorial Achievement from the Council of Editors of Learned Journals (CELJ).

== Abstracting and indexing ==
The journal is abstracted and indexed in:

- Annual Bibliography of English Language and Literature
- Arts and Humanities Citation Index
- British Humanities Index
- Current Contents/Arts & Humanities
- EBSCO databases
- Modern Language Association Bibliographies
- Scopus
