= Wauwatosa, Wisconsin =

- City
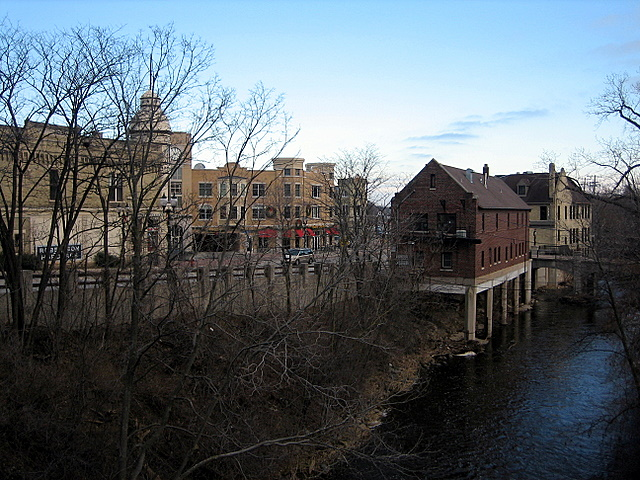
- Downtown Wauwatosa along the Menomonee River

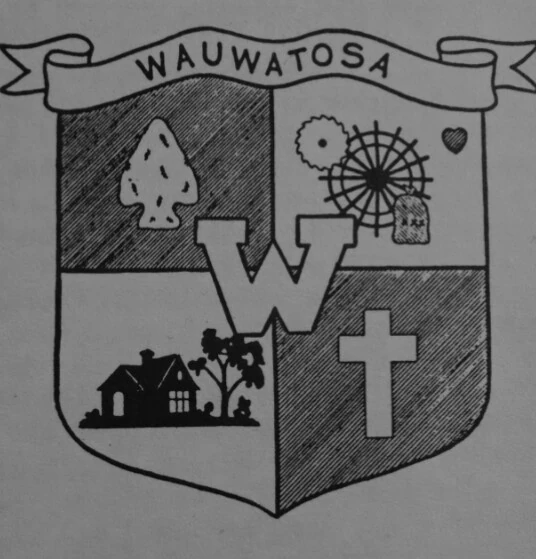
- Flag
- Nickname: Tosa
- Interactive map of Wauwatosa, Wisconsin
- Location within Wisconsin Location within the United States
- Coordinates: 43°4′N 88°2′W
- Country: United States
- State: Wisconsin
- County: Milwaukee
- Incorporated: May 27, 1897; 129 years ago

Government
  - Mayor: Dennis McBride
  - Congressional Rep.: Gwen Moore (D)

Area
  - City: 13.23 sq mi (34.27 km^{2})
  - Land: 13.23 sq mi (34.26 km^{2})
  - Water: 0.0039 sq mi (0.01 km^{2})
- Elevation: 673 ft (205 m)

Population (2020)
  - City: 48,387
  - Density: 3,637.7/sq mi (1,404.54/km^{2})
  - Metro: 1,753,355 (Milwaukee)
- Time zone: UTC−6 (Central)
  - Summer (DST): UTC−5 (CDT)
- Area code: 414
- FIPS code: 55-84675
- GNIS feature ID: 1576335
- Website: www.wauwatosa.net

Wauwatosa (/ˌwɔːwəˈtoʊsə/ WAW-wə-TOH-sə; colloquially Tosa) is a city in Milwaukee County, Wisconsin, United States. The population was 48,387 at the 2020 census. Wauwatosa is a suburb located immediately west of Milwaukee and is part of the Milwaukee metropolitan area. It is named after the Potawatomi Chief Wauwataesie and the Potawatomi word for firefly.

== History ==
The lush Menomonee Valley of the Wauwatosa area provided a key overland gateway between the rich glacial farmland of southeastern Wisconsin and the Port of Milwaukee. In 1835, Charles Hart became the first Euro-American to settle here, followed that year by 17 other families. The following year a United States Road was built from Milwaukee through Wauwatosa, eventually reaching Madison. Charles Hart built a mill in 1845 on the Menomonee River which gave the settlement its original name of "Hart's Mill." The mill was torn down in 1914.

The Town of Wau-wau-too-sa was created by act of the Wisconsin Territorial Legislature on April 30, 1840. As of the 1840 census, the population of the Town of Wau-wau-too-sa or Wauwatosa was 342. The town government was organized in 1842. The town's borders originally extended from the present-day Greenfield Avenue in the south to Hampton Avenue in the north, and from 27th Street in the east to the Waukesha County line in the west, encompassing sections of present-day Milwaukee, West Milwaukee and West Allis, plus the southern part of former North Milwaukee, which was wholly annexed into the city of Milwaukee in 1927. Most of the town was farmland through the remainder of the 19th century.

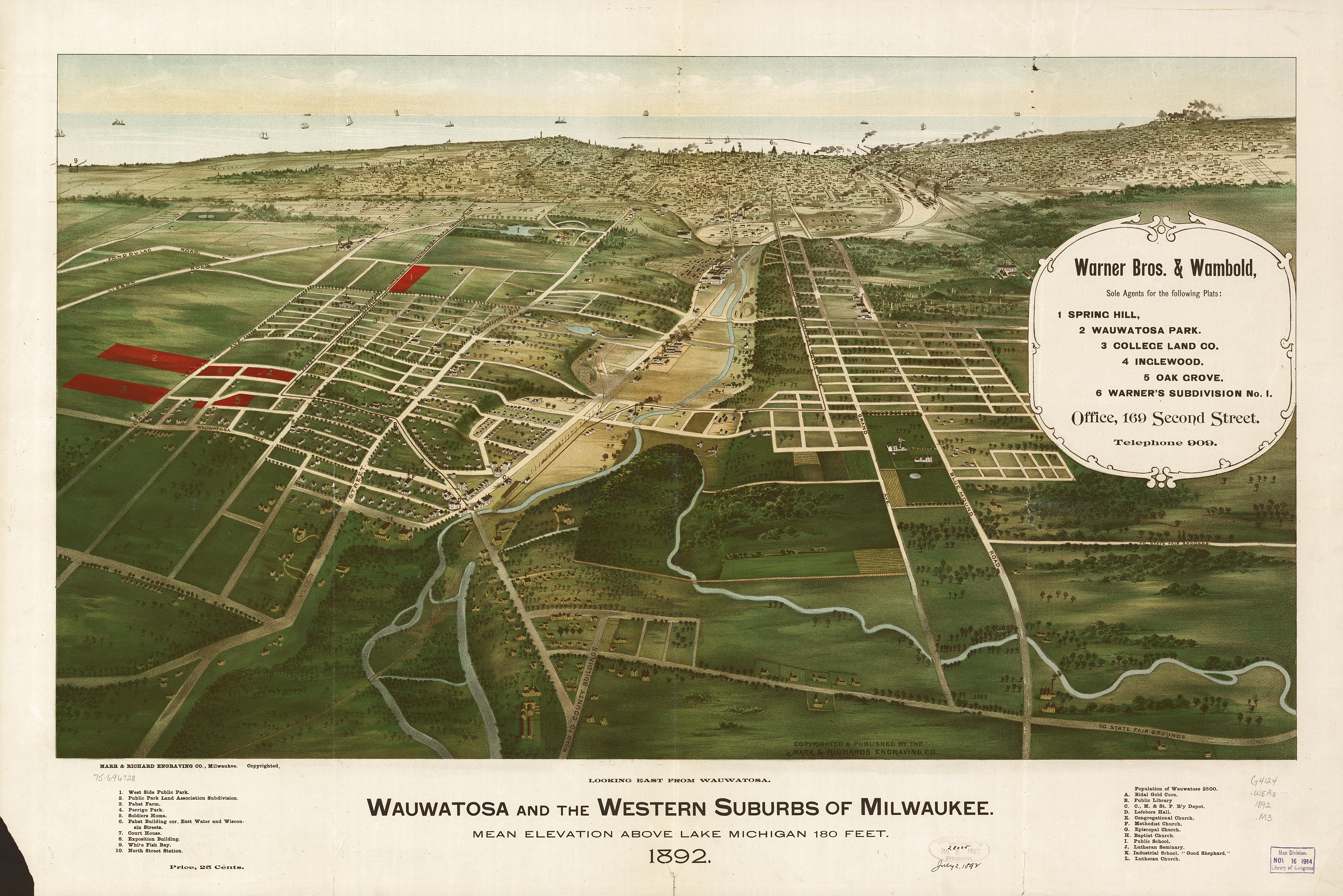
Wauwatosa in 1892

In 1849, the Watertown Plank Road was constructed through Wauwatosa, mainly following the old Madison territorial road. In 1851 Wisconsin's first railroad (later The Milwaukee Road) established Wauwatosa as its western terminus. The Village of Wauwatosa was incorporated from the central part of the Town of Wauwatosa in 1892, and was rechartered as the City of Wauwatosa on May 27, 1897.

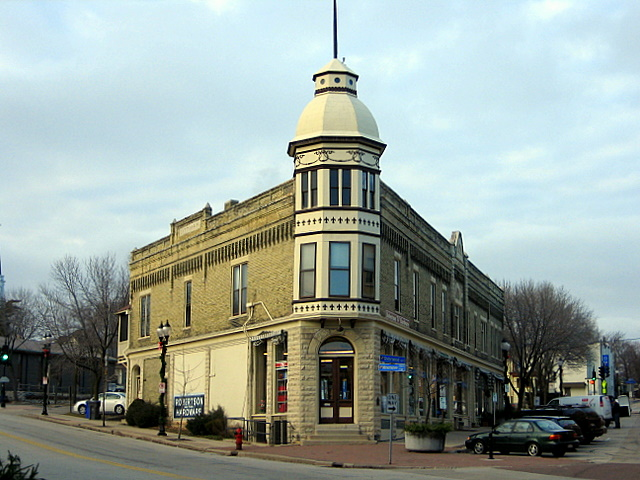
Robertson Ace Hardware Building; one of the original buildings in Wauwatosa

On November 25, 1952, Wauwatosa more than doubled its size by annexing 8.5 square miles (22 square kilometers) of land west of the Menomonee River, the entire remaining portion of the Town of Wauwatosa, which became the home to several large cold storage and regional food distribution terminals. Industrial plants owned by firms including Harley-Davidson and Briggs & Stratton were also constructed. Wauwatosa became an edge city with an important commercial and retail district built up along Milwaukee's beltline Highway 100 and anchored by the Mayfair Mall.

In 1992, Wauwatosa received some national attention when the Wauwatosa Common Council, threatened with a lawsuit, decided to remove a Christian cross from the city's seal that had been adopted in 1957. The seal itself had originally been designed by 9-year old Suzanne Vallier as an entry in a contest among Wauwatosa schoolchildren. The quadrants of the logo's shield represented, from top left going clockwise: an arrowhead representing the Indians who were the original inhabitants of the city; the mill representing Hart's Mill which was the original name of the city; the cross representing the "city of churches"; and the symbol used on street signs representing the "city of homes". The cross was replaced with the text "In God We Trust".

On February 2, 2020, Alvin Cole, a 17-year-old African-American male, was shot and killed at Mayfair Mall by a police officer responding to a reported disturbance. According to authorities, Cole had been fleeing from police while carrying a stolen handgun. No charges were filed against the officer who fired the fatal shots, sparking protests. On November 20, a shooting occurred at the mall, leaving eight people injured. The shooter fled the scene afterwards and remained at large for a day, until the arrest of a 15-year-old suspect.

The city's downtown was significantly affected by widespread flash flooding on August 9–10, 2025.

== Geography ==
According to the United States Census Bureau, the city has a total area of 13.25 square miles (34.32 km^{2}), all land.

Eastern Wauwatosa is also known for its homes and residential streets, at one time just a short streetcar ride away from downtown Milwaukee. Prior to the arrival of Dutch elm disease, many of Wauwatosa's older residential streets had large gothic colonnades of American elm trees. In Wauwatosa, the Menomonee Valley made it easier to quarry portions of the Niagara Escarpment, which provided the necessary materials for cream-colored bricks and limestone foundations used in many homes and public buildings throughout the region.

=== Climate ===
Climate data for Wauwatosa, Wisconsin (Mount Mary University) 1991–2020 normals, extremes 1946–present
Month	Jan	Feb	Mar	Apr	May	Jun	Jul	Aug	Sep	Oct	Nov	Dec	Year
Record high °F (°C)	60 (16)	71 (22)	86 (30)	90 (32)	95 (35)	104 (40)	108 (42)	108 (42)	100 (38)	90 (32)	78 (26)	68 (20)	108 (42)
Mean daily maximum °F (°C)	29.7 (−1.3)	33.6 (0.9)	44.3 (6.8)	56.0 (13.3)	67.5 (19.7)	77.9 (25.5)	82.8 (28.2)	80.7 (27.1)	73.8 (23.2)	60.9 (16.1)	46.8 (8.2)	35.2 (1.8)	57.4 (14.1)
Daily mean °F (°C)	21.9 (−5.6)	25.1 (−3.8)	35.1 (1.7)	46.1 (7.8)	57.5 (14.2)	67.9 (19.9)	73.1 (22.8)	71.2 (21.8)	63.6 (17.6)	51.2 (10.7)	38.5 (3.6)	27.9 (−2.3)	48.3 (9.1)
Mean daily minimum °F (°C)	14.1 (−9.9)	16.7 (−8.5)	25.9 (−3.4)	36.3 (2.4)	47.5 (8.6)	57.9 (14.4)	63.3 (17.4)	61.7 (16.5)	53.3 (11.8)	41.6 (5.3)	30.1 (−1.1)	20.6 (−6.3)	39.1 (3.9)
Record low °F (°C)	−27 (−33)	−25 (−32)	−15 (−26)	11 (−12)	20 (−7)	32 (0)	40 (4)	41 (5)	27 (−3)	16 (−9)	−8 (−22)	−22 (−30)	−27 (−33)
Average precipitation inches (mm)	1.48 (38)	1.49 (38)	1.79 (45)	3.71 (94)	3.73 (95)	4.84 (123)	3.57 (91)	3.68 (93)	3.02 (77)	2.73 (69)	2.05 (52)	1.73 (44)	33.82 (859)
Average snowfall inches (cm)	11.0 (28)	9.9 (25)	5.3 (13)	1.5 (3.8)	0.0 (0.0)	0.0 (0.0)	0.0 (0.0)	0.0 (0.0)	0.0 (0.0)	0.0 (0.0)	2.0 (5.1)	9.8 (25)	39.5 (100)
Average precipitation days (≥ 0.01 in)	10.1	8.6	8.9	11.7	13.0	10.9	9.6	9.5	8.5	10.6	9.1	9.9	120.4
Average snowy days (≥ 0.1 in)	7.3	6.2	3.4	0.9	0.0	0.0	0.0	0.0	0.0	0.0	1.3	5.6	24.7
Source: NOAA

== Demographics ==
Historical population
Census	Pop.	Note	%±
1900	2,842		—
1910	3,346		17.7%
1920	5,818		73.9%
1930	21,194		264.3%
1940	27,769		31.0%
1950	33,324		20.0%
1960	56,923		70.8%
1970	58,676		3.1%
1980	51,310		−12.6%
1990	49,484		−3.6%
2000	47,271		−4.5%
2010	46,396		−1.9%
2020	48,387		4.3%
Note: Town of Wauwatosa annexed by City of Wauwatosa in 1952–54.

=== 2020 census ===
As of the 2020 census, Wauwatosa had a population of 48,387. The median age was 37.7 years. 20.7% of residents were under the age of 18 and 17.3% of residents were 65 years of age or older. For every 100 females there were 90.6 males, and for every 100 females age 18 and over there were 86.9 males age 18 and over.

100.0% of residents lived in urban areas, while 0.0% lived in rural areas.

There were 21,822 households in Wauwatosa, of which 25.9% had children under the age of 18 living in them. Of all households, 45.3% were married-couple households, 17.8% were households with a male householder and no spouse or partner present, and 30.0% were households with a female householder and no spouse or partner present. About 35.4% of all households were made up of individuals and 13.8% had someone living alone who was 65 years of age or older.

There were 23,148 housing units, of which 5.7% were vacant. The homeowner vacancy rate was 0.7% and the rental vacancy rate was 6.7%.

Racial composition as of the 2020 census
Race	Number	Percent
White	40,040	82.7%
Black or African American	2,911	6.0%
American Indian and Alaska Native	117	0.2%
Asian	1,679	3.5%
Native Hawaiian and Other Pacific Islander	20	0.0%
Some other race	545	1.1%
Two or more races	3,075	6.4%
Hispanic or Latino (of any race)	2,219	4.6%

=== 2010 census ===
As of the census of 2010, there were 46,396 people, 20,435 households, and 11,969 families residing in the city. The population density was 3,501.6 inhabitants per square mile (1,352.0/km^{2}). There were 21,520 housing units at an average density of 1,624.2 per square mile (627.1/km^{2}). The racial makeup of the city was 89.6% White, 4.5% African American, 0.3% Native American, 2.8% Asian, 0.1% Pacific Islander, 0.6% from other races, and 2.2% from two or more races. Hispanic or Latino of any race were 3.1% of the population.

There were 20,435 households, of which 27.6% had children under the age of 18 living with them, 47.2% were married couples living together, 8.2% had a female householder with no husband present, 3.2% had a male householder with no wife present, and 41.4% were non-families. 34.3% of all households were made up of individuals, and 14.5% had someone living alone who was 65 years of age or older. The average household size was 2.23 and the average family size was 2.92.

The median age in the city was 39.8 years. 21.9% of residents were under the age of 18; 5.8% were between the ages of 18 and 24; 28.9% were from 25 to 44; 26.7% were from 45 to 64; and 16.6% were 65 years of age or older. The gender makeup of the city was 46.6% male and 53.4% female.

=== 2000 census ===
As of 2000 the median income for a household in the city was $54,519, and the median income for a family was $68,030. Males had a median income of $46,721 versus $35,289 for females. The per capita income for the city was $28,834. About 2.3% of families and 3.8% of the population were below the poverty line, including 3.9% of those under age 18 and 5.5% of those age 65 or over.

== Points of interest ==
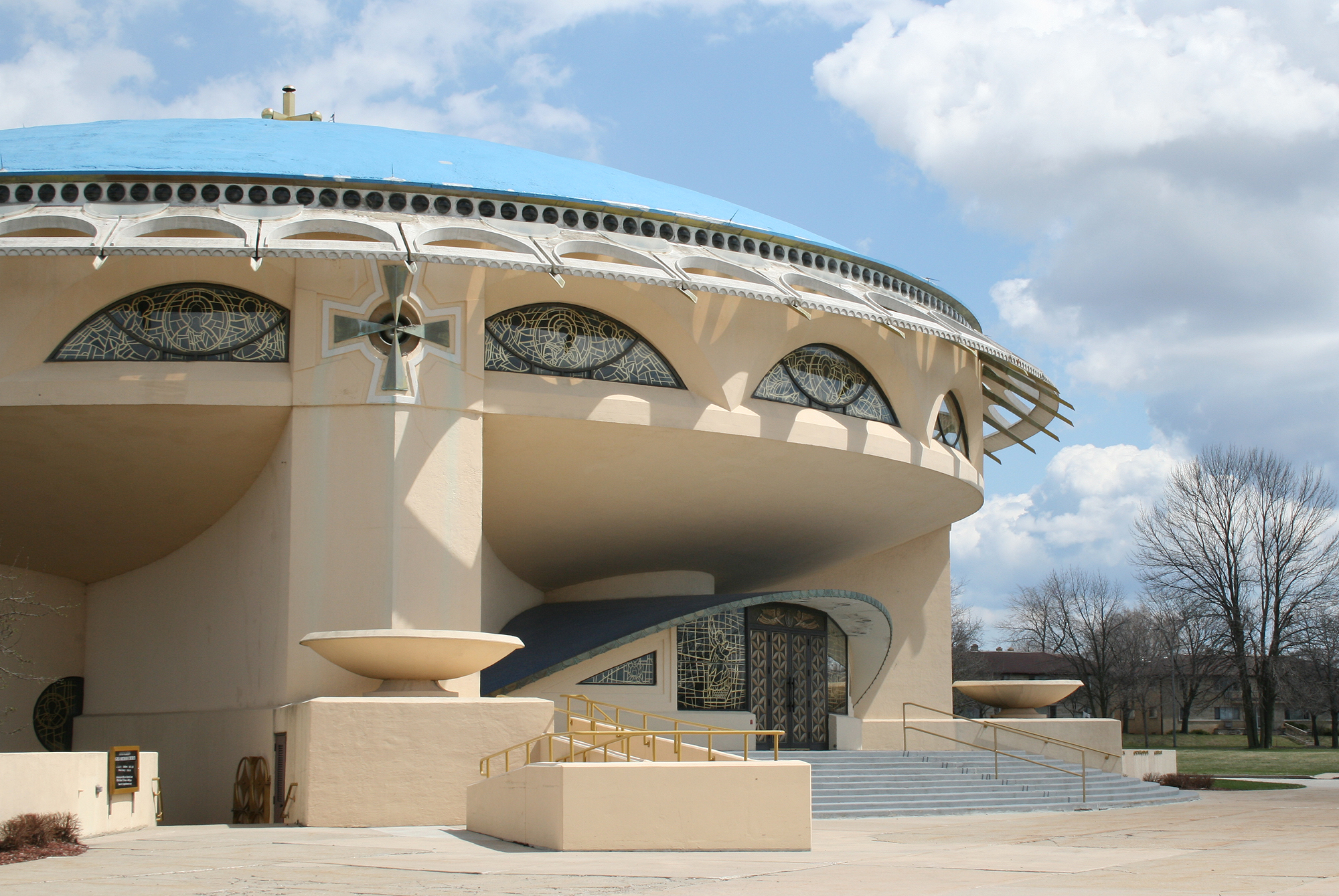
Annunciation Greek Orthodox Church, designed by Frank Lloyd Wright

Wauwatosa contains Milwaukee County's Regional Medical Center, which includes the Medical College of Wisconsin, the Children's Hospital of Wisconsin, and Froedtert Hospital, one of two level-one trauma centers in the state. Other points of interest are the Annunciation Greek Orthodox Church designed by Frank Lloyd Wright; and the Memorial Center, built in 1957, which contains the public library, an auditorium, and the city hall. The Washington Highlands Historic District, a residential neighborhood designed in 1916 by renowned city planner Werner Hegemann, was added to the National Register of Historic Places in 1989, as was the Kneeland-Walker House. The Milwaukee County School of Agriculture and Domestic Economy Historic District, located on a former high school campus, was added in 1998. Other buildings on the list include Wauwatosa's oldest house, the Lowell Damon House; the Thomas B. Hart House; and the Wauwatosa Woman's Club Clubhouse.

In July 2019, the Tourism Commission of Wauwatosa sponsored the installation of several new murals by professional artists. The murals are curated by Milwaukee-based public arts agency Wallpapered City, and the artworks appear on buildings from 64th Street to 70th Street along North Avenue.'

== Government and politics ==
Wauwatosa has a mayor–council government. The mayor is elected to a four-year term. The Common Council is composed of 12 alderpersons, one from each of 12 single-member districts. They serve four-year terms, with half of the Council up for election every other year. Effective April 2026, the alderpersons are subject to term limits and are restricted to no more than two consecutive four-year terms. The alderpersons set policy and have extensive financial control, but are not engaged in daily operational management.

The mayor's annual salary is $30,000 per year. In addition, the mayor is eligible to receive health, dental, and vision insurance, group term life insurance, and may participate in the Wisconsin Retirement System pension. Alderpersons are paid $7,050 annually and are only eligible for group term life insurance.

Wauwatosa is mostly in the Wisconsin's 4th congressional district for the United States House of Representatives, with small parts of northern Wauwatosa in Wisconsin's 5th congressional district. Wauwatosa voters have supported Democratic, Republican, and Libertarian candidates.

Year	Election	Democratic			Republican			Others		Total	Plurality
Year	Election	Candidate	Votes	Pct.	Candidate	Votes	Pct.	Votes	Pct.	Total	Plurality
2024	U.S. President	Kamala Harris	22,136	68.99%	Donald Trump	9,312	29.02%	637	1.99%	32,085	12,824
2024	U.S. Senate	Tammy Baldwin	21,848	68.51%	Eric Hovde	9,580	30.04%	463	1.45%	31,891	12,268
2022	Governor	Tony Evers	18,544	69.80%	Tim Michels	7,838	29.50%	184	0.7%	26,566	10,706
2022	U.S. Senate	Mandela Barnes	18,099	68.11%	Ron Johnson	8,406	31.63%	68	0.26%	26,573	9,693
2020	U.S. President	Joe Biden	20,880	66.03%	Donald Trump	10,104	31.95%	636	2.01%	31,620	10,776
2018	Governor	Tony Evers	15,705	57.26%	Scott Walker	11,276	41.11%	448	1.63%	27,429	4,429
2018	U.S. Senator	Tammy Baldwin	17,126	62.63%	Leah Vukmir	10,162	37.16%	57	0.21%	27,345	6,964
2016	U.S. President	Hillary Clinton	16,316	56.87%	Donald Trump	10,034	34.98%	2,250	7.87%	28,600	6,282
2016	U.S. Senator	Russ Feingold	15,038	52.31%	Ron Johnson	13,147	45.73%	563	1.96%	28,748	1,891
2014	Governor	Mary Burke	11,713	47.16%	Scott Walker	12,875	51.83%	252	1.01%	24,840	1,162
2012	U.S. President	Barack Obama	15,220	50.61%	Mitt Romney	14,511	48.25%	344	1.14%	30,075	709
2012	U.S. Senate	Tammy Baldwin	14,516	49.00%	Tommy Thompson	14,588	49.24%	522	1.76%	29,626	72
2012	Governor (recall)	Tom Barrett	12,033	45.90%	Scott Walker	14,059	53.63%	125	0.47%	26,217	2,026
2010	Governor	Tom Barrett	11,541	47.56%	Scott Walker	12,579	51.84%	144	0.06%	24,264	1,038

== Education ==
Wauwatosa is served by the Wauwatosa School District, which includes nine elementary schools, two middle schools, and two secondary schools: Wauwatosa East High School and Wauwatosa West High School. Additional school district services are provided to juvenile residents of the Milwaukee County Grounds at Children's Hospital of Wisconsin and the Milwaukee County's Children and Adolescent Services Center through the River Hills School on the Milwaukee County Mental Health Complex grounds. County juveniles in secure detention receive educational services through the Vel R. Phillips Juvenile Justice Center School within the Milwaukee County Children's Court building. Several private Catholic and Lutheran elementary schools also operate in the city.

Bryant & Stratton College operates a Wauwatosa campus. Milwaukee Career College is located in Wauwatosa.

== Transportation ==
Wauwatosa is served by Milwaukee County Transit System and Waukesha Metro Transit. Interstate 41 runs on the west side of the city.

The westernmost portion of the Hank Aaron State Trail runs through the city.

The Canadian Pacific Kansas City (Milwaukee Road) Main line from Chicago to Miles City, which previously extended to Washington, runs through Wauwatosa. The line had commuter service between Milwaukee and Watertown until 1972.

== In popular culture ==
Wauwatosa is the home town of the narrator of an unrecorded song by Bob Dylan, "On, Wisconsin" (not to be confused with the University of Wisconsin fight song of the same name). The lyrics were written by Dylan in 1961, but the song remained unfinished until 2018, when local musician Trapper Schoepp wrote music to accompany Dylan's lyrics. Schoepp recorded the song at Wauwatosa's Wire & Vice studio for his album Primetime Illusion (2019).

== Notable people ==
- Matt Adamczyk, American businessman and politician
- Antler, poet
- Carole Barrowman, author and professor
- William Bast, screenwriter
- Henry S. Berninger, Wisconsin politician and businessman
- Bill Berry, musician
- Rebecca Bradley, Justice of the Wisconsin Supreme Court
- Fabian Bruskewitz, Bishop of the Roman Catholic Diocese of Lincoln
- Milton F. Burmaster, Wisconsin politician and lawyer
- Matthew Busche, cyclist
- Glenn R. Davis, U.S. Representative
- Fisk Holbrook Day, physician and geologist
- Nancy Dickerson, Peabody Award-winning journalist
- Sarah E. Dickson, first woman elected Presbyterian elder
- Jim Drake, American film and television director
- Anton Falch, professional baseball player
- Charles Fingado, Wisconsin politician
- Charles Thompson Fisher, Wisconsin politician and farmer
- James L. Foley Jr., Wisconsin politician and farmer
- Albert Fowler, mayor of Rockford, Illinois
- Eric E. Hagedorn, Wisconsin politician and electrical engineer
- Devin Harris, professional basketball player of the NBA
- Judson G. Hart, Wisconsin farmer and politician
- Stephen F. Hayes, author and political commentator
- Julius P. Heil, Wisconsin governor
- Michael W. Hoover, presiding judge of the Wisconsin Court of Appeals
- Dorothy Hosmer, photographer and travel writer
- Mike Huwiler, Olympic athlete, MLS player
- John K. Iglehart, founding editor of Health Affairs and national correspondent of the New England Journal of Medicine
- Caroline Iverson Ackerman, American aviator, journalist, reporter, and educator
- Michael G. Kirby, Wisconsin politician
- Greg Koch, guitarist
- Christian A. Koenitzer, Wisconsin politician
- Mike Krol, musician
- Edwin N. Lightfoot, American chemical engineer and professor
- Joseph H. Loveland, Vermont politician
- William Martz, chess International Master
- Joseph McBride, author, film historian
- Ed McCully, Christian missionary killed during Operation Auca
- John Morgridge, former CEO and chairman of the board of Cisco Systems
- Walter Nortman, Wisconsin politician
- Nancy Olson, American actress
- Charles B. Perry, Wisconsin politician
- Roger Ream, educator
- John E. Reilly Jr., Wisconsin politician and judge
- Peggy Rosenzweig, Wisconsin politician
- Brad Rowe, actor
- Pat Ryan, Insurance businessman
- Jeremy Scahill. investigative journalist, author, and director
- Richard Schickel, film critic and author
- William A. Schroeder, Wisconsin politician and lawyer
- Arthur "Buddy" Schumacher, murder victim
- Nevin S. Scrimshaw, American food scientist and professor
- Steve Sisolak, Governor of Nevada
- Tony Smith, retired NBA player
- Jerry Smith, professional basketball player
- Robert R. Spitzer, American agricultural researcher and President of the Milwaukee School of Engineering
- Andrew Stadler, professional soccer player
- Thomas A. Steitz, Nobel Prize-winning chemist
- Lou Sullivan, transgender rights activist and historian
- Michael Torke, composer and musician
- Spencer Tracy, Hollywood actor
- Frederick D. Underwood, president of the Erie Railroad
- Scott Walker, 45th Governor of Wisconsin
- Grace Weber, singer and songwriter
- Richard S. Wheeler, American writer and newspaper editor
- David J. Wineland, Nobel Prize-winning physicist
- George Wylie, Wisconsin farmer and politician

== See also ==
- Morris Pratt Institute - Educational institution located in the city
