= Eric E. Hagedorn =

American politician and engineer (1896–1963)

Eric Hagedorn

Member of the Wisconsin State Assembly from the Milwaukee 20th district
- In office January 8, 1941 – January 13, 1943
- Preceded by: Walter Nortman
- Succeeded by: Milton F. Burmaster

Personal details
- Born: August 21, 1896 Milwaukee, Wisconsin
- Died: June 22, 1963 (aged 66) Park Falls, Wisconsin
- Cause of death: Cancer
- Resting place: Two Lakes Cemetery; Phillips, Wisconsin
- Party: Republican
- Education: Milwaukee School of Engineering

Military service
- Branch/service: United States Navy

Eric E. Hagedorn (August 21, 1896 – June 22, 1963) was an American politician and electrical engineer who served one term as a member of the Wisconsin State Assembly. A Republican, he represented the city and town of Wauwatosa, Wisconsin, and northwestern Milwaukee County.

== Early life and education ==
Born in Milwaukee, Wisconsin, Hagedorn graduated from Milwaukee Lutheran High School in 1912. He attended the Milwaukee School of Engineering from 1913 to 1915, and took a correspondence course in law.

== Career ==
He served in the United States Navy and was commander of the 8th battalion at Great Lakes Naval Station for two and a half years. Outside the Navy, he worked as an electrical engineer, working as superintendent of the Jung Electric Company, a sales manager for the Electrical Equipment Company, and manager and secretary of the Airforce Corporation.

He was elected Town Council President for the Town of Wauwatosa, and, in 1940, chose to challenge incumbent Republican Assemblyman Walter Nortman in the Republican primary. Hagedorn won a stunning upset in the primary, but the Milwaukee County Republican Party disavowed the results, stating that Hagedorn was not a "bona fide Republican." The County Party endorsed Nortman, who ran in the general election as an Independent Republican. Hagedorn won the general election anyway, taking 47% of the vote in a four-candidate race. Hagedorn ran for re-election in 1942, but was defeated in the Republican primary by Milton F. Burmaster.

During his one term in the Assembly, Hagedorn served on the Assembly Committee on Education and the Committee on Commerce and Manufactures.

== Personal life ==
Hagedorn died of cancer on June 22, 1963, at Park Falls, Wisconsin, where he had lived for eight years prior to his death. He was interred at Two Lakes Cemetery in the city of Phillips, Wisconsin, in Price County.

== Electoral history ==
=== Wisconsin Assembly (1940, 1942) ===
Wisconsin Assembly, Milwaukee 20th District Election, 1940
| Party | Candidate | Votes | % | ±% |
|---|---|---|---|---|
Republican Primary, September 1940
| Republican | Eric E. Hagedorn | 2,433 | 34.91% | |
| Republican | Walter Nortman (incumbent) | 2,105 | 30.20% | |
| Republican | Foley | 1,846 | 26.48% | |
| Republican | Schweppe | 586 | 8.41% | |
| Plurality | | 328 | 4.71% | |
| Total votes | | 6,970 | 100.0% | |
General Election, November 5, 1940
| Republican | Eric E. Hagedorn | 10,403 | 47.55% | |
| Progressive | Le Roy O. Steller | 4,597 | 21.01% | −1.71% |
| Democratic | Carl L. Borchardt | 3,794 | 17.34% | −3.90% |
| Independent Republican | Walter Nortman (incumbent) | 3,083 | 14.09% | −41.95% |
| Plurality | | 5,806 | 26.54% | -6.78% |
| Total votes | | 21,877 | 100.0% | +53.59% |
| Republican hold | | | | |

Wisconsin Assembly, Milwaukee 20th District Election, 1942
| Party | Candidate | Votes | % | ±% |
|---|---|---|---|---|
Republican Primary, September 1942
| Republican | Milton F. Burmaster | 2,756 | 56.28% | |
| Republican | Eric E. Hagedorn (incumbent) | 2,141 | 43.72% | |
| Plurality | | 615 | 12.56% | |
| Total votes | | 4,897 | 100.0% | |

Wisconsin State Assembly
| Preceded by Walter Nortman | Member of the Wisconsin State Assembly from the Milwaukee 20th district January 8, 1941 – January 13, 1943 | Succeeded by Milton F. Burmaster |
