= Senator Loveland =

Senator Loveland may refer to:

- Joseph H. Loveland (1859–1938), Vermont State Senate
- Ralph A. Loveland (1819–1899), New York State Senate
- Valoria Loveland (born 1943), Washington State Senate
