= Northern Collegiate Hockey Association =

College athletics conference in midwestern US

- Association: NCAA
- Founded: 1980
- Commissioner: G. Steven Larson (since 2013)
- Sports fielded: Ice hockey; men's: 10 teams; women's: 10 teams
- Division: Division III
- No. of teams: 10
- Headquarters: Adrian, Michigan
- Region: Midwestern United States
- Official website: www.nchahockey.org

Locations

The Northern Collegiate Hockey Association (NCHA) is a college athletic conference which operates in Illinois, Indiana, Michigan, Minnesota, and Wisconsin in the midwestern United States. It participates in the NCAA's Division III as a hockey-only conference.

The conference was formally approved in 1980 as an association of six schools in Minnesota and northwestern Wisconsin, though the teams' schedules would not be standardized until the following season. This led to some teams playing an unequal number of games in the 1980–81 season. As such, the 1981–82 season is considered the first official season of play.

In the summer of 2012, the five schools in the University of Wisconsin System announced that they would leave the conference to begin playing hockey in their all-sports conference, the Wisconsin Intercollegiate Athletic Conference. The move would have left only two men's teams in the NCHA, leading St. Norbert and St. Scholastica to join the Midwest Collegiate Hockey Association (MCHA). In April 2013, the NCHA and MCHA announced a merger, where the NCHA would absorb the MCHA's teams (of the MCHA's 10 schools, all 7 who also sponsored women's hockey played in the NCHA). The men's and women's sides will retain separate administrative structures, as well as their automatic bids to the NCAA Tournament.

== Members ==
Locations of Northern Collegiate Hockey Association members
full

=== Current ===
School	Location (Population)	Nickname	Founded	Affiliation	Enrollment	Colors	Year Joined	Primary Conference
Adrian College	Adrian, Michigan (20,645)	Bulldogs	1859	Private	1,400		Men: 2013; Women: 2009	Michigan Intercollegiate Athletic Association
Aurora University	Aurora, Illinois (180,542)	Spartans	1893	Private	4,400		Men: 2015; Women: 2017	Northern Athletics Collegiate Conference
Concordia University Wisconsin	Mequon, Wisconsin (25,142)	Falcons	1880	Private/Lutheran (LCMS)	1,600		Men: 2013; Women: 2007	Northern Athletics Collegiate Conference
University of Dubuque	Dubuque, Iowa (59,667)	Spartans	1852	Private/Presbyterian (PC USA)	2,190		Men: 2023; Women: 2023	American Rivers Conference
Lake Forest College	Lake Forest, Illinois (19,367)	Foresters	1857	Private	1,417		Men: 1992–2009, 2013; Women: 2000	Midwest Conference
Lawrence University	Appleton, Wisconsin (75,644)	Vikings	1847	Private	1,469		Men: 2013; Women: 2020	Midwest Conference
Marian University	Fond du Lac, Wisconsin (44,678)	Sabres	1936	Private/Catholic	1,411		Men: 2013; Women: 2009	Northern Athletics Collegiate Conference
Milwaukee School of Engineering	Milwaukee, Wisconsin (577,222)	Raiders	1903	Private	2,300		Men: 2013; Women: 2024	Northern Athletics Collegiate Conference
St. Norbert College	De Pere, Wisconsin (25,410)	Green Knights	1898	Private/Catholic	2,015		Men: 1994; Women: 2010	Northern Athletics Collegiate Conference
Trine University	Angola, Indiana (9,340)	Thunder	1884	Private	2,000		Men: 2017; Women: 2017	Michigan Intercollegiate Athletic Association

=== Former ===
School	Location	Nickname	Founded	Affiliation	Teams	Year Joined	Year Left	Subsequent Conference	Current Conference
Bemidji State University	Bemidji, Minnesota	Beavers	1919	Public	Men	Men: 1980	Men: 1999	CHA (D-I)	CCHA (D-I)
Finlandia University	Hancock, Michigan	Lions	1896	Private/Lutheran (ELCA)	Both	Men: 2013; Women: 2003	Men: 2023; Women: 2023	N/A (Closed in 2023)	
Minnesota State University, Mankato	Mankato, Minnesota	Mavericks	1868	Public	Men	Men: 1980	Men: 1992	D-II Independent	CCHA (D-I)
Northland College	Ashland, Wisconsin	Lumberjacks	1906	Private/United Church of Christ	Both	Men: 2013; Women: 2016	Men: 2019; Women: 2019	WIAC	N/A (Closed in 2025)
St. Cloud State University	St. Cloud, Minnesota	Huskies	1868	Public	Men	Men: 1980	Men: 1987	D-I Independent	NCHC (D-I)
The College of St. Scholastica	Duluth, Minnesota	Saints	1912	Private/Catholic	Both	Men: 1983–1991, 1994; Women: 2010	Men: 2021; Women: 2021	MIAC	
University of Wisconsin–Eau Claire	Eau Claire, Wisconsin	Blugolds	1916	Public	Both	Men: 1980; Women: 2000	Men: 2013; Women: 2013	WIAC	
University of Wisconsin–River Falls	River Falls, Wisconsin	Falcons	1874	Public	Both	Men: 1980; Women: 2000	Men: 2013; Women: 2013	WIAC	
University of Wisconsin–Stevens Point	Stevens Point, Wisconsin	Pointers	1894	Public	Both	Men: 1986; Women: 2000	Men: 2013; Women: 2013	WIAC	
University of Wisconsin–Stout	Menomonie, Wisconsin	Blue Devils	1891	Public	Both	Men: 1996	Men: 2013	WIAC	
University of Wisconsin–Superior	Superior, Wisconsin	Yellowjackets	1893	Public	Both	Men: 1980; Women: 2000	Men: 2013; Women: 2013	WIAC	

== Champions ==
=== Men ===
Season	Regular season	Tournament
1980–81 (Note: The NCHA formed in 1980, but team schedules would not be standardized until 1981.)	Mankato State	—
1981–82	Bemidji State	—
1982–83	Bemidji State	—
1983–84	Bemidji State^	—
1984–85	Bemidji State	—
1985–86	Bemidji State; Mankato State	Bemidji State^
1986–87	St. Cloud State; Mankato State	St. Cloud State
1987–88	UW–River Falls	UW–River Falls^
1988–89	UW–Stevens Point	UW–Stevens Point^
1989–90	UW–Stevens Point	UW–Stevens Point^
1990–91	Bemidji State; Mankato State	UW–Stevens Point^
1991–92	UW–Stevens Point	UW–Stevens Point
1992–93	UW–Stevens Point	UW–Stevens Point^
1993–94	UW–Superior	UW–Superior^
1994–95	Bemidji State	Bemidji State
1995–96	UW–River Falls	UW–River Falls
1996–97	St. Norbert	UW–Superior
1997–98	St. Norbert	St. Norbert
1998–99	St. Norbert	St. Norbert
1999–2000	UW–Stevens Point	UW–Superior
2000–01	UW–Superior	UW–Superior
2001–02	St. Norbert	UW–Superior^
2002–03	St. Norbert	St. Norbert
2003–04	St. Norbert	St. Norbert
2004–05	St. Norbert	St. Norbert
2005–06	St. Norbert	UW–Superior
2006–07	St. Norbert; UW–River Falls; UW–Stout	St. Norbert
2007–08	St. Norbert	St. Norbert^
2008–09	UW–Superior	UW–Stout
2009–10	St. Norbert	St. Norbert
2010–11	St. Norbert	St. Norbert^
2011–12	St. Norbert	St. Norbert^
2012–13	UW–Eau Claire	St. Norbert
2013–14	St. Norbert	St. Norbert^
2014–15	Adrian	Adrian
2015–16	Adrian	Adrian
2016–17	Adrian	St. Norbert
2017–18	Adrian	St. Norbert^
2018–19	St. Norbert	St. Norbert
2019–20	Adrian	Adrian
2020–21	Adrian	Marian

=== Women ===
Season	Regular season	Tournament
2000–01	UW–Superior	UW–River Falls
2001–02	UW–Stevens Point	UW–Stevens Point
2002–03	UW–River Falls	UW–River Falls
2003–04	UW–Superior	UW–Stevens Point
2004–05	UW–Stevens Point	UW–Stevens Point
2005–06	UW–Stevens Point	UW–Stevens Point
2006–07	UW–Superior	UW–Stevens Point
2007–08	UW–Superior	UW–Superior
2008–09	UW–River Falls	UW–River Falls
2009–10	Lake Forest	UW–River Falls
2010–11	UW–River Falls	Adrian
2011–12	UW–River Falls	UW–River Falls
2012–13	UW–River Falls	St. Norbert
2013–14	Lake Forest	Lake Forest
2014–15	Adrian	Lake Forest
2015–16	Adrian	Adrian
2016–17	Adrian	Adrian
2017–18	Adrian	Adrian
2018–19	Adrian	Adrian
2019–20	Adrian	Adrian
2020–21	St. Scholastica	Adrian

^ Won National Championship

== Arenas ==
School	Arena	Capacity
Adrian	Arrington Ice Arena	500
Aurora	Fox Valley Ice Arena	3,500
Concordia Wisconsin	Ozaukee Ice Center	1,000
Finlandia	Houghton County Arena	1200
Lake Forest	Alumni Memorial Fieldhouse	1,000
Lawrence	Appleton Family Ice Center	1,200
Marian	Blue Line Family Ice Center	2,000
Milwaukee Engineering	Kern Center	800
Northland	Bay Area Civic Center	1,000
St. Norbert	Cornerstone Community Center	2,000
Trine	Thunder Ice Arena	700

== See also ==
- Harris Cup
