= Robert Spitzer =

Robert Spitzer may refer to:

- Robert Spitzer (political scientist) (born 1953), American political scientist
- Robert Spitzer (priest) (born 1952), American Jesuit priest and philosopher
- Robert Spitzer (psychiatrist) (1932–2015), American psychiatrist
- Robert R. Spitzer (1922–2019), American industrialist and educator
