= Burmaster =

Burmaster is a surname. Notable people with the surname include:

- Elizabeth Burmaster (born 1954), American educator
- Jack Burmaster (1926–2005), American basketball player and coach
- Milton F. Burmaster (1905–?), American politician
