= Finlandia University =

Defunct private university in Hancock, Michigan, US

- Former names: The Suomi College and Theological Seminary (1896–2000)
- Motto: Dominus Illuminatio Mea
- Motto in English: The Lord is my Light
- Type: Private
- Active: September 8, 1896–May 7, 2023
- Accreditation: Higher Learning Commission
- Religious affiliation: Evangelical Lutheran Church
- Endowment: US$5,786,875 (2020)
- Budget: US$13,106,234 (2020)
- President: Timothy Pinnow
- Students: 430 (fall 2021)
- Location: 601 Quincy St., Hancock, Michigan, 49930, U.S. 47.1276°N 88.5894°W
- Campus: 24 acres (9.7 ha); Rural
- Avg. class size: 11
- Colors: Blue, gray and white
- Nickname: Lions
- Sporting affiliations: C2C Conference (NCAA D-III)
- Mascot: Riku F. Lion
- Website: finlandia.edu (archived)
- Location within Michigan Location within the United States

Finlandia University was a private university in Hancock, Michigan, United States. Founded in 1896 as Suomi Opisto (Finnish College) and Theological Seminary, it was affiliated with the Evangelical Lutheran Church in America. It was the only private university in the Upper Peninsula. The university closed after the spring semester of 2023 due to enrollment and financial challenges.

== History ==
Finlandia University was founded as Suomi College on September 8, 1896, by J. K. Nikander. During the 1880s, large numbers of Finns immigrated to Hancock, Michigan to labor in the copper and lumber industries. As a mission pastor of the Finnish Evangelical Lutheran Church of America headquartered in Hancock, Nikander observed that Swedish and Finnish immigrants along the Delaware River did not train new ministers, and he feared a loss of Finnish identity. The college's role was to preserve Finnish culture, train Lutheran ministers and teach English. During the 1920s, Suomi College became a liberal arts college and in 1958, the seminary separated from the college. On July 1, 2000, Suomi College changed its name to Finlandia University.

The cornerstone of Old Main, the first building erected at Suomi College, was laid on May 30, 1898. Jacobsville sandstone, quarried at the Portage Entry of the Keweenaw waterway, was brought by barge, cut, and used to construct the Old Main. Dedicated on January 21, 1900, it contained a dormitory, kitchen, laundry, classrooms, offices, library, chapel, and lounge. A marker designating the college and its Old Main building as Michigan Historic Sites was erected by the Michigan Historical Commission in 1991.

The burgeoning college quickly outgrew this building. In 1901 a frame structure, housing a gym, meeting hall, and music center, was erected on an adjacent lot. The frame building was demolished when Nikander Hall, named for Suomi's founder, was constructed in 1939. The hall was designed by the architectural firm of Eliel Saarinen and J. Robert F. Swanson. In addition to Old Main, the present day main campus consists of Nikander Hall, Mannerheim Hall, Wargelin Hall, Finlandia Hall, the Paavo Nurmi Center for Physical Education, the Kivi House, Hoover Center, the Finnish American Heritage Center, the Chapel of St. Matthew, and the Jutila Center.

Finlandia University was affiliated with the Lutheran church since its inception and in 1988, became affiliated with the Evangelical Lutheran Church in America. The curriculum, campus events, and the community explored the value of faith, vocation, and service. Finlandia University was accredited by the Higher Learning Commission of the North Central Association for Colleges and Schools. In 1996, the university transitioned from a two-year college to a four-year university. Starting with the 2020–21 academic year, Finlandia's admissions policy contained no requirements for SAT or ACT scores, only requiring a secondary school transcript.

In 2022, Philip R. Johnson was succeeded by Timothy Pinnow as the institution's president. On March 2, 2023, Timothy Pinnow announced that Finlandia University would close after the spring 2023 semester. Pinnow cited a lack of interest in enrollment and the debt load of the university as factors in shutting down operations.

The university's board of trustees voted on March 14, 2023, to officially dissolve the university. Finlandia also announced that some staff had been laid off to free up funding for operations related to student transfers. They also announced that all other staff would be laid off following commencement.

The university set up agreements for students to finish their education at Michigan Technological University, Bay de Noc Community College, Adrian College, Wartburg College, Northern Michigan University and a few other colleges.

== Campus ==
Finlandia University's campus was located in Hancock, Michigan, on the Keweenaw Peninsula in Michigan's Upper Peninsula. The Keweenaw Peninsula stretches north into Lake Superior. The central building on campus was called "Old Main" and is recognized on the National Register of Historic Places.

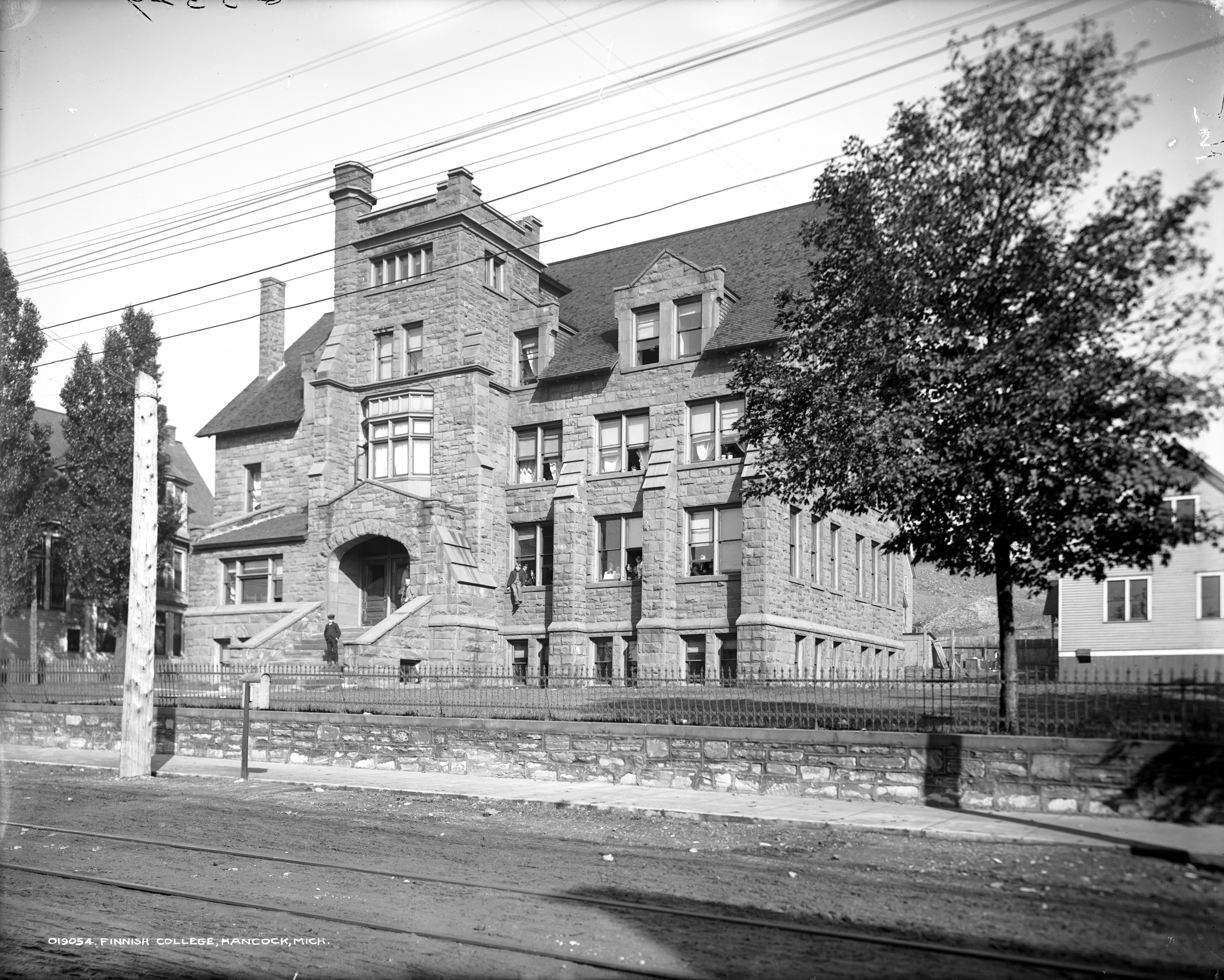
Old Main, between 1900 and 1906

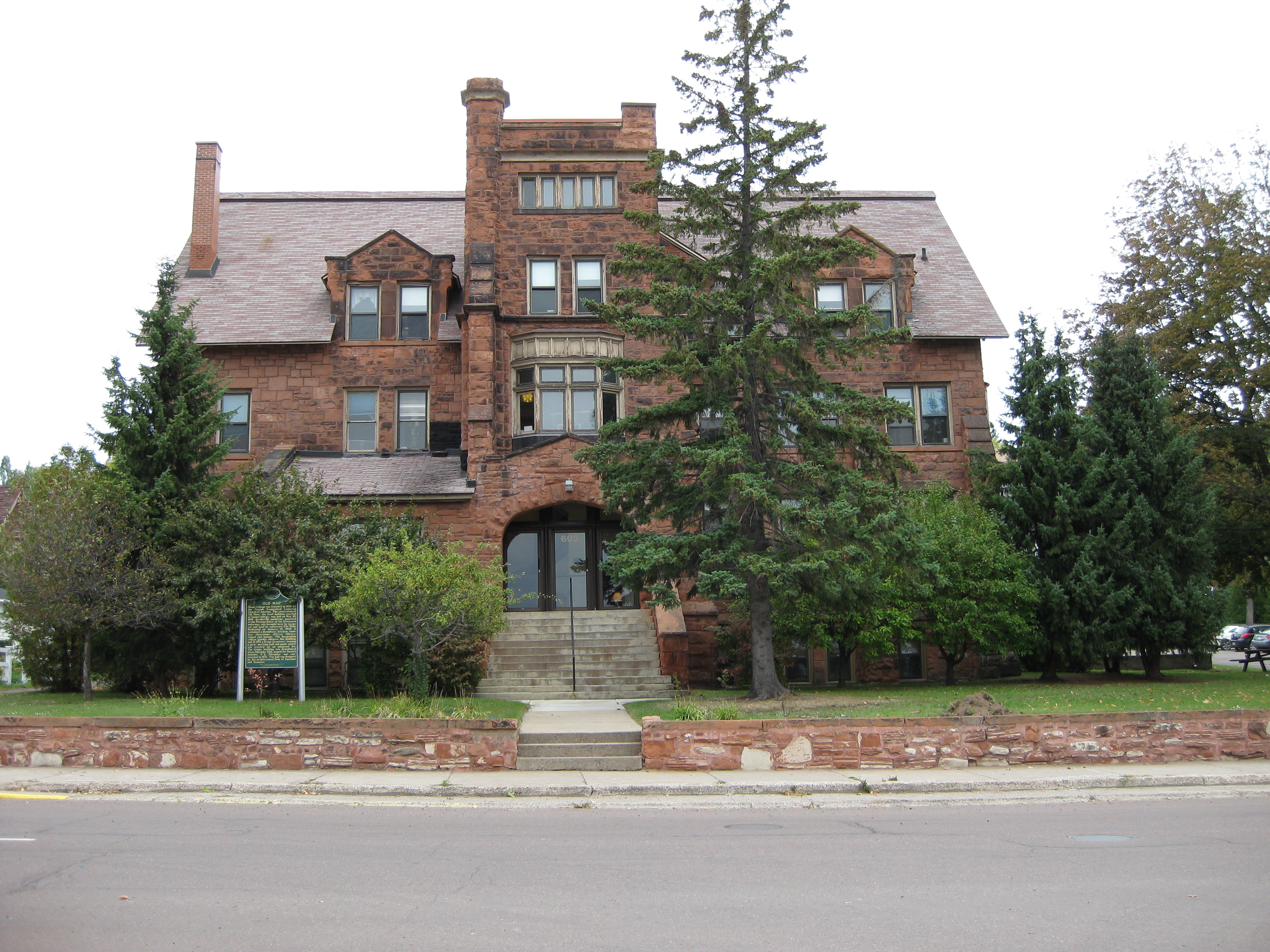
Old Main in 2008

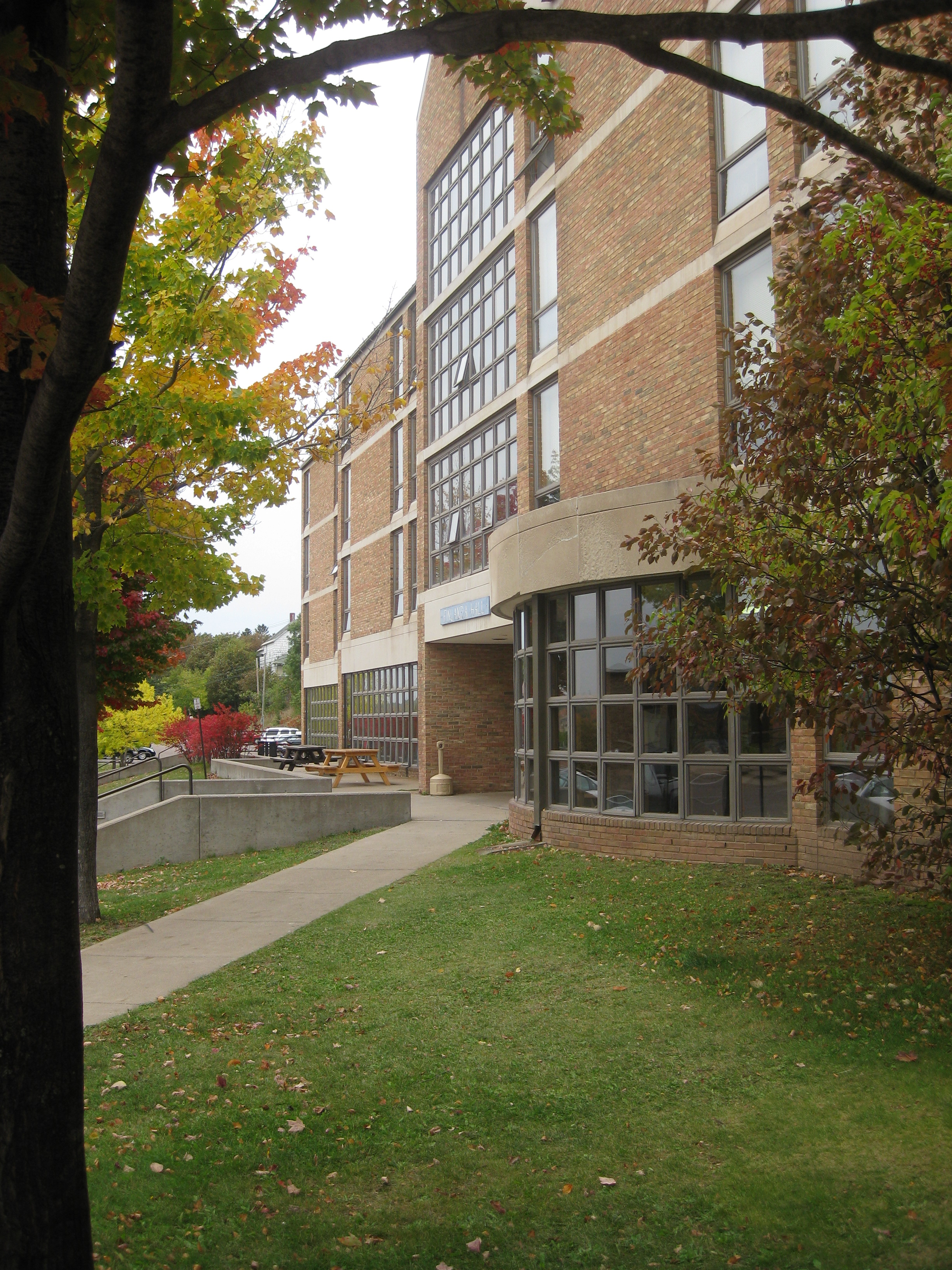
Finlandia Hall

=== Finnish-American Heritage Center ===
Also part of Finlandia University, and serving both the campus and the community, was the Finnish American Heritage Center which hosted numerous university and community events and housed a museum, art gallery, and theater. The Finnish American Historical Archives are located there as of November 2024.

The Finlandia Foundation National (FFN) purchased the Finnish American Heritage Center, the Finnish American Historical Archive, the Finlandia Art Gallery, the Finnish American Folk School, the Price of Freedom Museum, The Finnish American Reporter and the North Wind Books store in 2024.

== Academics ==
Finlandia's most popular undergraduate majors, by 2021 graduates, were: Registered Nursing/Registered Nurse (7), Small Business Administration/Management (5), Criminal Justice/Police Science (5), Business Administration, Management and Operations (4), and Psychology (4).

== Athletics ==
There were 12 NCAA Division III athletic sports at Finlandia, whose teams were known as Lions, competing primarily as a member of the Coast to Coast Athletic Conference (C2C) since 2020. Women's athletics included: basketball, cross country, golf, ice hockey, soccer, softball and volleyball. Men's athletics included baseball, basketball, cross country, football, golf, ice hockey and soccer. Co-ed Esports were added as varsity-level sports in the 2020–2021 season.

=== Baseball ===
Finlandia University's men's baseball team competed as an affiliate member of the City University of New York Athletic Conference (CUNYAC) in 2018 and as an affiliate member of the Wisconsin Intercollegiate Athletic Conference (WIAC) in 2019. As an affiliate member of the CUNYAC, the team reached the postseason for the first and only time, finishing with a 10–18 record and placing third in the conference tournament. Between 2011 and 2022, the team compiled a 51–291 win-loss record.

=== Football ===
Finlandia University's football team played its first season in the Fall of 2015. From 2015 to 2017, they played football in Division III as an independent. For the 2018 and 2019 seasons, Finlandia competed in the Michigan Intercollegiate Athletic Association. After they did not play during the 2020 season due to the COVID-19 pandemic, they joined the Upper Midwest Athletic Conference for the 2021 and 2022 seasons. Over seven seasons, the team compiled a 5–56 record, scoring 575 points and having 2,711 points scored against for an average of 45 points per game.

=== Ice hockey ===
Finlandia University had both men's and women's Division III ice hockey teams. The men's team played their first season beginning in 2001, and the women's beginning in 2004. They played their games at Houghton County Arena. From 2004 to 2013, they played in the Midwest Collegiate Hockey Association conference, and from 2013 to 2023 in the Northern Collegiate Hockey Association conference. From 2004 to 2023, the men's team compiled a record of 105–279–19. In the 2007–2008 season, the team compiled a 14–6 record and defeated Milwaukee School of Engineering to be crowned MCHC Champions.

=== Esports ===
Finlandia introduced Esports in the Fall of 2020 to be run under the direction of Finlandia's Athletic Department. The school's first season included nine games: Overwatch, Call of Duty, Fortnite, FIFA, Madden NFL, Super Smash Bros., League of Legends, Hearthstone, and Rocket League. The team competed in the Eastern College Athletic Conference and played their games at Hirvonen Hall from 2022 to 2023. In 2022, the school's Valorant team won the National Esports Collegiate Conference National Championship in the Navigators Division.

=== Conference affiliation ===
- Coast to Coast Athletic Conference: baseball, men's & women's basketball, men's & women's soccer, softball, volleyball
- Northern Collegiate Hockey Association: men's (since 2013) & women's (since 2003) ice hockey
- Upper Midwest Athletic Conference: football (since 2021)

== Notable alumni ==
Notable alumni of Finlandia University include:

- Trent Daavettila, ice hockey player
- Ryan Donovan, ice hockey player
- Sanna Kannasto, labor activist and feminist
- Medaria Arradondo, Police Chief of the Minneapolis Police Department
- John Raymond Ylitalo, 29th United States Ambassador to Paraguay
