= Ryan Donovan =

American ice hockey player

- Born: December 20, 1987 (age 38) Pinckney, Michigan
- Height: 6 ft 2 in (188 cm)
- Weight: 174 lb (79 kg; 12 st 6 lb)
- Position: Goaltender
- Caught: Left
- Played for: HC Levy; Utah Grizzlies; Berlin River Drivers
- NHL draft: Undrafted
- Playing career: 2011–2016

Ryan Donovan (born December 20, 1987) is an American former professional ice hockey goaltender.

== Career ==
Donovan attended Finlandia University from 2007 to 2011, where he played in the Midwest Collegiate Hockey Association (MCHA).

Donovan began his professional career during the 2011–2012 season by playing 25 games with HC Levy in the Ukrainian Professional Hockey League. On October 10, 2012, he signed a contract with the Utah Grizzlies and appeared in four ECHL games during the 2012–13 ECHL season. He appeared in four games for the Grizzlies and earned a 7.57 Goals Against Average.

Donovan signed with the Berlin River Drivers of the Federal Hockey League for the 2015–2016 season. Donovan was named Pro Hockey News Goaltender of the Month for February after recording a 4-0-0-1 record and allowing 28 goals on 170 shots while earning a 4.73 goals-against average and a .876 save percentage. He recorded seven wins to nine losses and a 4.91 GAA on the season.

== Career statistics ==
			Regular season
Season	Team	League	GP	W	L	T	MIN	GA	SO	GAA	SV%
2005-06	Traverse City North Stars	NAHL	24	5	12	4	1234	97	0	4.72	.877
2006-07	Traverse City North Stars	NAHL	5	2	2	1	308	19	0	3.69	.887
2007-08	Finlandia University	MCHA	19	12	5	1	1110	49	0	2.65	.890
2008-09	Finlandia University	MCHA	20	7	12	1	1205	71	1	3.53	.890
2009-10	Finlandia University	MCHA	15	3	10	2	869	70	0	4.84	.865
2010-11	Finlandia University	MCHA	13	2	10	0	609	46	0	4.53	.890
2012-13	Utah Grizzles	ECHL	4	0	3	0	198	25	0	7.57	.760
2015-16	Berlin River Drivers	FHL	19	7	9	1	941	77	0	4.91	.875
