= Harris Cup =

- Sport: Ice hockey
- Awarded for: Playoff champion of the Northern Collegiate Hockey Association

History
- First award: 1999
- Most recent: Adrian Bulldogs
- Website: https://adrianbulldogs.com/landing/index

The Harris Cup is an ice hockey championship trophy, awarded annually to the NCAA Division III Northern Collegiate Hockey Association (NCHA) league playoff champion.

The trophy originated with the Midwest Collegiate Hockey Association. The MCHA first awarded a championship trophy in 1998. The trophy was renamed the Harris Cup in 2002 and first awarded under that name in 2003. All previous winners of the MCHA trophy are inscribed on the trophy and recognized as Harris Cup awardees. The trophy is named after Dan Harris, who served as MCHA league president through 2002 and is the long-serving athletics director for Milwaukee School of Engineering. Following the MCHA and NCHA's merger in 2013, the trophy will be awarded to the NCHA's playoff champion beginning in 2014.

== Winners ==
Year	Winner
MCHA Tournament Champion
1999	Findlay
2000	Minnesota–Crookston
2001	Marian
2002	Marian
2003	Minnesota–Crookston
2004	Minnesota–Crookston
2005	Milwaukee School of Engineering
2006	Milwaukee School of Engineering
2007	Finlandia
2008	Adrian
2009	Adrian
2010	Adrian
2011	Adrian
2012	Milwaukee School of Engineering
2013	Adrian
NCHA Tournament Champion
2014	St. Norbert
2015	Adrian
2016	Adrian
2017	St. Norbert
2018	St. Norbert
2019	St. Norbert
2020	Adrian
