= James I. Finley =

American engineer

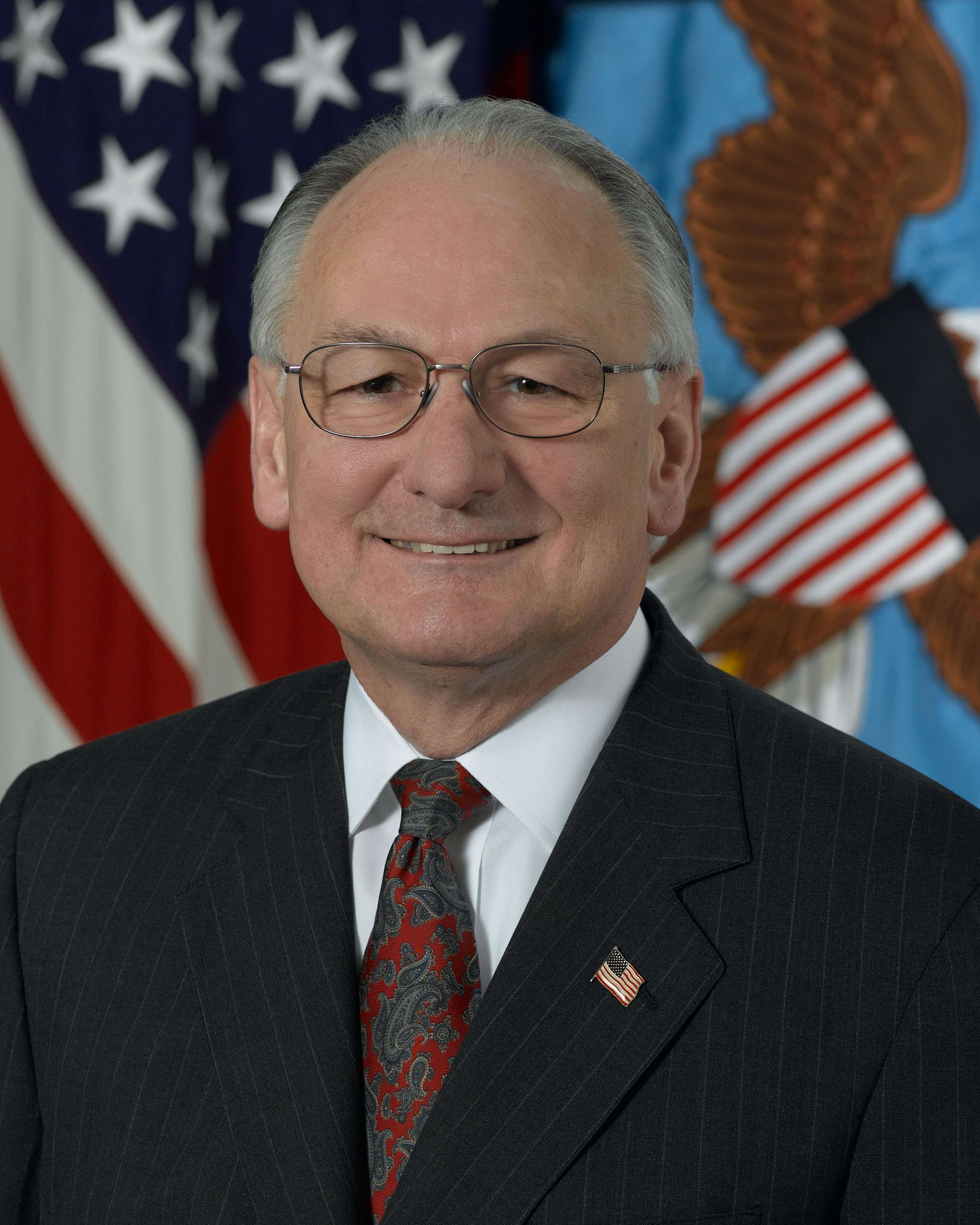
Portrait of Finley

James Ivan Finley is the former Deputy Under Secretary of Defense for Acquisition and Technology in the United States Department of Defense. He was confirmed by the United States Senate on February 19, 2006.

The following statement was issued by the White House on December 19, 2005:

The President intends to nominate James I. Finley, of Minnesota, to be Deputy Under Secretary of Defense for Acquisition and Technology. Mr. Finley currently serves as President of The Finley Group, LLC, a consulting company he formed in 2002. Prior to this, he was President and chief executive officer of SMARTSKIN, Inc. Mr. Finley has served in a managerial capacity for General Electric, Singer, Lear Siegler, United Technologies and General Dynamics, where he was a Corporate Officer, President of Information Systems and Chair of the Business Development Council. Mr. Finley received his bachelor's degree from the Milwaukee School of Engineering and his master's degree from California State University Fresno.
