= Hermann Viets =

American academic administrator (1943–2017)

- Born: 28 January 1943; Quedlinburg, Germany
- Died: 1 October 2017 (aged 74); South Kingstown, Rhode Island
- Education: New York University
- Spouse: Pamela Deane
- Scientific career
- Fields: Astronautics engineer, educator, educational administrator
- Workplaces: Milwaukee School of Engineering, University of Rhode Island, West Virginia University, Wright State University

Hermann Viets (28 January 1943 – 1 October 2017) was a German-born American astronautics engineer and president of Milwaukee School of Engineering (MSOE). He was MSOE's fourth president, assuming the position in 1991.

== Early life ==
Viets was born in Quedlinburg, Germany on 28 January 1943.

He earned all three of his degrees from New York University's Polytechnic Institute: a B.S. in aerospace engineering in 1965, an M.S. in astronautics in 1966, and a doctorate in astronautics in 1970.

== Career ==
Viets held seven US patents.

He was Professor of Engineering at Wright State University in Dayton, Ohio. He was a professor and Associate Dean for Research at West Virginia University in Morgantown, West Virginia. the Dean of Engineering at the University of Rhode Island in Kingston, Rhode Island, before becoming president of MSOE. He was one of the co-founders of the International Engineering Program at URI.

He has also been a visiting scientist, aerospace engineer and research group leader for Wright Patterson Air Force Base Aerospace Research Laboratories in Dayton, Ohio; and a lecturer at the Von Karman Institute in Brussels, Belgium.

Viets died at his home in South Kingstown, Rhode Island on 1 October 2017.

== Legacy ==
The athletic field at the Milwaukee School of Engineering was named in Viets's honor in 2013. In 2019, the University announced a brand new residence tower bearing his name.

Preceded by Robert R. Spitzer	President of MSOE; 1991-2015	Succeeded by John Y. Walz
