= J. Richard Steffy =

American archaeologist (1924–2007)

John Richard Steffy (May 1, 1924 Lancaster, Pennsylvania – November 29, 2007 Bryan, Texas) was an American nautical archaeologist.

He attended the Milwaukee School of Engineering. He taught at University of Pennsylvania. He founded the Institute of Nautical Archaeology, with Michael L. Katzev, and George Bass. He was Professor Emeritus at Texas A&M University, and creator of the Ship Reconstruction Laboratory.

He married Lucille Koch Steffy, (died in 1991).

== Awards ==
- 1985 MacArthur Fellows Program

== Works ==
- Wooden Ship Building and the Interpretation of Shipwrecks, College Station: Texas A&M University Press, 1994. ISBN 978-1-86176-104-0
