= Northern Wrestling Association =

- Conference: NCAA
- Founded: 2006
- Sports fielded: 1 (wrestling); men's: 1; women's: 0
- Division: Division III
- No. of teams: 6
- Region: Upper Midwest

The Northern Wrestling Association is a college athletic conference. It participates in the NCAA's Division III as a wrestling-only conference. Its first season was held in 2006–07, and the member schools include the following institutions: Concordia University Wisconsin, Knox College, Lakeland College and the Milwaukee School of Engineering.

PAST TEAM CHAMPIONS

2007-08
Lakeland College
2008-09
Lakeland College
2009-10
Lakeland College
2010-11
Lakeland College
2011-12
Concordia University – Wisconsin
Milwaukee School of Engineering
2012-13
Concordia University - Wisconsin
2013-14
Concordia University - Wisconsin
2014-15
Concordia University - Wisconsin
