= Oscar Werwath =

- Born: 1880; Stallupönen, Germany
- Died: March 20, 1948 (aged 67–68); Milwaukee, Wisconsin
- Education: University of Applied Sciences Mittweida
- Known for: Founder of MSOE
- Scientific career
- Fields: Engineer
- Workplaces: Milwaukee School of Engineering (MSOE)

Oscar Werwath (1880 – March 20, 1948) was the founder and first president of the Milwaukee School of Engineering in Milwaukee, Wisconsin, United States. He is buried at Forest Home Cemetery.

Born in Stallupönen, Germany on May 3, 1880, Werwath was the son of department store owner Carl and his wife, Johanna. When he was 23, shortly after finishing his degree from University of Applied Sciences Mittweida, he emigrated to Wisconsin. Knowing the strong German-American reputation and industrial center of Milwaukee, he decided to settle there, becoming employed at the Louis Allis Co. shortly after. Seeing that skilled engineering in Milwaukee was in great demand, Werwath conceptualized a local school that could accommodate the needed work force. Approaching the president of Rheude's Business School, Werwath was given permission to establish a series of night classes for young men in practical electricity. Shortly after the courses began, enrollment grew to be too large for the business school. Still working for the Louis Allis Co. in 1905, Werwath was encouraged to open an engineering school and Allis donated $500 toward the "School of Engineering". "Milwaukee" was added to the school's name in 1932. Oscar was president of the school until his death in 1948.

== Personal life ==
In 1908 Oscar and Johanna married and resettled in Milwaukee. The Werwaths had four children; Karl (1909-1979), Greta (1910-2003), Hannah (1913-1984), and Heinz (1916-1987), all of whom worked at the Milwaukee School of Engineering at some point in their life. Karl, Oscar's oldest son, was a graduate of his father's school in 1936 and became president one month after his father's death in 1948 until 1977.

Educational offices
| Preceded by (none) | President of MSOE; 1903-1948 | Succeeded by Karl Werwath |
