= Midwest Collegiate Hockey Association =

- Conference: NCAA
- Founded: 1998
- Folded: 2013
- Commissioner: G. Steven Larson (since 2010)
- Sports fielded: Ice hockey; men's: yes; women's: no
- Division: Division III
- No. of teams: 8
- Headquarters: Waukesha, Wisconsin
- Region: Midwestern United States
- Website: www.mchahockey.com

Midwest Collegiate Hockey Association was a college athletic conference which operated in the midwestern United States. It participated in the NCAA's Division III as a hockey-only conference. The conference included only men's teams.

== History ==
The league was founded in 1998 with six teams: Benedictine University, the University of Findlay, Lawrence University, Marian University, the Milwaukee School of Engineering, and Northland College. After one year in the conference, Benedictine dropped hockey, and Findlay moved to the Division I College Hockey America conference. The University of Minnesota Crookston joined in 1999. As a Division II school, Minnesota Crookston operated the hockey team with no scholarships like the other Division III members of the league. While they competed in the conference championship, they were ineligible for the NCAA Division III Tournament, but they were eligible for the Harris Cup.

In 2007, in order to meet NCAA guidelines and receive an automatic bid for the Division III tournament, the NCHA mandated that all member programs be Division III by the end of the 2008–09 season. Minnesota–Crookston continued to play in the conference for the next two years but after the '09 season the university dropped varsity hockey and were replaced by Lake Forest.

Finlandia University joined the conference for the 2004–05 season. Before the 2007–08 season, the MCHA added Concordia University in Mequon, Wisconsin, and Adrian College in Adrian, Michigan.

In the summer of 2012, the five hockey-playing schools in the University of Wisconsin System announced that they would leave the Northern Collegiate Hockey Association (NCHA) to begin playing hockey in their all-sports conference, the Wisconsin Intercollegiate Athletic Conference. The move would have left only two men's teams in the NCHA, leading St. Norbert College and the College of St. Scholastica to join the MCHA. In April 2013, the NCHA and MCHA announced a merger, where the NCHA would absorb the MCHA's teams (of the MCHA's 10 schools, all seven who also sponsored women's hockey played in the NCHA). The men's and women's sides will retain separate administrative structures, as well as their automatic bids to the NCAA Tournament.

== Members ==
School	Location	Nickname	Founded	Affiliation	Colors	Joined	Left	Subsequent conference	Current conference
Adrian College	Adrian, Michigan	Bulldogs	1859	Private/Methodist		2007	2013	NCHA	
Benedictine University	Lisle, Illinois	Eagles	1887	Private/Catholic		1998	1999	Dropped program	
Concordia University Wisconsin	Mequon, Wisconsin	Falcons	1880	Private/Lutheran (LCMS)		2007	2013	NCHA	
University of Findlay	Findlay, Ohio	Oilers	1882	Private		1998	1999	CHA (D-I)	Dropped program (2004)
Finlandia University	Hancock, Michigan	Lions	1896	Private/Lutheran (ELCA)		2004	2013	NCHA	N/A (Closed in 2023)
Lake Forest College	Lake Forest, Illinois	Foresters	1857	Private		2009	2013	NCHA	
Lawrence University	Appleton, Wisconsin	Vikings	1847	Private		1999	2013	NCHA	
Marian University	Fond du Lac, Wisconsin	Sabres	1936	Private/Catholic		1998	2013	NCHA	
Milwaukee School of Engineering	Milwaukee, Wisconsin	Raiders	1903	Private		1998	2013	NCHA	
University of Minnesota Crookston	Crookston, Minnesota	Golden Eagles	1905	Public		1999	2009	Dropped program	
Northland College	Ashland, Wisconsin	Lumberjacks	1906	Private/United Church of Christ		1998	2013	NCHA	

== Champions ==
MCHA regular season champions

- 1998–99: Findlay
- 1999–2000: UM–Crookston
- 2000–01: UM–Crookston
- 2002–03: UM–Crookston
- 2001–02: Marian
- 2003–04: Marian
- 2004–05: MSOE
- 2005–06: MSOE
- 2006–07: MSOE
- 2007–08: Adrian
- 2008–09: Adrian
- 2009–10: Adrian
- 2010–11: Adrian
- 2011–12: Adrian
- 2012–13: Adrian

Harris Cup Champions (playoffs)

- 2002: Marian
- 2003: UM–Crookston
- 2004: UM–Crookston
- 2005: MSOE
- 2006: MSOE
- 2007: Finlandia
- 2008: Adrian
- 2009: Adrian
- 2010: Adrian
- 2011: Adrian
- 2012: MSOE
- 2013: Adrian

NCAA Tournament Results

- 2010 Adrian
  - First Round vs. St. Norbert College L 3–4
- 2011 Adrian
  - Quarterfinals vs. Elmira College W 5–3
  - Semifinals vs. Oswego State University W 5–3
  - Championship vs. St. Norbert College L 3–4
- 2012 MSOE
  - First Round vs. Gustavus Adolphus College L 1–3
- 2013 Adrian
  - Quarterfinals vs. Oswego State University L 2-3 (OT)
