= Joseph H. Loveland =

American politician

Joseph H. Loveland (1859–1938) was a member of the Vermont House of Representatives and Vermont Senate.

== Biography ==
Loveland was born on March 10, 1859, in Wauwatosa, Wisconsin, into the Congregationalist family of Aaron Loveland and Laura Goodell. In 1866, his family moved back to his father's hometown of Norwich, Vermont. Loveland married Emma Healy (1865–1945) of Newark, New Jersey. He died in Norwich on October 20, 1938, at the age of 79.

== Career ==
Loveland was a member of the House of Representatives from 1923 to 1925 and of the Senate in 1927.
