= Walter Nortman =

American politician

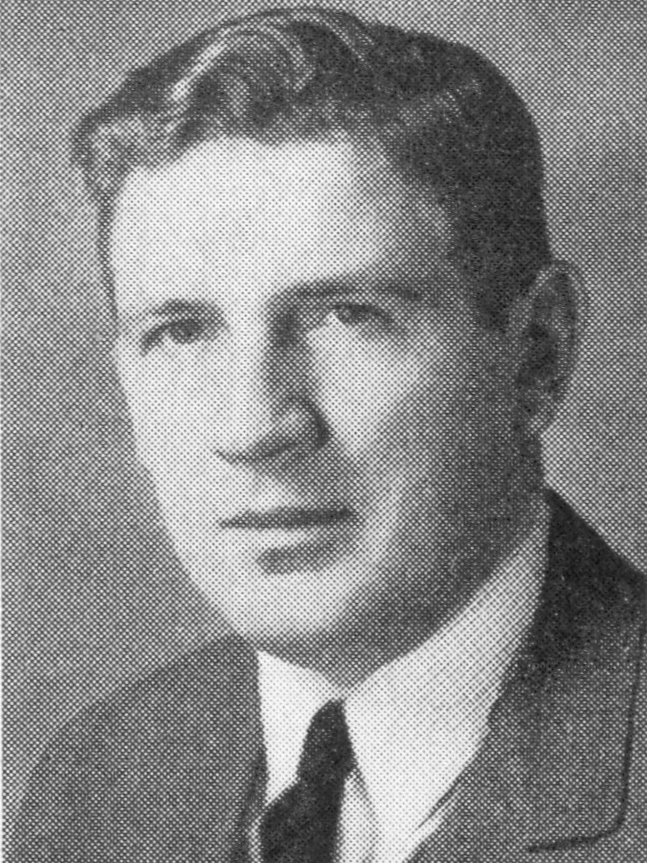
Nortman circa 1940

Walter Nortman was an American politician. He was a member of the Wisconsin State Assembly.

== Biography ==
Nortman was born in Wauwatosa, Wisconsin. He interned at Harley-Davidson before graduating from the University of Wisconsin Law School.

== Political career ==
Nortman was a member of the Assembly from 1939 to 1940. He was a Republican.
