= Kern Center =

Athletics facility in Milwaukee, Wisconsin

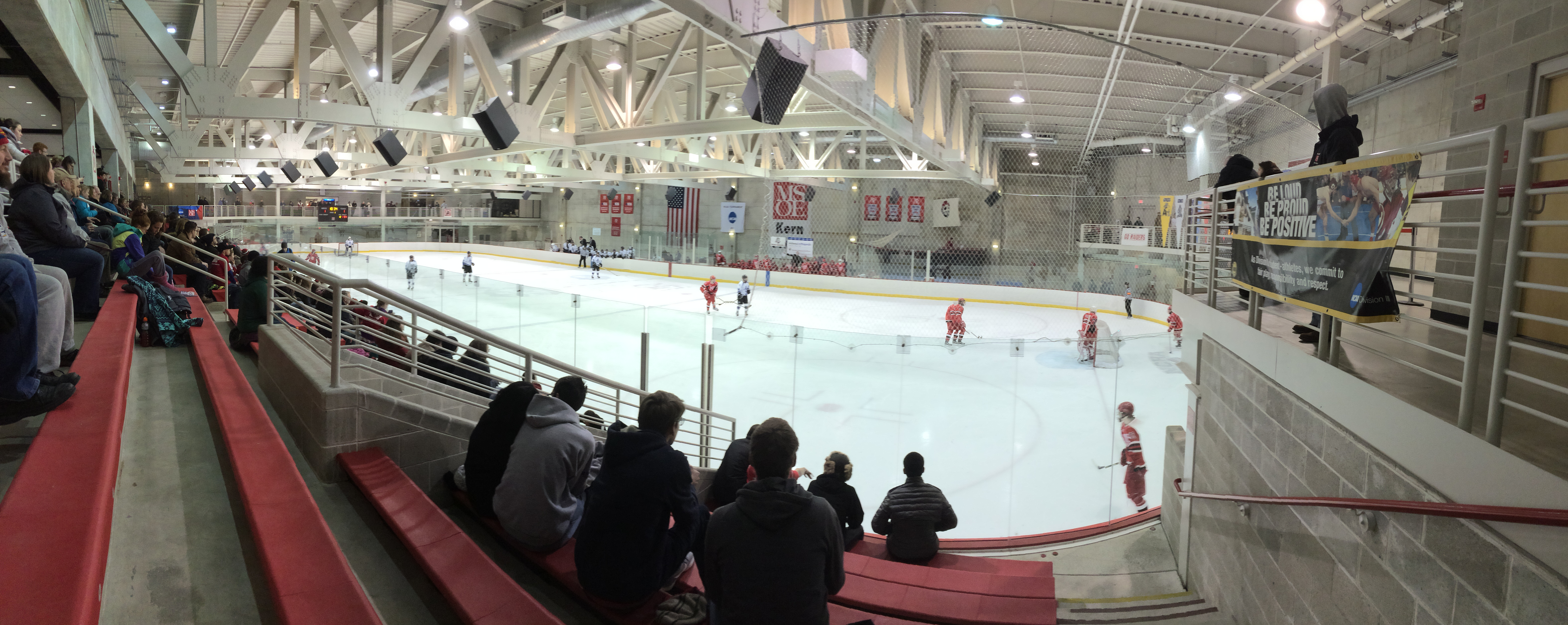
- Panorama of the Kern Center at MSOE in Milwaukee on 2-13-16 with MSOE playing Aurora University
- Interactive map of Kern Center
- Location: 1245 N Broadway St; Milwaukee, WI 53202
- Coordinates: 43°02′47″N 87°54′32″W
- Owner: Milwaukee School of Engineering
- Operator: Milwaukee School of Engineering
- Capacity: 1,200
- Public transit: MCTS

Construction
- Groundbreaking: 11 April 2003
- Opened: 29 October 2004
- Cost: $31 million
- Architects: Uihlein-Wilson Architects, Milwaukee
- Main contractors: Hunzinger Construction Co., Brookfield, WI; RDG Planning & Design, Des Moines, IA

Tenants
- MSOE Raiders; Milwaukee Admirals

The Kern Center is a 210,000-square-foot (19,500 m^{2}) athletics and fitness facility in Milwaukee, Wisconsin. It is home to many sports at the Milwaukee School of Engineering, including ice hockey, wrestling, men's and women's basketball and volleyball. The building is named for Robert and Patricia Kern, the center's major benefactors. The financial support for the facility's land was given by Eckhart and Ischi Grohmann.

The Kern Center is home to the school's Health, Development, and Wellness area. The departments in this area include Health Services, Counseling Services, and Servant-Leadership.

Ground broke for construction of the Kern Center on 11 April 2003, and the facility was dedicated on 29 October 2004.

== Facilities ==
The Kern Center Arena (115 ft × 115 ft or 35 m × 35 m) has a seating capacity of 600 and hosts MSOE varsity competitions, campus special events, and community rentals.

The Kern Center Ice Arena (NHL-sized: 200 ft × 85 ft or 61 m × 26 m) located in the lower level of the building, has a seating capacity of 800, and hosts hockey games, open skating, ice shows, skating lessons, campus events, and community rentals. The ice arena also acts as the pre-season home of the Milwaukee Admirals.
