= Robert R. Spitzer =

American agricultural researcher (1922–2019)

3rd President of Milwaukee School of Engineering
- In office 1977–1991
- Preceded by: Karl Werwath
- Succeeded by: Hermann Viets

Personal details
- Born: May 4, 1922 Waukesha, Wisconsin
- Died: April 30, 2019 (aged 96) Burlington, Wisconsin
- Education: University of Wisconsin–Madison
- Occupation: Agricultural researcher

Robert R. Spitzer (4 May 1922 – 30 April 2019) was an American agricultural researcher who worked with Murphy Products Co. for 28 years and was the third president of Milwaukee School of Engineering.

Spitzer was born on 4 May 1922 in Waukesha, Wisconsin. He died on 30 April 2019 in Burlington, Wisconsin.

Educational offices
Preceded by Karl Werwath	President of MSOE; 1977–1991	Succeeded by Hermann Viets
