= Milton F. Burmaster =

American politician

Milton Frederick Burmaster (born Burmeister; January 19, 1905 – October 7, 1983) was an American politician. He was a member of the Wisconsin State Assembly during the sessions of 1943, 1945, 1947 and 1949. Additionally, he was a Wauwatosa, Wisconsin alderman from 1937 to 1941 and President of the Wauwatosa Common Council in 1941. He was a Republican.

He was born in Milwaukee, Wisconsin, to German-American parents Karl Burmeister and Minnie Ritt.
