= Milwaukee School of Engineering =

Private university in Milwaukee, Wisconsin, US

- Former name: School of Engineering (1903–1932)
- Type: Private university
- Established: 1903
- Endowment: $100.5 million (2025)
- President: Eric Baumgartner
- Faculty: 138 full-time
- Students: 2,729 (fall 2022)
- Undergraduates: 2,575 (fall 2022)
- Postgraduates: 154 (fall 2022)
- Location: Milwaukee, Wisconsin, U.S.
- Campus: Urban, 22 acres (8.9 ha)
- Colors: Red and white
- Nickname: Raiders
- Sporting affiliations: NCAA Division III - Northern Athletics Collegiate Conference; Midwest Collegiate Volleyball League; Northern Collegiate Hockey Association; Midwest Lacrosse Conference; College Conference of Illinois and Wisconsin
- Mascot: Roscoe Raider
- Website: msoe.edu

The Milwaukee School of Engineering (MSOE) is a private university in Milwaukee, Wisconsin, United States. Founded in 1903, the university has a primary focus on undergraduate engineering education with additional programs in business, mathematics, and nursing. Its 22-acre (8.9 ha) campus is in the East Town neighborhood of downtown Milwaukee.

In the fall of 2022, it enrolled 2,575 undergraduate and 154 graduate students. As of fall 2018, the university had a total of 138 full-faculty. Through eight academic departments, the university offers 16 bachelor's degree programs, 10 of which are in engineering; the university also offers nine master's degrees. MSOE fields 21 varsity teams known as the "Raiders" and most teams play in the NCAA Division III as part of the Northern Athletics Collegiate Conference (NACC).

== History ==
Milwaukee School of Engineering was founded in 1903 by Oscar Werwath and initially called the School of Engineering. Werwath's goal was to meet the needs of the workforce for the growing engineering field. Werwath was the first person to plan an American educational institution based on an applications-oriented curriculum. The first classes began in the fall of 1903 at Rheude's Business College. By fall, 1905, the enrollment reached almost 100, exceeding the capacity of the business college. The school was subsequently moved to a new building with help from Werwath's colleague, Louis Allis. In spring, 1906, the school graduated its first class, enrolling about 200 students that fall.

By 1920, the school consisted of four specific programs focused around electricity. Werwath developed a new curriculum "to equip the student in college-level engineering standards needed for the degree award combined with parallel hands-on training." At the same time the academic calendar called the "quarter system" was implemented. This allowed for students to graduate with collegiate engineering degrees in 3 years, or 4 if they chose not to take the summer quarter. In the summer of 1919, 52 Bachelor's degree graduates as well as 11 faculty were offered admission to the American Institute of Electrical Engineers. Enrollment surpassed 1,200 in 1928, the school's 25th anniversary.

During the Great Depression when enrollment dropped, the school created a student financial fund for disadvantaged students. By 1933 enrollment had recovered to previous levels. On July 13, 1932, the School of Engineering was restructured through a charter revision and renamed Milwaukee School of Engineering. This allowed the formation of the Board of Regents, a group of industrial and community leaders to oversee management of the school. One of the first major actions of the board was to purchase the German-English Academy building. In 1935 the board established the Industrial Research Institute, where students and faculty could partner with nearby industries for work.

MSOE received the official seal of approval from the Society for the Promotion of Engineering in 1943, as part of recognition for educational achievements. The following year, MSOE also became a charter member of the National Council of Technical Schools. For the first time, the university started accepting females into its program in order to replace males who were drafted into World War II. Following the end of the war enrollment swelled in 1946 and 1947 due to the GI Bill of Rights allowing returning service personnel to pursue a college education. By 1947 over 90% of the students were veterans. On March 20, 1948, Oscar Werwath died and his sons, Karl Werwath and Heinz Werwath became president and treasurer, respectively. Milwaukee School of Engineering has a total undergraduate enrollment of 2,675, with a gender distribution of 74 percent male students and 26 percent female students.

Obtaining full institutional accreditation from the North Central Association of Colleges and Secondary Schools (NCA) began in 1950, and approval of accreditation was granted in 1971. By the time of the school's 50th anniversary in 1953, enrollment reached 2,300 students from 48 states and 30 foreign countries. With the beginning of the Space Race as well as emphasis on technological education, many classes at MSOE upgraded their technology and their programs. The school partnered with WISN-TV and WISN (AM) to create programming centered around science and promoting their school.

MSOE's logo was designed by industrial engineer Brooks Stevens's firm for the school's 1978 diamond jubilee.

=== Presidents ===
- Oscar Werwath, 1903–1948
- Karl Werwath, 1948–1977
- Robert R. Spitzer, 1977–1991
- Hermann Viets, 1991–2015
- John Walz, 2016–2025
- Eric T. Baumgartner, 2026-present

== Campus ==
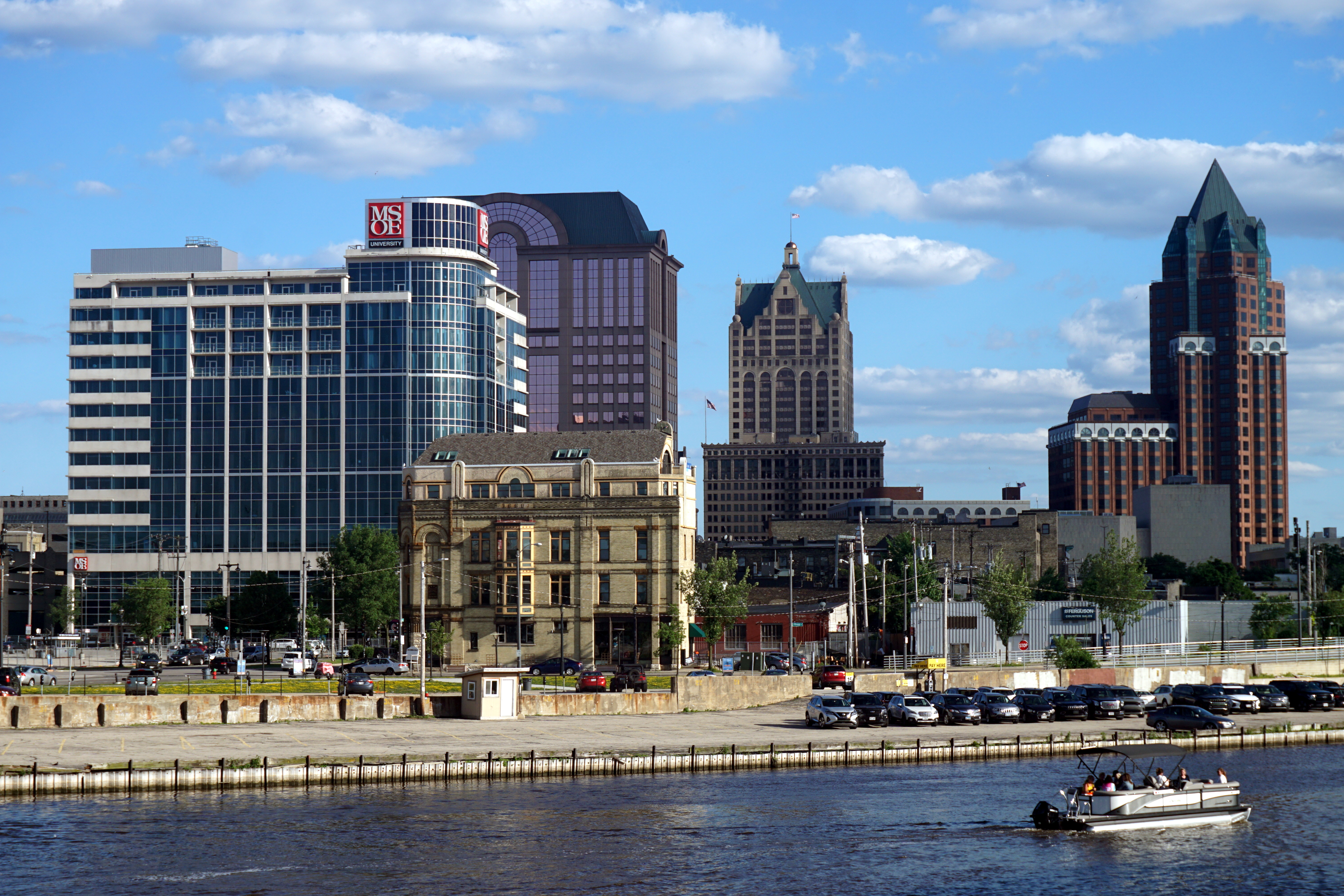
Grohmann Tower (left) viewed from the Milwaukee River

MSOE's campus, which occupies 22 acres (0.089 km^{2}) in the East Town neighborhood of downtown Milwaukee, Wisconsin, is spread over several blocks. MSOE has one of the smallest campuses in Wisconsin; only the Milwaukee Institute of Art and Design (MIAD) has a smaller campus (2 acres (0.0081 km^{2})).

The buildings on campus vary in age, with most being built in the mid-20th century. The oldest building on campus is the Alumni Partnership Center, formerly the Valentin Blatz Brewing Company Office Building, built in 1890 and the newest being Diercks Hall, completed in 2019. Several of the buildings on campus use the iconic Cream City brick, which is used in many other buildings in Milwaukee.

=== Academic facilities ===
Walter Schroeder Library

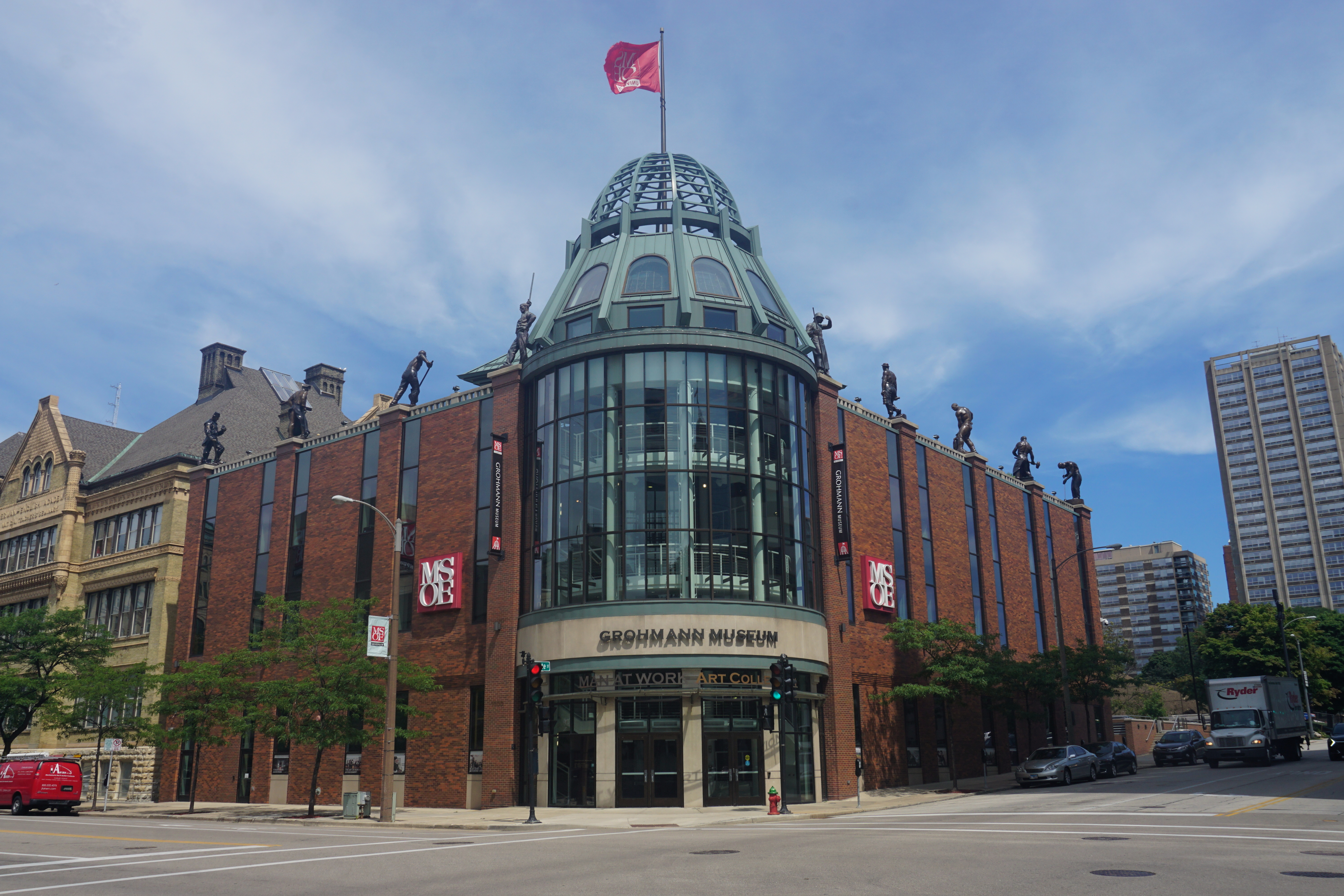
Grohmann Museum

Allen Bradley Hall of Science was acquired and renovated in 1958, formerly a parking garage. Allen-Bradley provided much of the funding and equipment for the building and was thus obtained the naming rights. It houses electrical engineering, biomedical engineering, and mechanical engineering, as well as the physics and chemistry departments. The Fred Loock Engineering Center was opened in 1967, and was designed by Fitzhugh Scott. It is an extension of the Allen Bradley Hall of Science. The building houses several laboratories and classrooms for use of many engineering departments.

The major library on campus is the Walter Schroeder Library. Dedicated in 1980 by Gerald Ford, the library is named after Wisconsin magnate Walter Schroeder and has the mathematics as well as the electrical engineering and computer science faculty offices.

Most of the administration buildings are located in Student Life and Campus Center, which was acquired from Blatz Brewery in 1987. The department of civil and architectural engineering and construction management (CAECM) have their faculty offices here as well. Recently added was the Ruehlow Nursing Complex, a multimillion-dollar upgrade for the School of Nursing. Many student resources such as the bookstore, a marketplace, and the student union called the "Great Room" are also here.

Rosenberg Hall, home to MSOE's Rader School of Business, was dedicated in 2003. Funds for the project were provided by alumnus Kenneth Rosenberg and his wife Doris. The hall contains classrooms, labs and faculty offices and the Milwaukee U.S. Export Assistance Center.

In 2006, MSOE acquired the former Federal Reserve Bank of Chicago and renovated it for use as The Grohmann Museum to house the Man at Work: The Eckhart G. Grohmann Collection, classrooms, and faculty offices for the humanities and psychology departments.

Construction of the Dwight and Dian Diercks Computational Science Hall began in early 2018. The building opened in September 2019.

=== Athletic facilities ===
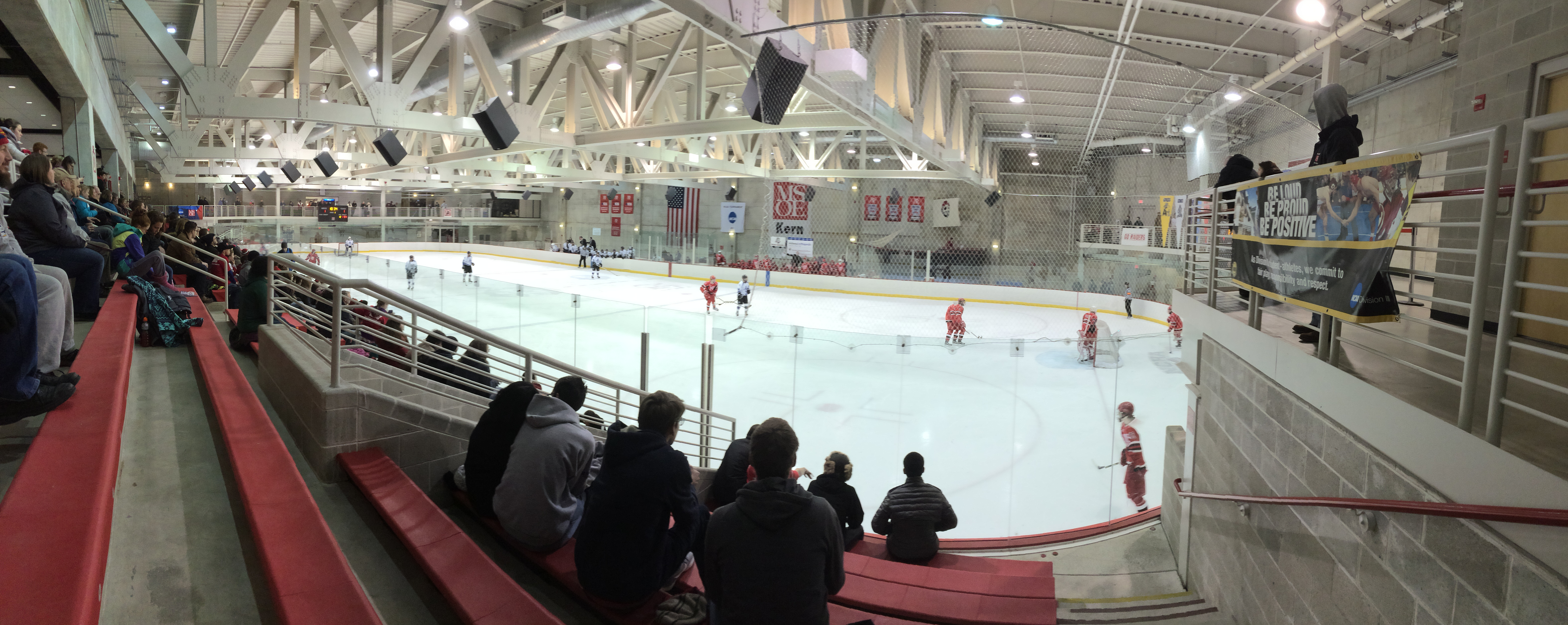
Kern Center Ice Arena

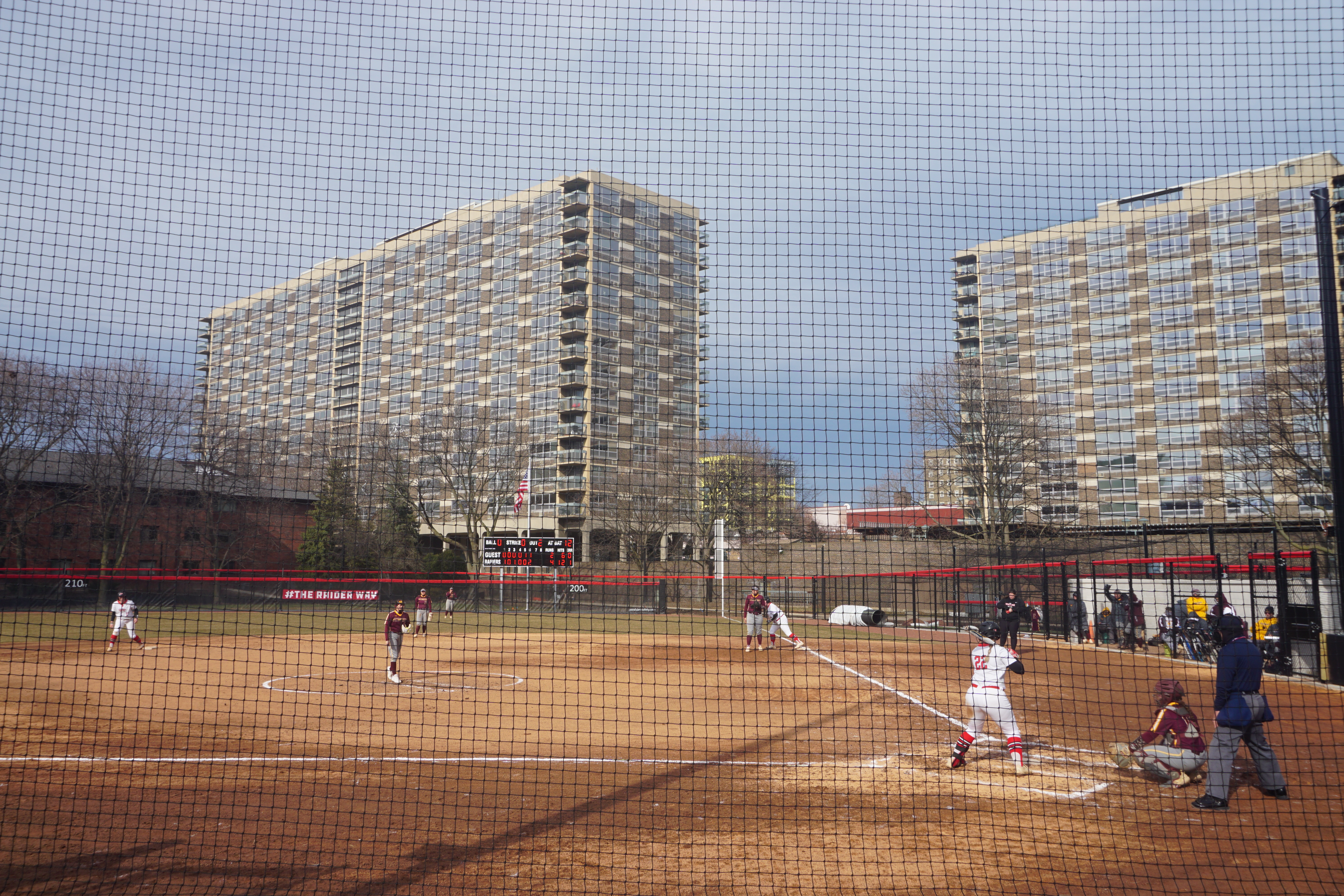
Raiders Field

In 2004, MSOE's 210,000-square-foot (20,000 m^{2}) Kern Center was completed, adding a hockey arena, basketball arena, fitness center, running track, and field house to its campus. MSOE's Kern Center houses many of the sports teams' facilities, as well as offering recreational areas for students, faculty and alumni. It also has classrooms, and houses the physical and mental wellness centers.

In 2013, MSOE completed construction on a new athletic field and parking complex called Pamela and Hermann Viets Field. The athletic field was built on top of an in-ground parking facility immediately north of the Kern Center.

In 2023, MSOE completed construction on a $2,935,000 stadium for Women's Softball. MSOE Raiders Field is a natural grass and dirt field with seating for 250 spectators. Additionally, the project allowed for new offices for coaches and new women's locker rooms in the Kern Center and Viets Field.

=== Residence halls ===
Undergraduates may live in one of four residence halls, but incoming freshman may live only in Hermann Viets Memorial Tower (VT), Margaret Loock Residence Hall (MLH), or Regents Residence Hall (RGN). Hermann Viets Tower was built utilizing the Roy W. Johnson Residence Hall (RWJ) as a substructure; with the original RWJ having been completed in 1965, and the renovations which brought about the name change occurring in 2020. MLH & RGN were constructed in 1967 and 1990 respectively. VT & MLH are traditional residence halls; while Regents Hall and Grohmann Tower is arranged apartment style.

Upperclassman, as well as international, graduate and married students may elect to reside in Grohmann Tower, although none of the aforementioned students are required to live on campus by MSOE policy.

Meals are served by American Dining Creations, which operates a dining facility in the Campus Center (CC).

== Academics ==
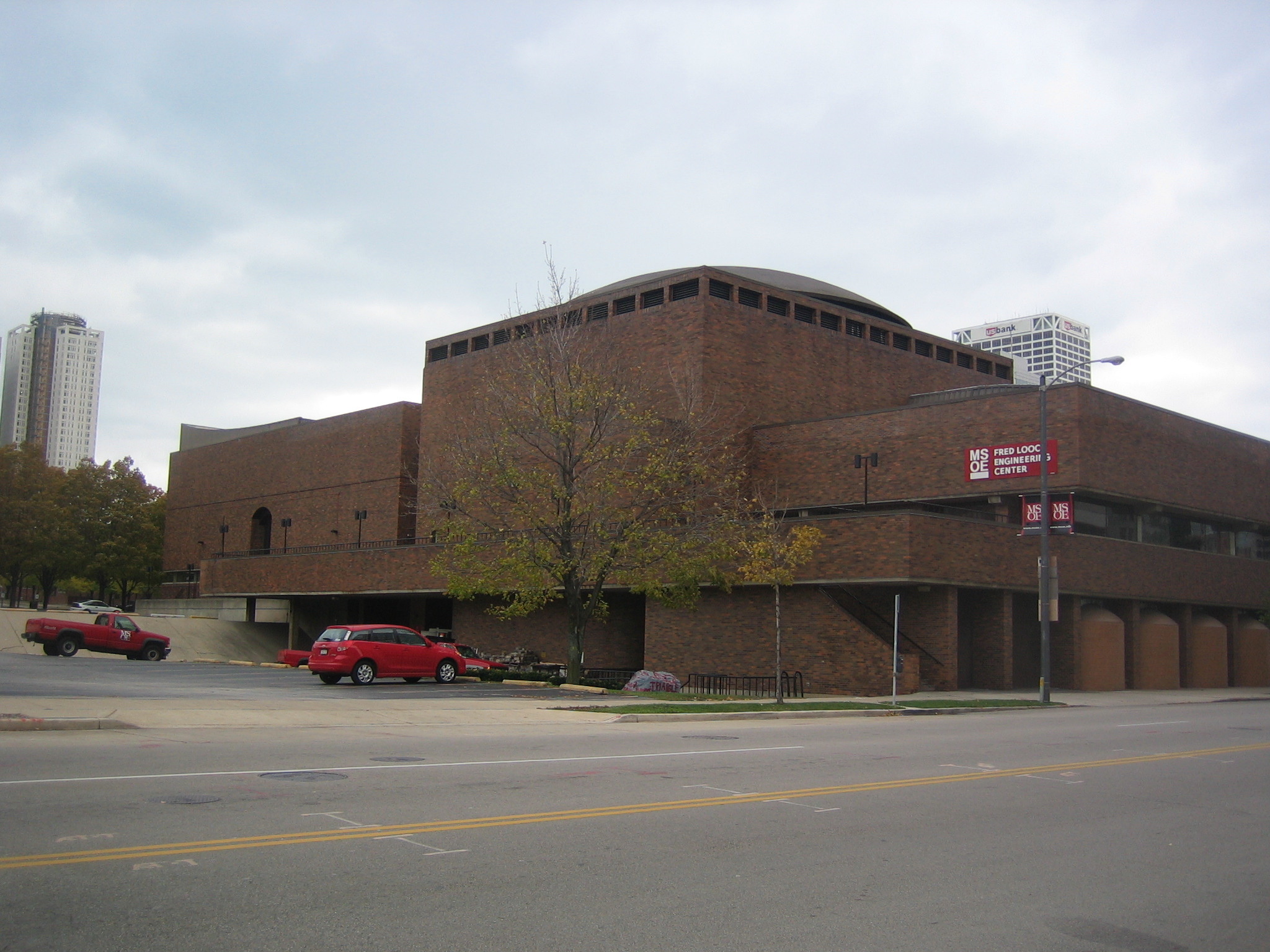
Fred Loock Engineering Center

The curricula at MSOE are centered on engineering, business, mathematics, nursing, and cardiovascular perfusion. MSOE's primary focus is on undergraduate education, where it has 8 academic departments and offers 16 undergraduate majors. MSOE mainly offers ABET-accredited Bachelor of Science degree to undergraduate students, as well as a Bachelor of Science in user experience. MSOE also has 9 post-graduate master's programs. As of 2019, MSOE had 157 full-time faculty members, 82% of whom hold a doctoral degree. Professors teach all courses; teaching assistants are not used. The student to faculty ratio is 15:1.

MSOE has full-time Bachelor of Science programs in engineering, including two-year transfer programs. It also confers master's degrees. In 2016, MSOE had a four-year graduation rate of 44%.

MSOE is accredited by the Higher Learning Commission. The architectural engineering, biomolecular engineering, biomedical engineering, computer engineering, electrical engineering, electrical engineering technology, engineering, industrial engineering, mechanical engineering, mechanical engineering technology, and software engineering programs are accredited by The Accreditation Board for Engineering and Technology (ABET). The nursing program is accredited by the Commission on Collegiate Nursing Education (CCNE). The construction management is accredited by the American Council for Construction Education (ACCE). The Master of Science in perfusion is accredited by the Commission on Accreditation of Allied Health Education Programs (CAAHEP).

=== Admissions ===
Undergraduate admission is described by U.S. News & World Report as "more selective". Princeton Review gave the university an admissions selectivity rating of 86. For the 2018–19 academic year the university received 3,294 applications; 63% were admitted. The admitted students’ academic profile showed 75% were in the top 50% of their high school class, SAT scores of 670 in evidence-based reading and writing, 700 in math. The average composite ACT score was around 28.

=== Reputation and rankings ===
Academic rankings

Master's
- Washington Monthly: 82

Regional
- U.S. News & World Report: 2

National
- Forbes: 326
- WSJ/College Pulse: 401–500

According to U.S. News & World Report's 2020 "Best Regional Universities Midwest Rankings," MSOE is rated eighth overall, sixth in "Best Colleges for Veterans", tied for eighth in "Most Innovative Schools", ninth for "Best Value Schools", and tied for 88th in "Top Performers on Social Mobility". U.S. News & World Report also ranked MSOE ninth among undergraduate engineering programs nationwide that do not offer doctorates, with program rankings of fourth (tie) in computer engineering, fifth in electrical engineering, 11th in civil engineering, and 11th in mechanical engineering.

In 2016 MSOE was listed among Princeton Review's 159 best Midwestern colleges.

=== MSOE Guarantee ===
The Milwaukee School of Engineering operates on a four-quarter system year-round, with its academic terms lasting ten weeks each. Most of the programs use a track system that outlines what courses students should take and pass for each term in order to graduate in four years. Freshmen usually take four courses per term and upperclassmen five. The MSOE Guarantee states that for a student starting and staying on track, all classes needed for graduation will be available when they need them so that they may graduate in four years. Despite this guarantee, MSOE maintains a four-year graduation rate of only 42% in 2013.

=== Study abroad programs ===
MSOE has study abroad exchange agreements with five universities: the Czech Technical University (CTU) in Prague, Czech Republic; Lille Catholic University in Lille, France; the Technische Hochschule Lübeck in Lübeck, Germany; the Florence University of the Arts in Florence, Italy; and Victoria University of Wellington in New Zealand. All courses are taught in English.

== Athletics ==
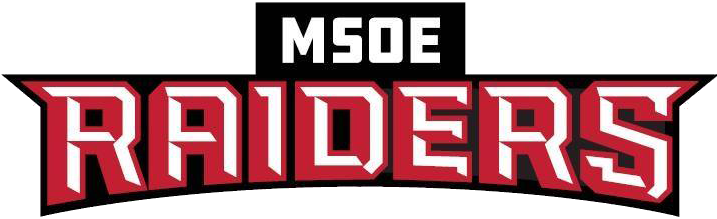
Milwaukee Raiders wordmark

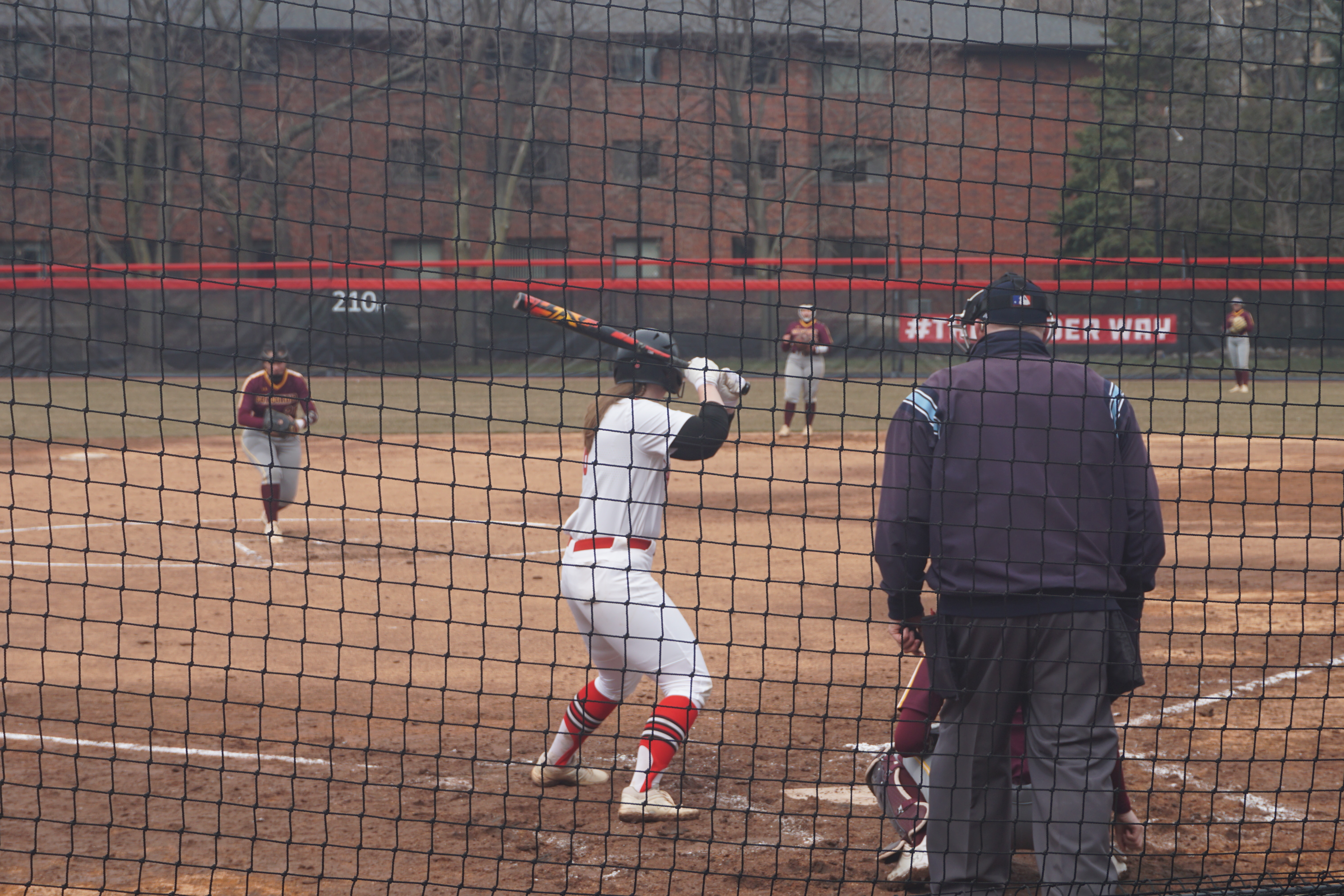
The MSOE softball team (in white) in action against the Concordia Cougars

MSOE's 21 athletic teams (nicknamed Raiders) compete in NCAA Division III. MSOE competes in the Northern Athletics Collegiate Conference (NACC) for most sports, including seven women's sports.

Men's ice hockey competes in the Northern Collegiate Hockey Association (NCHA), men's lacrosse in the Midwest Lacrosse Conference (MLC), men's volleyball in the Midwest Collegiate Volleyball League (MCVL), and wrestling in the Northern Wrestling Association (NWA). Men's rowing is not sponsored by the NCAA, so MSOE competes against all collegiate teams. MSOE also has club and intramural sports.

The school colors are red and white, and the mascot is a raider named "Roscoe".

== Notable alumni ==
- Michael J. Barber (1982, EE), chief diversity officer of General Electric
- Rudy Bozak, audio electronics and acoustics designer
- Frederick W. Cords Jr., electrical engineer and member of the Wisconsin State Assembly
- Tom Determann, member of the Iowa House of Representatives
- James I. Finley (1968, EE), former Deputy Under Secretary of Defense for Acquisition and Technology
- Eric E. Hagedorn, electrical engineer and member of the Wisconsin State Assembly
- Thomas A. Hauke, member of the Wisconsin State Assembly
- Jim Demetro, sculptor
- Carl Kiekhaefer (c. 1925, no degree), former owner of Mercury Marine and NASCAR team owner
- Anthony B. Rewald, electrical engineer and member of the Wisconsin State Assembly
- Harout O. Sanasarian, (1961, no degree) member of the Wisconsin State Assembly
- J. Richard Steffy, nautical archaeologist
- Norman Sussman, member of the Wisconsin Senate
- Gale J. Young, pioneer of nuclear engineering and namesake of the Eckart-Young theorem in linear algebra

== See also ==
- Association of Independent Technological Universities
