= List of NCAA conferences =

The National Collegiate Athletic Association (NCAA) is divided into three divisions based on scholarship allocation. Each division is made up of several conferences for regional league competition. Unless otherwise noted, changes in conference affiliation will occur on July 1 of the given year.

== Division I ==
Under NCAA regulations, all Division I conferences defined as "multisport conferences" must meet the following criteria:

- A total of at least seven active Division I members.
- Separate from the above, at least seven active Division I members that sponsor both men's and women's basketball.
- Sponsorship of at least 12 NCAA Division I sports.
- Minimum of six men's sports, with the following additional restrictions:
  - Men's basketball is a mandatory sport, and at least seven members must sponsor that sport.
  - Non-football conferences must sponsor at least two men's team sports other than basketball.
  - At least six members must sponsor five men's sports other than basketball, including either football or two other team sports.
- Minimum of six women's sports, with the following additional restrictions:
  - Women's basketball is a mandatory sport, with at least seven members sponsoring that sport.
  - At least two other women's team sports must be sponsored.
  - At least six members must sponsor five women's sports other than basketball, including two other team sports. If a conference officially sponsors an NCAA "emerging sport" for women (as of 2026–27, equestrianism, flag football, rugby union, or triathlon), that sport will be counted if five members (instead of six) sponsor it.

Schools in all divisions that sponsor athletic programs for only one sex/gender need only meet the sports sponsorship requirements for that sex/gender.

=== Football Bowl Subdivision ===
Conferences in the Football Bowl Subdivision must meet a more stringent set of NCAA requirements than other conferences. Among these additional NCAA regulations, Football Bowl Subdivision conferences must be "multisport", with institutions participating in conference play in at least six men's and eight women's sports, including football, men's and women's basketball, and at least two other women's team sports. Each school may count one men's and one women's sport not sponsored by its primary conference towards these limits, as long as that sport competes in another Division I conference. The men's and women's sports so counted need not be the same sport.

Conference	Nickname	Founded	Members	Sports	Headquarters	Map
American Conference	American	2013 (Note: Known as Big East Conference prior to 2013. The American operates under the original 1979 Big East charter, but considers its competitive history to have started in 2013.)	13 (Note: 13 full members with Wichita State as a non-football member; 14 football members with Army and Navy as football-only affiliates.: 14 full members and 15 football members in 2027 with addition of James Madison.)	22	Irving, Texas	
Atlantic Coast Conference	ACC	1953	18 (Note: 18 full members, 17 football members. Notre Dame football is an FBS independent, but has a substantial cross-scheduling agreement with the ACC.)	28	Charlotte, North Carolina	
Big Ten Conference	Big Ten; B1G	1896	18	28	Rosemont, Illinois	
Big 12 Conference	Big 12; B12	1996	16	25	Irving, Texas	
Conference USA	CUSA	1995	10	18	Dallas, Texas	
Division I FBS independents (Note: Note that "independents" is not a conference; it is simply a designation used for schools whose football programs do not play in any conference. All of these schools have conference memberships for other sports.)	Ind.	N/A	2	1	N/A	
Mid-American Conference	MAC	1946	12 (Note: 12 full members and 13 football members)	23	Cleveland, Ohio	
Mountain West Conference	MW; MWC	1999	10 (Note: 10 full members; 8 full members playing MW football, 2 non-football-playing full members, 2 football affiliates.)	18	Las Vegas, Nevada (Note: More specifically in the unincorporated community of Enterprise. All unincorporated locations in the Las Vegas Valley have a Las Vegas mailing address.)	
Pac-12 Conference	Pac-12; P12	1959 (Note: Pacific Coast Conference chartered in 1915; current charter formed in 1959 by four former PCC members, with a fifth joining later in 1959 and three others joining by 1964.)	9 (Note: 9 full members and 8 football members)	19	San Ramon, California	
Southeastern Conference	SEC; SE; Southeastern	1932	16	22	Birmingham, Alabama	
Sun Belt Conference	SBC; SB; Sun Belt	1976	14 (Note: 13 members in 2027 with loss of James Madison.)	20	New Orleans, Louisiana	

=== Football Championship Subdivision ===
Unlike in the Football Bowl Subdivision, Football Championship Subdivision conferences are allowed to be single-sport, only sponsoring football. Multisport conferences in the Football Championship Subdivision must still meet the general NCAA Division I requirements regarding the minimum number of men's and women's sports in addition to competing in football (see above).

Conference	Nickname	Founded	Full Members	Sports	Headquarters	Map
Big Sky Conference	Big Sky; BSC	1963	11 (Note: 11 full members and 13 football members with Cal Poly and UC Davis as football-only affiliates.)	16	Ogden, Utah	
Coastal Athletic Association Football Conference	CAA Football	2007 (Note: While CAA Football was formally founded in 2007, its history can be traced back decades earlier.: The earliest predecessor is the New England Conference, which existed from 1938–1947. However, CAA Football does not recognize this league as part of its history.; In 1947, four New England Conference members joined with other schools to form the Yankee Conference under a new charter. CAA Football considers its history to have started with the Yankee Conference.; The Yankee Conference, by then a football-only league, was taken over by the Atlantic 10 Conference after the 1996 football season.; The all-sports CAA took over A-10 football in 2007, forming CAA Football as a separate entity.)	13 (Note: CAA Football is a separate entity from the multi-sports CAA.)	1	Richmond, Virginia	
Division I FCS Independents (Note: Note that "Independents" is not a conference; it is simply a designation used for schools whose football programs do not play in any conference. These schools have conference memberships for other sports.)			2 (Note: 1 independent in 2027 with Chicago State joining NEC football.)	1		
Ivy League	Ivy League	1954 (Note: While the Ivy League considers its athletic conference to have been established in 1954, the history of the athletic league can be traced back decades earlier: In 1901, the Eastern Intercollegiate Basketball League (EIBL) was formed by five schools that would later become part of the current Ivy League; the EIBL membership eventually became identical to that of the future all-sports league. The EIBL was directly absorbed into the all-sports Ivy League, which considers the EIBL to be part of its history.; In 1945, the Ivy Group Agreement, which governed competition and policies among the Ivy schools in football, was signed by all eight schools that eventually formed the all-sports league.; The official formation of the athletic Ivy League came in 1954, when the Ivy Group Agreement was extended to cover all sports.; For more details, see the section on the history of the athletic Ivy League.)	8	33 (Note: Number of sports in which Ivy League championships are awarded, with the following caveats: Championships are awarded in the non-NCAA sports of men's rowing plus men's and women's squash.; While championships are awarded in men's and women's ice hockey, no Ivy League tournaments are held. All Ivy ice hockey members compete in ECAC Hockey for that league's automatic NCAA tournament bids. Ivy champions are extrapolated from regular-season results of ECAC games that involve two Ivy teams.)	Princeton, New Jersey	
Mid-Eastern Athletic Conference	MEAC	1970	8 (Note: 8 full members, 6 football members.)	16	Norfolk, Virginia	
Missouri Valley Football Conference	MVFC	1985 (Note: While the MVFC began football competition in 1985, the conference charter dates to 1982. See History of the Missouri Valley Football Conference for more details.)	9	1	St. Louis, Missouri	
NEC (Note: Media outlets still generally use the former name of "Northeast Conference".)	NEC	1981	9 (Note: 9 full members, 7 football members with Chicago State, Fairleigh Dickinson, and Le Moyne as non-football members and with Duquesne and Robert Morris as football-only affiliates.: 7 full members, 6 or 7 football members in 2027 with the following: Addition of Chicago State football.; Departure of non-football Le Moyne and football-sponsoring Stonehill. The latter's football affiliation beyond 2026 is currently unknown.)	25	Somerset, New Jersey	
Ohio Valley Conference	OVC	1948	9 (Note: 9 full members, 8 football members. Full member Morehead State plays football in the Pioneer Football League; Charleston Southern and Gardner–Webb are football affiliates.)	19	Brentwood, Tennessee	
Patriot League	Patriot	1986	10 (Note: 10 full members and 10 football members with Army, Navy, American, Boston, and Loyola (MD) as non-football members (Army and Navy both compete in FBS football) and with Fordham, Georgetown, Richmond, Villanova, and William & Mary as football as football-only affiliates.)	24	Center Valley, Pennsylvania	
Pioneer Football League	PFL	1991	11	1	St. Louis, Missouri	
Southern Conference	SoCon	1921	11 (Note: 11 full members, 10 football members.)	20	Spartanburg, South Carolina	
Southland Conference	Southland; SLC	1963	12 (Note: 12 full members, 10 football members.)	18	Frisco, Texas	
Southwestern Athletic Conference	SWAC	1920	12	18	Birmingham, Alabama	
United Athletic Conference (Note: Not to be confused with the football-only United Athletic Conference that operated in the 2023–2025 seasons as an alliance between the Atlantic Sun Conference and Western Athletic Conference (WAC). In 2026, the football league was incorporated into the WAC, which rebranded as the UAC.)	UAC	1962 (Note: Reflects the founding date of the WAC.)	9 (Note: 9 full members, 8 football members. Full members Little Rock and UT Arlington do not play football; West Florida is a football-only member.)	16	Jacksonville, Florida (Note: Headquarters of Unisun Sports, a joint venture between the UAC and ASUN that provides the administrative structure for both conferences.)	

=== Non-football, multi-sport conferences ===
Multisport conferences that do not compete in football must still meet the general NCAA Division I requirements regarding the minimum number of men's and women's sports (see above).

Conference	Nickname	Founded	Members	Sports	Headquarters	Map
America East Conference	America East; AmEast	1979	9	18	Boston, Massachusetts	
Atlantic Sun Conference	ASUN	1978	8	22	Jacksonville, Florida	
Atlantic 10 Conference	A-10	1975	14	22	Newport News, Virginia	
Big East Conference	Big East	1979 (Note: Although the charter of the current Big East dates only to the 2013 split of the original Big East, both the current Big East and the American Conference claim 1979 as their founding dates. The current Big East maintains the pre-split history of the original conference in all sports that it sponsors. Neither conference recognizes the history of the original Big East in football (currently sponsored by the American but not the present Big East) or rowing (formerly sponsored by the American and never sponsored by the current Big East).)	11	23 (Note: 22 NCAA-sanctioned sports, plus the non-NCAA and fully coeducational esports.)	New York City, New York	
Big South Conference	Big South	1983	9	19 (Note: 20 sports in 2027 with addition of women's flag football.)	Charlotte, North Carolina	
Big West Conference	Big West; BWC	1969	12 (Note: 10 members in 2027 with loss of UC San Diego and UC Santa Barbara.)	21	Irvine, California	
Coastal Athletic Association	CAA	1983	13 (Note: The CAA Football Conference is a separate entity from the all-sports CAA.) (Note: 14 members in 2027 with addition of Fairfield.)	23	Richmond, Virginia	
Horizon League	Horizon	1979	12	19	Indianapolis, Indiana	
Independents			–			
Metro Conference	Metro	1980	13 (Note: 12 members in 2027 with loss of Fairfield.)	25 (Note: 23 NCAA-sanctioned sports plus two non-NCAA sports—men's rowing, and esports, which are fully coeducational.)	Edison, New Jersey	
Missouri Valley Conference	MVC; The Valley	1907	11	18	St. Louis, Missouri	
Mountain Pacific Sports Federation	MPSF	1992	68 (Note: No more than 19 schools are competing in any one of the MPSF's sports in 2026–27.)	18 (Note: Sponsors 16 fully recognized NCAA sports (two of which feature only Division II members) and 2 non-NCAA sports (artistic swimming and men's rowing).)	Woodland, California	
Summit League	Summit	1982	8	19	Sioux Falls, South Dakota	
West Coast Conference	WCC	1952	10 (Note: 12 members in 2027 with addition of UC San Diego and UC Santa Barbara.)	16	San Bruno, California	

=== Ice hockey conferences ===
Division I ice hockey has a different conference structure than the above multisport conferences. These schools have memberships in other conferences for other sports.

Conference	Nickname	Founded	Members (Men/Women)	Headquarters	Map
Atlantic Hockey America	Atlantic Hockey; AHA	1997 (Note: The Atlantic Hockey Association and College Hockey America merged in 2024 to form Atlantic Hockey America. Atlantic Hockey was founded (as the MAAC) in 1997 and the CHA in 1999.)	14 (9/7)	Haverhill, Massachusetts	
Central Collegiate Hockey Association	CCHA	2020 (Note: Founded in 2020, with play starting in 2021, as the revival of an earlier CCHA that existed from 1971 to 2013; the current CCHA considers itself a continuation of the original. Bowling Green, which was a member of the original CCHA for its entire existence and is a charter member of the revived conference, maintained rights to the league name.)	8 (8/none)	Farmington Hills, Michigan	
ECAC Hockey	ECAC	1962	12 (12/12)	Albany, New York	
Hockey East	Hockey East; HEA	1984	12 (11/10)	Amesbury, Massachusetts	
Independents			6 (6/none) (Note: Tentatively 7 independents in 2027 with addition of Maryville (MO).)		
New England Women's Hockey Alliance	NEWHA	2018 (Note: Established as a scheduling alliance in 2017, officially organized as a conference in 2018, and officially recognized by the NCAA in 2019.)	8 (none/8)	Winthrop, Massachusetts	
National Collegiate Hockey Conference	NCHC	2011 (Note: Although founded in 2011, the NCHC did not begin play until 2013.)	9 (10/none)	Colorado Springs, Colorado	
Western Collegiate Hockey Association	WCHA	1951 (Note: Founded in 1951 as a men's-only conference; women's play began in 1999. The men's side of the WCHA folded after the 2020–21 season, with most of its members forming the revived CCHA.)	8 (none/8)	Edina, Minnesota	

=== Other single-sport conferences ===
This list includes conferences in sports that the NCAA does not fully split into divisions, such as men's volleyball and rifle. Sports in which the NCAA sponsors separate championships for men and women are officially treated by the NCAA as two separate sports.

Conference	Nickname	Founded	Members	Sport	Headquarters	Map
Central Collegiate Fencing Conference	CCFC		6	Fencing	?	
Central Collegiate Ski Association	CCSA	2009	7 (Note: There are 7 NCAA varsity members; the conference also has one junior college member.)	Skiing	?	
Collegiate Water Polo Association	CWPA	1970s	26 (Note: 9 schools have both men's & women's varsity teams, 9 have men's varsity teams only, 8 have women's varsity teams only; additionally, there are 136 men's and 86 women's club teams.)	water polo	Bridgeport, Pennsylvania	
East Atlantic Gymnastics League	EAGL	1995	7	gymnastics	?	
Eastern Association of Rowing Colleges	EARC	?	18	rowing	Danbury, Connecticut	
Eastern Association of Women's Rowing Colleges	EAWRC	?	18	rowing	Danbury, Connecticut	
Eastern Intercollegiate Gymnastics League	EIGL	?	5	1 (gymnastics)	Danbury, Connecticut	
Eastern Intercollegiate Ski Association	EISA	?	15	1 (Skiing)	?	
Eastern Intercollegiate Volleyball Association	EIVA	1977	7	1 (Men's volleyball)	Bronxville, New York	
Eastern Intercollegiate Wrestling Association	EIWA	1905	17	1 (wrestling)	?	
Eastern Women's Fencing Conference	EWFC	2000	7	1 (fencing)	?	
Golden Coast Conference	GCC	2013 (Note: Women only. The GCC was founded in 2013 as a women's-only conference; a men's division was added in 2016 and shut down in 2023.)	8 (Note: 5 members in 2027 with loss of Fresno State, San Diego State, and San Jose State.)	1 (water polo)	?	
Great America Rifle Conference	GARC	1998	9	1 (rifle)	?	
Gymnastics East Conference	GEC	2021	8	1 (Women's gymnastics)	?	
Intercollegiate Fencing Conference of Southern California.	IFCSC	1996?	2 (Note: There are 2 varsity members; the conference also has 7 college club members.)	1 (fencing)	?	
Mid-Atlantic Collegiate Fencing Association	MACFA	1952	8 (Note: There are 8 varsity members; the conference also has 7 college club members.)	1 (fencing)	Hackettstown, New Jersey	
Mid-Atlantic Rifle Conference	MAC	1978	7 (Note: There are 7 varsity members; the conference also has 6 college club members.)	1 (rifle)	?	
Mid-Atlantic Water Polo Conference	MAWPC		7	1 (Water polo)	?	
Midwest Fencing Conference	MFC	1968	6 (Note: There are 6 varsity members; the conference also has 13 college club members.)	1 (fencing)	?	
Midwest Independent Conference	MIC	?	6	1 (women's gymnastics)	UIC (?)	
Midwestern Intercollegiate Volleyball Association	MIVA	1961	9	1 (Men's volleyball)	Columbus, Ohio	
National Intercollegiate Women's Fencing Association	NIWFA	1929	10 (Note: There are 10 varsity members; the conference also has 10 college club members.)	1 (fencing)	?	
New England Intercollegiate Fencing Conference	NEIFC	?	8 (Note: There are 8 varsity members; the conference also has 13 college club members.)	1 (fencing)	?	
Northeast Fencing Conference	NFC	1992	8 (Note: There are 8 varsity members; the conference also has 5 college club members.)	1 (fencing)	?	
Pacific Collegiate Swim and Dive Conference	PCSC	2002	9 (men); 15 (women)	1 (swimming)	?	
Patriot Rifle Conference	PRC	2013	6	1 (rifle)	Colorado Springs, Colorado	
Rocky Mountain Intercollegiate Ski Association	RMISA	1950	6 (Note: There are 6 varsity members; the conference also has 4 college club members.)	1 (Skiing)	?	
Western Water Polo Association	WWPA	1981	7 (men) (Note: 6 men's members and 7 women's members in 2027 with loss of affiliate Salem University.); 8 (women)	1 (water polo)	?	

== Division II ==
Among the NCAA regulations, Division II institutions have to sponsor at least five sports for men and five for women (or four for men and six for women), with two team sports for each sex, and each playing season represented by each sex. Teams that consist of both men and women are counted as men's teams for sports sponsorship purposes.

=== Current conferences ===
Conferences that sponsor football are highlighted in yellow.

Conference	Nickname	Founded	Members	Sports	Headquarters	Map
California Collegiate Athletic Association	CCAA	1938	14 (Note: 15 members in 2027 with return of Sonoma State.)	13	Walnut Creek, California	
Central Atlantic Collegiate Conference	CACC	1961	11 (Note: 12 members in 2027 with addition of Monroe.)	16	New Haven, Connecticut	
Central Intercollegiate Athletic Association	CIAA	1912	13 (Note: 13 full members; 12 football members.)	15	Hampton, Virginia	
Conference Carolinas	CC	1930	16 (Note: 16 full members, 7 football members.)	26 (Note: 25 NCAA championship sports plus women's flag football, currently part of the NCAA Emerging Sports for Women program.)	Greenville, South Carolina	
East Coast Conference	ECC	1989	9	19	Central Islip, New York	
Great American Conference	GAC	2011	12	16	Russellville, Arkansas	
Great Lakes Intercollegiate Athletic Conference	GLIAC	1972	11 (Note: 11 full members, 8 football members.)	21	Bay City, Michigan	
Great Lakes Valley Conference	GLVC	1978	15 (Note: 15 full members, 9 football members.)	26	Indianapolis, Indiana	
Great Midwest Athletic Conference	G-MAC	2011	13 (Note: 13 full members, 10 football members.)	25	Greenwood, Indiana	
Great Northwest Athletic Conference	GNAC	2001	10 (Note: 9 full members in 2027 with loss of Simon Fraser.)	15	Portland, Oregon	
Gulf South Conference	GSC	1970	11 (Note: 11 full members, 4 football members.: 11 members in 2027 with addition of Loyola (LA) and Spring Hill, and loss of Christian Brothers and Valdosta State.)	17	Birmingham, Alabama	
Division II independents			4 (Note: 4 all-sports independents (non-football), plus one football independent (Northeastern State).: 3 independents in 2027 with loss of Salem University.)			
Lone Star Conference	LSC	1931	18 (Note: 18 full members, 10 football members with Central Washington and Western Oregon as football-only affiliates.: 19 full members, 11 football members in 2027 with addition of Texas A&M–Texarkana.; 20 full members, 12 football members in 2028 with addition of Texas Wesleyan.)	19	Richardson, Texas	
Mid-America Intercollegiate Athletics Association	MIAA	1912	14 (Note: 14 full members, 10 football members with Northeastern State competing as a D-II Independent in football.)	19	Kansas City, Missouri	
Mountain East Conference	MEC	2012	12 (Note: 12 full members, 9 football members.)	23	Bridgeport, West Virginia	MountainEastConference2025
Northeast-10 Conference	NE-10	1980	10 (Note: 10 full members, 9 football members with Post as a football-only affiliate.: 9 full members, 9 football members in 2027 with addition of Monroe as football-only affiliate and loss of football-sponsoring full member Saint Anselm.)	23	Mansfield, Massachusetts	
Northern Sun Intercollegiate Conference	NSIC	1932	16 (Note: 16 full members, 14 football members.)	18	St. Paul, Minnesota	
Pacific West Conference	PacWest	1992	10	15	Newport Beach, California	
Peach Belt Conference	PBC	1990	11 (Note: 11 members in 2027 with loss of Flagler and addition of Valdosta State.)	15	Augusta, Georgia	
Pennsylvania State Athletic Conference	PSAC	1951	17 (Note: 17 full members, 15 football members.: 18 full members, 16 football members in 2027 with addition of Lackawanna.)	23	Lock Haven, Pennsylvania	
Rocky Mountain Athletic Conference	RMAC	1909	15 (Note: 15 full members, 10 football members.)	23	Colorado Springs, Colorado	
South Atlantic Conference	SAC	1975	13 (Note: 12 full members, 10 football members.)	20	Rock Hill, South Carolina	
Southern Intercollegiate Athletic Conference	SIAC	1913	15 (Note: 15 full members, 13 football members.: 14 members in 2027 with loss of Spring Hill.)	14	Tucker, Georgia	
Sunshine State Conference	SSC	1975	11 (Note: 12 members in 2027 with addition of Flagler.)	18	Melbourne, Florida	

=== Single-sport conferences ===
Conference	Nickname	Founded	Members	Sport	Headquarters	Map
Appalachian Swimming Conference	ASC	?	6 (men); 4 (women)	swimming	?	
players+ ECAC Division II Field Hockey League	ECAC	2014	6	field hockey	Danbury, Connecticut	
ECAC Division II Wrestling League	ECAC	2015	7	wrestling	Danbury, Connecticut	
New South Intercollegiate Swim Conference.	NSISC	1995	5 (men); 6 (women)	swimming	?	
Pacific Collegiate Swim and Dive Conference	PCSC	2003	9 (men); 15 (women)	swimming	?	

=== Other sports ===
These all-sports conferences sponsor sports which do not have D-II championships. Bowling will become a Division II championship sport in 2027–28; conferences affected by this change are highlighed in pink.

Conference	Nickname	Founded	Members (Note: Number reflects membership in the sport that lacks a D-II championship, not the number of full members.)	Sport	Headquarters	Map
Conference Carolinas	CC	1930	8	Men's volleyball	Greenville, South Carolina	
Conference Carolinas	CC	1930	11	Women's flag football (Note: Part of the NCAA Emerging Sports for Women program.)	Greenville, South Carolina	
Conference Carolinas	CC	1930	9	Women's wrestling	Greenville, South Carolina	
Central Atlantic Collegiate Conference	CACC	1961	6	Bowling	New Haven, Connecticut	
Central Intercollegiate Athletic Association	CIAA	1912	10	Bowling	Hampton, Virginia	
East Coast Conference	ECC	1989	10	Bowling	Central Islip, New York	
East Coast Conference	ECC	1989	5	Men's volleyball	Central Islip, New York	
Great Lakes Valley Conference	GLVC	1978	7	Bowling	Indianapolis, Indiana	
Great Lakes Valley Conference	GLVC	1978	7	Stunt	Indianapolis, Indiana	
Great Lakes Valley Conference	GLVC	1978	7	Men's volleyball	Indianapolis, Indiana	
Great Lakes Valley Conference	GLVC	1978	8	Women's wrestling	Indianapolis, Indiana	
Northeast-10 Conference	NE-10	1980	7	Men's ice hockey	South Easton, Massachusetts	
Rocky Mountain Athletic Conference	RMAC	1909	6 (Note: 5 members in 2027 with loss of affiliate Simon Fraser.)	Women's wrestling	Colorado Springs, Colorado	
Southern Intercollegiate Athletic Conference	SIAC	1913	7	Men's volleyball	Tucker, Georgia	

== Division III ==
Unlike the other two divisions, Division III institutions cannot offer athletic scholarships. Among the other NCAA Division III requirements, schools have sports sponsorship requirements set by the NCAA. All institutions, regardless of enrollment, must sponsor at least three team sports for each sex/gender, and each playing season represented by each sex/gender.

A sports sponsorship rule unique to Division III is that the total number of sports that must be sponsored differs by a school's full-time undergraduate enrollment. Schools with an enrollment of 1,000 or fewer must sponsor at least five sports for men and five for women; those with larger enrollments must sponsor six men's and six women's sports. As in the other divisions, teams that include both men and women are treated as men's sports for the purpose of these regulations.

=== Current conferences ===
Conferences that sponsor football highlighted in yellow.

Conference	Nickname	Founded	Members	Sports	Headquarters	Map
Allegheny Mountain Collegiate Conference	AMCC	1997	8	16	North Boston, New York	
American Rivers Conference	A-R-C	1922	8	22	Cedar Rapids, Iowa	
American Southwest Conference	ASC	1996	6	17	Richardson, Texas	
Atlantic East Conference	AEC	2018	6 (Note: The Atlantic East Conference will disband after 2026–27 season, with Centenary (NJ), Gwynedd Mercy, Immaculata, and Marymount University joining the United East Conference starting in 2027, while Pratt and Saint Elizabeth will join the City University of New York Athletic Conference also in 2027.)	21 (Note: 20 NCAA championship sports plus women's flag football, currently part of the NCAA Emerging Sports for Women program.)	Lancaster, Pennsylvania	
Centennial Conference	Centennial	1981	11 (Note: 11 full members, 7 football members.)	24	Lancaster, Pennsylvania	
City University of New York Athletic Conference (Note: Plans to adopt a new name in 2027.)	CUNYAC	1987	8 (Note: 10 members in 2027 with addition of Pratt and Saint Elizabeth.)	16	Flushing, Queens, New York	
Coast to Coast Athletic Conference	C2C	1989	8	19	Fredericksburg, Virginia	
College Conference of Illinois and Wisconsin	CCIW	1946	9 (Note: 9 full members, 9 football members with Washington (MO) as a football-only affiliate.: 10 full members, 10 football members in 2027 with addition of Concordia (WI).)	26	Naperville, Illinois	
Collegiate Conference of the South	CCS	2022	7	14	Atlanta, Georgia	
Conference of New England	CNE	1984	11 (Note: 11 members, 8 football members with Maine Maritime and New England College as football-only affiliates.)	22	Springfield, Massachusetts	
Empire 8	E8	1964	12 (Note: 12 full members with Elmira, Houghton, Keuka, Nazareth, Russell Sage, SUNY Geneseo, and SUNY Poly as non-football members; 8 football members with Hilbert, SUNY Cortland, and SUNY Morrisville as football-only affiliates.)	22	Rochester, New York	
Great Northeast Athletic Conference	GNAC	1995	14	17	Boston, Massachusetts	
Heartland Collegiate Athletic Conference	HCAC	1987	10 (Note: 10 full members, 7 football members.: 9 full members, 6 football members in 2027 with loss of Manchester (IN).)	16	Greenwood, Indiana	
Division III Independents			1 (Note: 1 all-sports independent (non-football), plus 1 football independent (which are member of a non-football conference).)			
Landmark Conference	Landmark	2006	10 (Note: 10 members with Drew, Elizabethtown, Goucher, and Scranton as non-football members and 7 football with Western Connecticut State as a football-only affiliate.)	23	Madison, New Jersey	
Liberty League	Liberty	1995	12 (Note: 12 full members, 7 football members with Buffalo State as a football-only affiliate.)	26	Troy, New York	
Little East Conference	LEC	1986	9	21	North Dartmouth, Massachusetts	
Massachusetts State Collegiate Athletic Conference	MASCAC	1971	8 (Note: 8 full members with MCLA and Salem State as non-football members, 9 football members with Dean, Plymouth State, and UMass Dartmouth as football affiliates.)	16	Westfield, Massachusetts	
Michigan Intercollegiate Athletic Association	MIAA	1888	9 (Note: 9 full members, 8 football members.)	22	Freeland, Michigan	
Middle Atlantic Conferences	MAC	1912	18 (Note: The MAC is actually an umbrella organization of three conferences. Nine schools are members of the MAC Commonwealth and nine others are members of the MAC Freedom. Each league conducts competition in the same set of 14 sports, not including football. The third league, called the Middle Atlantic Conference, combines schools from the MAC Commonwealth and MAC Freedom for 13 other sports, including football.) (Note: 18 full members (9 Commonwealth, 9 Freedom), 10 football members.)	27	Annville, Pennsylvania	
Midwest Conference	Midwest	1921	10 (Note: 10 full members, 11 football members with Chicago as a football affiliate.)	20	Ripon, Wisconsin	
Minnesota Intercollegiate Athletic Conference	MIAC	1920	13 (Note: 13 full members, 10 football members.)	22	St. Paul, Minnesota	
New England Small College Athletic Conference	NESCAC	1971	11 (Note: 11 full members, 10 football members.)	26	Hadley, Massachusetts	
New England Women's and Men's Athletic Conference	NEWMAC	1998	12 (Note: 12 full members, 8 football members.: 13 full members,9 football members in 2027 with addition of Saint Anselm.)	21	Wellesley, Massachusetts	
New Jersey Athletic Conference	NJAC	1985	10 (Note: 10 full members with Ramapo, Rutgers–Camden, Rutgers–Newark, and Stockton as non-football members; 7 football members with Christopher Newport and Salisbury as football affiliates.)	21	Pitman, New Jersey	
North Atlantic Conference	NAC	1996	8	15	Waterville, Maine	
North Coast Athletic Conference	NCAC	1983	9 (Note: 9 full members, 9 football members with addition of Washington (MO) as a football-only affiliate.)	23	Westlake, Ohio	
Northern Athletics Collegiate Conference	NACC	2006	13 (Note: 13 full members, 9 football members with Eureka as a football-only affiliate.: 12 full members, 8 football members in 2027 with loss of Concordia (WI).)	19	Waukesha, Wisconsin	
Northwest Conference	NWC	1926	9 (Note: 9 full members, 8 football members.)	20	Seattle, Washington	
Ohio Athletic Conference	OAC	1902	9	23	Austintown, Ohio	
Old Dominion Athletic Conference	ODAC	1976	14 (Note: 14 full members, 9 football members with Gallaudet as a football-only affiliate.)	26	Forest, Virginia	
Presidents' Athletic Conference	PAC	1955	13 (Note: 13 full members, 13 football members, with two full members not sponsoring football (Chatham and Franciscan) and two football affiliates (Carnegie Mellon and Case Western Reserve).)	24	Wexford, Pennsylvania	
St. Louis Intercollegiate Athletic Conference	SLIAC	1989	9	14	St. Louis, Missouri	
Skyline Conference	Skyline	1989	12	17	Lawrenceville, New Jersey	
Southern Athletic Association	SAA	2012	9 (Note: 9 full members, 8 football members with one full member not sponsoring football (Oglethorpe): 7 full members, 6 football members in 2027 with loss of Milsaps and Southwestern (TX).)	21	Atlanta, Georgia	
Southern California Intercollegiate Athletic Conference	SCIAC	1915	10 (Note: 10 full members, 8 football members.)	21	Los Angeles, California	
Southern Collegiate Athletic Conference	SCAC	1962	10 (Note: 10 full members, 6 football members with football-only affiliates Lyon and Gallaudet.: 12 full members, 8 football members in 2027 with addition of Milsaps and Southwestern (TX).)	26	Naperville, Illinois	}} || 9 || Suwanee, Georgia ||
State University of New York Athletic Conference	SUNYAC	1958	12	20	Fredonia, New York	
United East Conference	United East	2004	13 (Note: 17 full members in 2027 with addition of Centenary (NJ), Gwynedd Mercy, Immaculata, and Marymount University.)	20	Gansevoort, New York	
University Athletic Association	UAA	1986	8	22	Rochester, New York	
Upper Midwest Athletic Conference	UMAC	1972	8 (Note: 8 full members with Bethany Lutheran, North Central, Northland, and Wisconsin–Superior as non-football members; 6 football members with Greenville, and Westminster (MO) as football-only affiliates.)	16	St. Paul, Minnesota	
USA South Athletic Conference	USA South	1965	10 (Note: 10 full members with Mary Baldwin, Meredith, Pfeiffer, Salem College, and William Peace as non-football members; 9 football members with Belhaven, Huntingdon, LaGrange, and Maryville as football-affiliates.)	14	Fayetteville, North Carolina	
Wisconsin Intercollegiate Athletic Conference	WIAC	1913	8	22	Madison, Wisconsin	

=== Single-sport conferences ===
Conference	Nickname	Founded	Members	Sport	Headquarters	Map
Coastal Lacrosse Conference	CLC	2022	7	Men's lacrosse		
Colonial Women’s Golf Conference	CWGC	2025	7	Women's golf	N/A	
Continental Volleyball Conference	CVC	2011	9	Men's volleyball	Madison, New Jersey	
Midwest Collegiate Volleyball League	MCVL	2014	11	Men's volleyball	Bradenton, Florida	
Northeast Women's Golf Conference	NWGC	2019	14	Women's golf	N/A	
Northern Collegiate Hockey Association	NCHA	1981	10 (men); 7 (women)	Ice hockey	Waukesha, Wisconsin	
United Collegiate Hockey Conference	UCHC	2016	12 (men); 13 (women)	Ice hockey	Danbury, Connecticut	

=== Other sports ===
These all-sports conferences sponsor sports which do not have D-III championships. A Division III women's wrestling championship will be established in 2027–28; conferences affected by this change are highlighted in pink.

Conference	Nickname	Founded	Members (Note: Number reflects membership in the sport that lacks a D-III championship, not the total conference membership.)	Sport	Headquarters	Map
Allegheny Mountain Collegiate Conference	AMCC	1997	8	Bowling	North Boston, New York	
Allegheny Mountain Collegiate Conference	AMCC	1997	6	Women's wrestling	North Boston, New York	
American Rivers Conference	A-R-C	1922	7 (Note: 7 or 8 women's wrestling members in 2026. Former full member, Luther (IA), left for the Midwest Conference, but since that conference does not sponsor women's wrestling, Luther might remain an A-R-C associate.)	Women's wrestling	Cedar Rapids, Iowa	
College Conference of Illinois and Wisconsin	CCIW	1946	8	Bowling	Naperville, Illinois	
College Conference of Illinois and Wisconsin	CCIW	1946	9	Women's wrestling	Naperville, Illinois	
Middle Atlantic Conference	MAC	1912	6	Women's wrestling	Annville, Pennsylvania	
Metropolitan Swimming Conference	METS	?	14 (men); 17 (women)	1 (swimming)	?	
St. Louis Intercollegiate Athletic Conference	SLIAC	1989	6 (Note: 7 women's wrestling members at an indeterminate future time, with full conference member Blackburn adding the sport].)	Women's wrestling	St. Louis, Missouri	
Wisconsin Intercollegiate Athletic Conference	WIAC	1913	8	Women's gymnastics	Madison, Wisconsin	

== Defunct NCAA conferences ==
Conference	Division	Founded	Folded	Fate
America Sky Conference	Division I	2007	2014	Men's golf conference absorbed by the Big Sky Conference.
American Collegiate Athletic Association	Division III	2017	2020	Merged with the Capital Athletic Conference, with the merged conference renaming itself the Coast to Coast Athletic Conference shortly thereafter.
American Lacrosse Conference	Division I	2001	2014	Women's lacrosse conference that folded after the 2014 season due to fallout of the early-2010s conference realignment, specifically the 2013 announcement by the Big Ten that it would add men's and women's lacrosse for the 2014–15 school year (2015 season). Four of the seven final ALC members are full Big Ten members. Johns Hopkins went independent before joining Big Ten women's lacrosse in the 2017 season. The other two members became Big East affiliates.
American South Conference	Division I	1987	1991	Merged with the Sun Belt Conference. The new conference used the Sun Belt name.
Atlantic Central Football Conference	Division III	1997	2010	Disbanded
Atlantic Hockey Association	Division I	2003	2024	Founded in 1997 as the men's hockey league of the Metro Atlantic Athletic Conference (now known as the Metro Conference); separated from the MAAC in 2003. Merged with College Hockey America to form the current Atlantic Hockey America.
Atlantic Soccer Conference	Division I	2000	2012	Disbanded
Atlantic Women's Colleges Conference	Division III	1995	2007	Disbanded
Big Central Soccer Conference	Division I	1987	1991	Men's soccer-only conference disbanded after the all-sports conferences of all but two of its members began sponsoring the sport.
Big Eight Conference	Division I	1907	1996	Initially formed in January 1907 as the Missouri Valley Intercollegiate Athletic Association, before six schools split away to form the Big Six in 1928. Brought in four former Southwest Conference schools to grow into the Big 12 Conference.
Border Conference	University Division	1931	1962	Members split between the newly formed WAC and independent statuses.
Central Collegiate Hockey Association (original)	Division I	1971	2013	The decision of the Big Ten Conference to add men's ice hockey as a sponsored sport in the 2013–14 season, taking three of the most successful members of the then-11-member league, led to a major conference realignment that ultimately consumed the CCHA. Two members joined the new National Collegiate Hockey Conference, one member joined Hockey East, and the remaining five members joined or rejoined the Western Collegiate Hockey Association. The CCHA would be revived in 2021 with eight members, four of which played in the final season of the original league; the current CCHA considers itself a continuation of the original.
Central Intercollegiate Bowling Conference	Division III	2019	2020	Bowling-only league effectively absorbed by the College Conference of Illinois and Wisconsin.
Coastal Collegiate Sports Association	Division I	2008	2025	Originally started as a joint venture of several all-sports conferences to house their swimming & diving programs. Beach volleyball was later added to the conference's scope. The swimming & diving side was effectively absorbed by the Atlantic Sun Conference when it started sponsoring men's and women's swim/dive in 2023. Of the final four beach volleyball members, two joined the Big 12 Conference and two joined the Mountain Pacific Sports Federation for that sport after the 2025 season.
College Hockey America	Division I	1999	2024	Founded as a men's-only league; added a women's division in 2002. The men's division disbanded in 2010 after steady losses of membership. The women's division merged with the Atlantic Hockey Association to form the current Atlantic Hockey America
Colonial Hockey Conference	Division III	2015	2020	Women's ice hockey-only conference. Disbanded after the 2019–20 season when the Commonwealth Coast Conference (CCC), now known as the Conference of New England, took over operations. At that time, all of the remaining members were full members of the CCC.
Colonial States Athletic Conference	Division III	1992	2023	Merged with the United East Conference. The 'new' conference used the United East name.
Commonwealth Coast Football	Division III	1965	2022	Football-only conference, absorbed by the Commonwealth Coast Conference (now the Conference of New England). Rebranded in 2017 from its original name, the New England Football Conference.
Continental Divide Conference	Division II	???	1992	Women's-only conference that merged with the men's-only Great Northwest Conference (not to be confused with the current Great Northwest Athletic Conference) to form the Pacific West Conference.
Deep South Conference	Division II	1994	2013	Men's lacrosse conference disbanded when the South Atlantic Conference and Sunshine State Conference, home to all nine of the final conference members, began sponsoring the sport.
Dixie Conference	*	1930	1942	Disbanded after most of its members suspended athletics during World War II.
Dixie Conference	*	1948	1954	Disbanded
East Coast Conference	Division I	1958	1994	Absorbed by the Mid-Continent Conference, now known as The Summit League.
Eastern Collegiate Football Conference	Division III	2009	2024	Football-only conference. Disbanded
Eastern Intercollegiate Baseball League	*	1929	1992	Baseball-only conference absorbed by the Ivy League, disbanded when Army and Navy aligned their baseball teams with the bulk of their other teams in the Patriot League.
Eastern Intercollegiate Basketball League	*	1901	1955	Basketball-only conference absorbed by the Ivy League, which claims the EIBL as part of its own history.
Eastern Wrestling League	Division I	1975	2019	Wrestling-only league absorbed by the Mid-American Conference.
ECAC Lacrosse League	Division I	1999	2014	Men's lacrosse conference that disbanded after the 2014 season. The conference lost many members after the 2010 season when the original Big East launched a men's lacrosse league, and lost still more members with the Big Ten announcement. At the end of the final ECAC Lacrosse season, only one member had not announced a new lacrosse affiliation for the 2014–15 school year; that school would later join Southern Conference men's lacrosse.
ECAC Division II Lacrosse League	Division II	2012	2016	Disbanded. Six members began play in the Great Midwest Athletic Conference, leaving three members to become independents.
ECAC Northeast	Division III	1971	2016	Ice hockey-only conference. Disbanded
ECAC West	Division III	1984	2016	Ice hockey-only conference. Disbanded
Freedom Football Conference	Division III	1992	2003	Disbanded
Great Lakes Football Conference	Division II	2006	2012	Football-only conference, effectively absorbed by the Great Lakes Valley Conference.
Great Midwest Conference	Division I	1991	1995	Merged with the 1975–1995 Metro Conference to form Conference USA.
Great Northwest Conference	Division II	???	1992	The second part of the merger that created the current Pacific West Conference.
Great South Athletic Conference	Division III	1999	2016	Ended sponsorship of men's sports in 2012; remained a women-only league until disbanding entirely. One media outlet specializing in D-III sports coverage considered the Collegiate Conference of the South, formed in 2022 by an amicable split of the USA South Athletic Conference, a spiritual successor, noting that seven of the nine charter CCS members had been Great South members in the last season that it sponsored men's sports.
Great West Conference	Division I	2004	2013	Disbanded after all but one of its members joined more established conferences during the early-2010s conference realignment. The men's golf history and Internet presence of the Great West were maintained by the America Sky Conference (above) before the latter conference's absorption by the Big Sky.
Great West Hockey Conference	Division I	1985	1988	Ice hockey-only conference formed by four Western schools, but had one of its members drop hockey after its first season. After failing to attract additional members in 1988, the league folded when one of the remaining members shut down its entire athletic program.
Great Western Lacrosse League	Division I	1993	2010	Members joined the ECAC Lacrosse League (see above).
Gulf Coast Conference	College Division	1949	1957	Disbanded
Gulf Star Conference	Division I	1984	1987	Effectively absorbed by the Southland Conference.
Heartland Conference	Division II	1999	2019	In August 2017, eight of the nine members announced a mass exodus to the Lone Star Conference (LSC)—a conference with which the Heartland Conference had recently discussed a potential merger— effective in 2019. One of the eight schools changed course and instead opted to become a de facto member of the Mid-America Intercollegiate Athletics Association in 2019, joining the remaining Heartland member in that status.
High Country Athletic Conference	Division I	1983	1990	Women's-only conference absorbed by the Western Athletic Conference.
Indiana Collegiate Conference	Division II	1950	1978	Disbanded
Indiana Intercollegiate Conference	*	1922	1950	Disbanded
Indiana Intercollegiate Conference	Unknown	1922	1950	Split into two conferences, the Indiana Collegiate Conference was made of the larger schools; the Hoosier Collegiate Conference was made of the small, private schools
Interstate Intercollegiate Athletic Conference	University Division	1908	1970	Previously known as Illinois Intercollegiate Athletic Conference, disbanded.
Intercollegiate Athletic Association of the Northwest	*	1892	1893	Disbanded, precursor to the Big Ten Conference.
Lake Michigan Conference	Division III	1974	2007	Merged with the Northern Illinois-Iowa Conference to form the Northern Athletics Conference, now known as the Northern Athletics Collegiate Conference.
Metro Conference	Division I	1975	1995	Merged with the Great Midwest Conference to form Conference USA. Not to be confused with the D-I conference that assumed the Metro Conference name in July 2026, previously known as the Metro Atlantic Athletic Conference.
Metropolitan Collegiate Conference	University Division	1965	1969	Disbanded
Metropolitan New York Conference	University Division	1933	1963	Disbanded
Mid-Continent Athletic Association	Division II, later Division I	1978	1981	Football-only conference absorbed by the Association of Mid-Continent Universities in 1982. Effectively one of the precursors to the current Missouri Valley Football Conference.
Midwest Athletic Conference for Women	Division III	1977	1994	Merged with the men's Midwest Collegiate Athletic Conference, forming the current Midwest Conference.
Midwest Collegiate Hockey Association	Division III	1998	2013	Absorbed by the Northern Collegiate Hockey Association.
Midwest Lacrosse Conference	Division III	2009	2024	Men's lacrosse-only conference. Disbanded
Midwest Women's Lacrosse Conference	Division III	2010	2024	Women's lacrosse-only conference. Disbanded
Midwestern Conference	University Division	1970	1972	The five member schools were unable to find the 6th member required for NCAA recognition.
Mountain States Conference (aka Skyline Conference)	University Division	1938	1962	Disbanded, members split between the newly formed WAC and independent statuses.
Mountain Rim Gymnastics Conference	Division I	2013	2023	Women's gymnastics conference; disbanded after the Mountain West Conference began sponsoring women's gymnastics.
Mountain West Athletic Conference	Division I	1982	1988	Women's-only conference (not to be confused with the modern Mountain West Conference) absorbed by the Big Sky Conference.
National Lacrosse Conference	Division I	2008	2012	Disbanded after the Atlantic Sun Conference and Big South Conference began sponsoring women's lacrosse.
New England Collegiate Conference	Division III	2007	2026	Disbanded as an all-sports conference in 2023 after steady losses of membership, both by schools closing and moves to other conferences. It remained in operation for men's volleyball and the non-NCAA esports through the 2025–26 school year. The men's volleyball side disbanded after the spring 2026 season, leaving only esports, with the Conference of New England and New England Women's and Men's Athletic Conference starting to sponsor men's volleyball in spring 2027 and the Empire 8 elevating the sport to full NCAA championship status at the same time.
New England Conference	*	1938	1947	Disbanded; the final four members joined two other schools to form the Yankee Conference under a new charter. Effectively the earliest ancestor of CAA Football, a conference operated by the Coastal Athletic Association but a separate legal entity, although CAA Football does not claim the NEC's history.
New England Hockey Conference	Division III	2015	2025	Ice hockey-only conference. Disbanded
New England Women's Lacrosse Alliance	Division III	1998	2012	Disbanded
New South Women's Athletic Conference	Division I	1985	1991	Women's-only conference initially known as the New South Conference; absorbed by the Trans America Athletic Conference, now known as the Atlantic Sun Conference.
North Central Conference	Division II	1922	2008	Disbanded
North East Collegiate Volleyball Association	Division III	1995	2011	Men's volleyball conference disbanded in 2011 due to the 2012 establishment of the NCAA Division III Men's Volleyball Championship. Most of the all-sports conferences that were home to NECVA members began sponsoring men's volleyball at that time.
Northeast Women's Hockey League	Division III	2017	2023	Women's ice hockey only conference. It was absorbed by SUNYAC.
North Star Conference	Division I	1983	1992	Women's-only conference effectively absorbed by the Mid-Continent Conference (now The Summit League).
Northern California Athletic Conference	Division II	1925	1996	Football-only conference, dissolved when most members decided to drop football.
Northern Illinois-Iowa Conference	Division III	1969	2007	Merged with the Lake Michigan Conference to form the Northern Athletics Conference, now known as the Northern Athletics Collegiate Conference.
Northern Pacific Conference	Division I	1982	1986	Women's-only conference. Disbanded when the Pac-10, home to five of the seven final conference members, began sponsoring women's sports.
Northern Pacific Field Hockey Conference	Division I	1982	2015	Field hockey-only conference that folded after the 2014 season. After a period in which the conference expanded to span both coasts, most of the eastern teams left over time. Four of the six final members, all from California (and also the league's founding members), became America East affiliates. The remaining two members became independents; one is now a field hockey member of the Big East and the other is now a MAC field hockey member.
Northern Sun Conference	Division II	1979	1992	Women's-only conference that merged with the men's Northern Intercollegiate Conference, forming the Northern Sun Intercollegiate Conference.
Ohio River Lacrosse Conference	Division III	2014	2018	Men's and women's lacrosse-only conference. Disbanded after the 2017–18 season.
Pacific Coast Conference	University Division	1915	1959	Forerunner to the Pac-12, disbanded due to scandal and infighting. The Pac-12 considers its history to have started with the formation of the PCC.
Pacific Coast Softball Conference	Division I	2002	2013	Softball-only; disbanded due to fallout from the early-2010s conference realignment. After the 2012 season, it lost five members when the Big Sky added the sport and a sixth to the WAC. After the 2013 season, the final seven members left when the West Coast Conference began sponsoring the sport (five were already WCC members, and the other two joined the WAC in softball).
Pilgrim Lacrosse League	Division III	1986	2014	Absorbed by the NEWMAC.
Southeast Team Handball Conference	Division I (de facto)	1997	2006	Women-only team handball conference. Disbanded when the sport was dropped from the NCAA Emerging Sports for Women program.
Southland Bowling League	Division I	2015	2023	Bowling-only league founded by, but independent of, the Southland Conference. Merged into Conference USA; one of the final members was already a full CUSA member, another became a full CUSA member in 2023, and the others became CUSA associates.
Southern Intercollegiate Athletic Association	*	1894	1941	Disbanded with the onset of American involvement in World War II.
Southwest Conference	Division I	1914	1996	Disbanded. 4 members left to join the Big Eight Conference in forming the Big 12. 3 members left to join the WAC. 1 member left to join CUSA.
Texas Intercollegiate Athletic Association	Division III	1976	1996	Disbanded. All final members joined the American Southwest Conference.
United Soccer Conference	Division I	2005	2009	Women's soccer-only, absorbed by the Great West Conference.
United Volleyball Conference	Division III	2010	2026	Men's volleyball conference that shared offices with the all-sports Empire 8, but was a separate entity. Disbanded after the 2026 season when the Empire 8 elevated men's volleyball to full NCAA championship status, along with CNE and NEWMAC beginning to sponsor the sport.
West Virginia Intercollegiate Athletic Conference	Division II	1924	2013	Disbanded after the conference's football schools announced a split from the non-football schools. Ultimately, nine of the final schools became charter members of the Mountain East Conference, three joined the Great Midwest Athletic Conference, two joined the PSAC, and one went independent.
Western Collegiate Athletic Association	Division I	1981	1986	Women's-only conference; known in its final season of 1985–86 as the Pacific West Conference (not to be confused with the current NCAA Division II conference). Disbanded when the Pac-10, home to the final five conference members, began sponsoring women's sports.
Western Intercollegiate Lacrosse Association	Division II	2010	2015	Lacrosse-only conference absorbed by the Rocky Mountain Athletic Conference; all final teams are members of the RMAC, including one affiliate. The RMAC had absorbed the women's side of the WILA in 2013; five of the members were RMAC members including one affiliate, one additional women's member became an independent.
Western Wrestling Conference	Division I	2006	2015	Wrestling-only conference effectively absorbed by the Big 12 Conference, with all but one of its final members immediately becoming single-sport Big 12 associates and the remaining member joining Big 12 wrestling in 2017.
Yankee Conference	Division I	1947	1997	Football-only conference from 1975 until its absorption by the Atlantic 10 Conference in 1997. Also an effective ancestor of CAA Football, and officially recognized by CAA Football as its earliest predecessor.

- * - Operated before the NCAA split into divisions in 1955.

In addition to the above, two single-sport conferences that currently participate in NCAA National Collegiate sports (those whose championship events are open to members of more than one NCAA division) and previously operated both men's and women's divisions now operate as women-only leagues.

Conference	Division	Founded	Folded	Fate
Golden Coast Conference (men's)	National Collegiate	2013	2023	Water polo-only conference founded as a women's-only league; added a men's division in 2016. The men's division disbanded after the 2022 season (2022–23 school year) after all six of its final members joined the new men's water polo leagues of the Big West Conference and West Coast Conference.
Western Collegiate Hockey Association (men's)	Division I	1951	2021	Founded as a men's-only league; added a women's division in 1999. The men's division disbanded in 2021 after seven of its members left to reestablish the Central Collegiate Hockey Association; two other men's members dropped hockey, and the other went independent.

== Conferences set to disband ==
This section is reserved for conferences currently in operation, but likely to disband in the near future due to major membership losses.

Conference	Division	Founded	Folding	Background
Atlantic East Conference	Division III	2016	2027	After four schools left the conference between 2021 and 2026, two others announced that they would leave for the City University of New York Athletic Conference in 2027, leaving only four members. Those four schools were soon accepted as new members of the United East Conference, also effective in 2027.

== See also ==
- List of college athletic conferences in the United States
- List of schools reclassifying their athletic programs to NCAA Division I
- List of NAIA conferences
