= American Rivers Conference =

American college athletic conference

- Formerly: Iowa Intercollegiate Athletic Conference (IIAC)
- Association: NCAA
- Founded: 1922
- Commissioner: Marie Stroman (since 2023)
- Sports fielded: 22; men's: 11; women's: 11
- Division: Division III
- No. of teams: 8
- Headquarters: Cedar Rapids, Iowa
- Region: Iowa, Nebraska
- Website: rollrivers.com

Locations
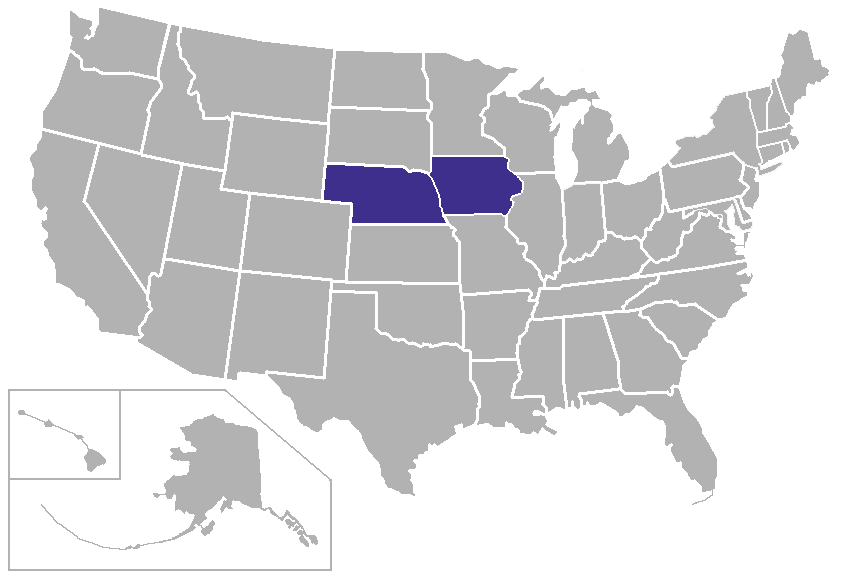

The American Rivers Conference (A-R-C) is an intercollegiate athletic conference that competes in the National Collegiate Athletic Association (NCAA) Division III. From 1927 until August 9, 2018, it was known officially as the Iowa Intercollegiate Athletic Conference (IIAC) and commonly as the Iowa Conference.

== History ==
Iowa Intercollegiate Athletic Association began in 1890. The A-R-C dates back to December 8, 1922, when representatives from 12 colleges from the Iowa Intercollegiate Athletic Association merged. Charter members were Buena Vista College, Central University of Iowa, Ellsworth College, Iowa Wesleyan College, Luther College, Morningside College, Parsons College, St. Ambrose College, Simpson College, Upper Iowa University, Western Union College and Penn College. Des Moines University was voted into the conference at that meeting as well.

The first Conference constitution was published in January 1923. Also that year, Judge Hubert Utterback of Des Moines, Iowa was named the first conference commissioner and Iowa Teachers (now known as the University of Northern Iowa) was accepted as a member. Columbia College (now known as Loras College) was admitted in 1926. Ellsworth left the conference in 1927. That spring, the conference's name was changed to the "Iowa Intercollegiate Athletic Conference." After a three-year ban, athletics were reinstated at the University of Dubuque in 1928–29, and it joined the conference in 1929. Wartburg College was admitted to the conference in 1936, beginning competition the following year. Morningside dropped out in 1936 because of inactivity. William Penn was suspended from the conference in 1949 for using ineligible players. The school was back in the conference in 1951, though it did not compete in football until later. In 1951, St. Ambrose and Loras dropped from football competition.

The Iowa Conference reorganized in 1953, effective with the 1954–55 school year. Nine schools remained in the conference: Buena Vista, Central, Dubuque, Iowa Wesleyan, Luther, Parsons, Simpson, Upper Iowa and Wartburg. William Penn was re-admitted to the conference in 1960, effective in the spring of 1962. Parsons left the conference around 1963, while Iowa Wesleyan left effective June 1, 1965. Loras re-joined the conference in 1986, increasing the conference membership to nine schools, which continued until 1997 when Coe and Cornell left the Midwest Conference to join the IIAC. The Conference was at 11 schools until its 80th-anniversary year (2001–02) when William Penn decided to leave and switch its affiliation from the NCAA to the NAIA. The IIAC became a nine-school conference when Upper Iowa reclassified to NCAA Division II prior to the start of the 2003–04 academic year and fell back to eight schools with Cornell's return to the Midwest Conference following the 2011–12 academic year.

The conference expanded beyond the borders of Iowa in 2016 with the addition of Nebraska Wesleyan University. On August 9, 2018, the league changed its name to the American Rivers Conference to reflect its current makeup.

=== Chronological timeline ===
- 1922 – On December 8, 1922, the American Rivers Conference was founded as the Iowa Intercollegiate Athletic Association (IIAA). Charter members included Buena Vista College (now Buena Vista University), Central University of Iowa (now Central College), Des Moines University, Ellsworth College (now Ellsworth Community College), Iowa Wesleyan College (later Iowa Wesleyan University), Luther College, Morningside College (now Morningside University), Parsons College, St. Ambrose College (now St. Ambrose University), Simpson College, Upper Iowa College (now Upper Iowa University), Western Union College (later Westmar University) and Penn College (now William Penn University), beginning the 1922–23 academic year.
- 1923 – Iowa State Teachers College (now the University of Northern Iowa) joined the IIAA in the 1923–24 academic year.
- 1926 – Columbia College of Iowa joined the IIAA in the 1926–27 academic year.
- 1927:
  - Ellsworth left the IIAA after the 1926–27 academic year.
  - The IIAA was rebranded as the Iowa Intercollegiate Athletic Conference (IIAC) during the spring season, beginning the 1927–28 academic year.
- 1929:
  - Des Moines U. left the IIAC as the school ceased operations after the 1928–29 academic year.
  - The University of Dubuque joined the IIAC in the 1929–30 academic year.
- 1935 – Northern Iowa left the IIAC fully align with the North Central Intercollegiate Athletic Conference (NCIAC) after the 1934–35 academic year.
- 1936 – Morningside left the IIAC to fully align with the NCIAC after the 1935–36 academic year.
- 1937 – Wartburg College joined the IIAC in the 1937–38 academic year.
- 1949 – William Penn was suspended for two seasons by the IIAC after the 1948–49 academic year.
- 1951 – William Penn was reinstated back to the IIAC in the 1951–52 academic year.
- 1954 – Loras, St. Ambrose, Westmar and William Penn left the IIAC after the 1953–54 academic year.
- 1960 – William Penn rejoined the IIAC, beginning the 1962 spring season of the 1961–62 academic year.
- 1965 – Iowa Wesleyan left the IIAC after the 1964–65 academic year.
- 1986 – Loras rejoined the IIAC in the 1986–87 academic year.
- 1997 – Coe College and Cornell College joined the IIAC in the 1997–98 academic year.
- 2001 – William Penn left the IIAC for a second time to join the National Association of Intercollegiate Athletics (NAIA) and the Midwest Collegiate Conference (MCC) after the 2000–01 academic year.
- 2003 – Upper Iowa left the IIAC to join the Division II ranks of the National Collegiate Athletic Association (NCAA) as an NCAA D-II Independent (which would later join the Northern Sun Intercollegiate Conference (NSIC) beginning the 2006–07 academic year) after the 2002–03 academic year.
- 2012 – Cornell left the IIAC to rejoin the Midwest Conference (MWC) after the 2011–12 academic year.
- 2016 – Nebraska Wesleyan University joined the IIAC in the 2016–17 academic year.
- 2018 – On August 9, 2018, the IIAC was rebranded as the American Rivers Conference (A-R-C) in the 2018–19 academic year.
- 2026 – Luther left the A-R-C to join the MWC after the 2025–26 academic year.

== Member schools ==
=== Current members ===
Map of current members
full

The A-R-C currently has eight full members; all are private schools:

Institution	Location	Founded	Affiliation	Enrollment	Nickname	Colors	Joined (Note: Represents the calendar year when fall sports competition begins.)
Buena Vista University	Storm Lake, Iowa	1891	Presbyterian	1,890	Beavers		1922
Central College	Pella, Iowa	1853	Reformed	1,084	Dutch		1922
Coe College	Cedar Rapids, Iowa	1851	Presbyterian	1,195	Kohawks		1997
University of Dubuque	Dubuque, Iowa	1852	Presbyterian	1,757	Spartans		1929
Loras College	Dubuque, Iowa	1839	Catholic (Archdiocese of Dubuque)	1,189	Duhawks		1926; 1986 (Note: Loras was dropped from the IIAC after the 1953–54 school year because it was determined they were "too strong" for the other members to play against. Loras rejoined the IIAC in the 1986–87 school year.)
Nebraska Wesleyan University	Lincoln, Nebraska	1887	United Methodist	1,654	Prairie Wolves		2016
Simpson College	Indianola, Iowa	1860	United Methodist	1,251	Storm		1922
Wartburg College	Waverly, Iowa	1852	Lutheran ELCA	1,483	Knights		1936

=== Former members ===
The A-R-C had 12 former full members, all but two were private schools:

Institution	Location (Note: All cities were located in the State of Iowa.)	Founded	Affiliation	Nickname	Joined (Note: Represents the calendar year when fall sports competition begins.)	Left (Note: Represents the calendar year when spring sports competition ends.)	Current conference
Cornell College	Mount Vernon	1853	United Methodist	Rams	1997	2012	Midwest (MWC)
Des Moines University	Des Moines	1898	Not-for-profit	N/A	1922	1929	Closed in 1929
Ellsworth Community College	Iowa Falls	1890	Public	Panthers	1922	1927	Iowa (ICCAC) (Note: Currently an NJCAA athletic conference.)
University of Northern Iowa	Cedar Falls	1876	Public	Panthers	1923	1935	Missouri Valley (MVC) (Note: Currently an NCAA Division I athletic conference.)
Iowa Wesleyan University	Mount Pleasant	1842	United Methodist	Tigers	1922	1965	Closed in 2023
Luther College	Decorah, Iowa	1861	Lutheran ELCA	Norse	1922	2026	Midwest (MWC)
Morningside University	Sioux City	1894	United Methodist	Mustangs	1922	1936	Great Plains (GPAC) (Note: Currently an NAIA athletic conference.)
Parsons College	Fairfield	1875	Presbyterian	Wildcats	1922	1963	Closed in 1973
St. Ambrose University	Davenport	1882	Catholic (Diocese of Davenport)	Fighting Bees	1922	1954 (Note: St. Ambrose was dropped from the IIAC after the 1953–54 school year because it was determined they were "too strong" for the other members to play against.)	Heart of America (HAAC)
Upper Iowa University	Fayette	1857	Nonsectarian	Peacocks	1922	2003	Great Lakes Valley (GLVC) (Note: Currently an NCAA Division II athletic conference.)
Westmar University	Le Mars	1887	United Methodist	Eagles	1922	1954 (Note: Westmar was dropped from the IIAC after the 1953–54 school year because it was determined they were "too weak" for the other members to play against.)	Closed in 1997
William Penn University	Oskaloosa	1873	Society of Friends	Statesmen	1922; 1962	1954; 2001 (Note: William Penn was suspended from the conference from 1949–50 to 1950–51 and then removed from the IIAC for being "too weak" after the 1953–54 school year; William Penn would later rejoin the IIAC from the 1962 spring season (1961–62 school year) to 2000–01.)	Heart of America (HAAC)

=== Membership timeline ===
Full member (all sports) Full member (non-football) Associate member (football) Associate member (sport)

== Sports ==
Conference sports
Sport	Men's	Women's
Baseball	✓	
Basketball	✓	✓
Cheer & Dance		✓ (Note: The American Rivers Conference has a policy in which sports may be sponsored as an invited if petitioned by a group of schools. Cheer & Dance, Men's & Women's Swimming & Diving, and Women's Wrestling have all successfully petitioned to be sponsored through an invitational.)
Cross country	✓	✓
Football	✓	
Golf	✓	✓
Soccer	✓	✓
Softball		✓
Swimming & Diving	✓	✓
Tennis	✓	✓
Track & field (indoor)	✓	✓
Track & field (outdoor)	✓	✓
Volleyball		✓
Wrestling	✓	✓

=== Men's sponsored sports by school ===
School	Baseball	Basketball	Cross Country	Football	Golf	Soccer	Swimming & Diving	Tennis	Track & Field (Indoor)	Track & Field (Outdoor)	Wrestling	Total A-R-C Sports
Buena Vista	✓	✓	✓	✓	✓	✓	✗	✓	✓	✓	✓	10
Central	✓	✓	✓	✓	✓	✓	✗	✓	✓	✓	✓	10
Coe	✓	✓	✓	✓	✓	✓	✓	✓	✓	✓	✓	11
Dubuque	✓	✓	✓	✓	✓	✓	✗	✓	✓	✓	✓	10
Loras	✓	✓	✓	✓	✓	✓	✓	✓	✓	✓	✓	11
Nebraska Wesleyan	✓	✓	✓	✓	✓	✓	✓	✓	✓	✓	✓	11
Simpson	✓	✓	✓	✓	✓	✓	✓	✓	✓	✓	✓	11
Wartburg	✓	✓	✓	✓	✓	✓	✗	✓	✓	✓	✓	10

==== Men's varsity sports not sponsored by the American Rivers Conference that are played by American Rivers schools ====
School	Gymnastics	Ice Hockey	Lacrosse	Shooting Sports (Note: Not sponsored by the NCAA.)	Volleyball
Coe				NCSSAA	
Dubuque		NCHA	MLC		
Loras					CCIW
Simpson	EIGL			NCSSAA	Independent
Wartburg				SCTP	

=== Women's sponsored sports by school ===
School	Basketball	Cheer & Dance (Note: Not sponsored by the NCAA.)	Cross Country	Golf	Soccer	Softball	Swimming & Diving	Tennis	Track & Field (Indoor)	Track & Field (Outdoor)	Volleyball	Wrestling (Note: De facto Division I sport through the 2026–27 school year, with the NCAA holding a single women's wrestling championship meet open to members of all divisions. A dedicated Division III championship will be established in 2027–28.)	Total A-R-C Sports
Buena Vista	✓	✓	✓	✓	✓	✓	✗	✓	✓	✓	✓	✓	11
Central	✓	✓	✓	✓	✓	✓	✗	✓	✓	✓	✓	✓	11
Coe	✓	✓	✓	✓	✓	✓	✓	✓	✓	✓	✓	✗ (Note: Coe will add women's wrestling in 2026–27.)	11
Dubuque	✓	✓	✓	✓	✓	✓	✗	✓	✓	✓	✓	✓	11
Loras	✓	✓	✓	✓	✓	✓	✓	✓	✓	✓	✓	✓	12
Nebraska Wesleyan	✓	✓	✓	✓	✓	✓	✓	✓	✓	✓	✓	✗	11
Simpson	✓	✓	✓	✓	✓	✓	✓	✓	✓	✓	✓	✓	12
Wartburg	✓	✓	✓	✓	✓	✓	✗	✓	✓	✓	✓	✓	11

==== Women's varsity sports not sponsored by the American Rivers Conference that are played by American Rivers schools ====
School	Gymnastics	Shooting Sports	Triathlon (Note: Part of the NCAA Emerging Sports for Women program.)
Central			Independent
Coe		NCSSAA	Independent
Simpson	Independent	NCSSAA	
Wartburg		SCTP	
