= Midwest Lacrosse Conference =

- Association: NCAA
- Founded: 2010
- Commissioner: G. Steven Larson
- Sports fielded: 1 (men's lacrosse)
- Division: Division III
- No. of teams: 5 (2024)
- Headquarters: Minneapolis, Minnesota
- Region: Midwestern United States
- Official website: mlc-mwlc.org

The Midwest Lacrosse Conference (MLC) was a men's National Collegiate Athletic Association (NCAA) Division III lacrosse-only college athletic conference composed of schools located in the Midwestern United States. All schools were members of conferences that do not sponsor lacrosse.

== History ==
Founding members Adrian College, Albion College, Carthage College, Fontbonne University, Milwaukee School of Engineering, College of Mount St. Joseph and Trine University ratified bylaws on June 2, 2009. The NCAA recognition of the new conference went into effect September 1, 2009 and conference play began on February 13, 2010. Many of the MLC members also field women's lacrosse as part of the Midwest Women's Lacrosse Conference, which began in 2011.

Because the Michigan Intercollegiate Athletic Association added lacrosse beginning with the 2013 season, their members played their last season in the MLC during 2012. Likewise, the College Conference of Illinois and Wisconsin added lacrosse beginning with the 2015 season, so their teams played their last season in the MLC during 2014. The three schools in the Heartland Collegiate Athletic Conference starting playing in the new lacrosse-only Ohio River Lacrosse Conference in 2015 as well.

Beloit College and Cornell College joined the MLC in the spring of 2015. Concordia University Chicago joined in 2016 and Monmouth College joined in 2017. Marian University continued to expand the conference in 2018.

In 2019, the conference added North Central University and University of Northwestern – St. Paul. Both universities are members of the Upper Midwest Athletic Conference for other sports and had been independent programs for men's lacrosse. Further change came before the 2020 season when the conference added Illinois Tech and Fontbonne announced that the men's lacrosse program would be suspended indefinitely due to low participation numbers for the program. In 2021, the Northern Athletics Collegiate Conference brought its lacrosse-sponsoring institutions - Aurora, Benedictine, Concordia Chicago, Concordia Wisconsin, Illinois Tech, Marian, Milwaukee School of Engineering and affiliate member Beloit - directly under the NACC umbrella. This continues the pattern of the Midwest Lacrosse Conference providing league opportunities for schools until such time that their conference sponsors the sport.

Following the conclusion of the 2023 season, Monmouth announced the discontinuation of its men's and women's lacrosse program, dropping the conference to five members.

In 2024, the conference jointly announced the conclusion of Midwest Lacrosse Conference and the Midwest Women's Lacrosse Conference. Of the remaining members, Cornell, Dubuque, and Lake Forest would join the Northern Athletics Collegiate Conference as affiliates, Northwestern-St. Paul would discontinue its lacrosse programs following the 2024 season, and Northland would shut down as an institution entirely.

== Member schools ==
=== Final Members ===
Institution	Nickname	Location	Founded	Type	Enrollment	Joined	Home Conference
Cornell College	Rams	Mount Vernon, Iowa	1853	Private (United Methodist)	1,200	2015	Midwest
University of Dubuque	Spartans	Dubuque, Iowa	1852	Private (Presbyterian)	2,190	2022	American Rivers
Lake Forest College	Foresters	Lake Forest, Illinois	1857	Private (Nonsectarian)	1,700	2022	Midwest
Northland College (Wisconsin)	LumberJacks	Ashland, Wisconsin	1892	Private (United Church of Christ)	526	2021	Closed in 2025
University of Northwestern – St. Paul	Eagles	Roseville, Minnesota	1902	Private (Nondenominational)	2,944	2019	Upper Midwest

=== Former Members ===
Institution	Nickname	Location	Founded	Type	Joined	Left	Current Conference
Adrian College	Bulldogs	Adrian, Michigan	1859	Private (United Methodist)	2010	2013	MIAA
Albion College	Britons	Albion, Michigan	1835	Private (United Methodist)	2010	2013	MIAA
Augustana College	Vikings	Rock Island, Illinois	1860	Private (Lutheran ELCA)	2013	2015	CCIW
Aurora University	Spartans	Aurora, Illinois	1893	Private (Nonsectarian)	3,000	2011	Northern
Beloit College	Buccaneers	Beloit, Wisconsin	1846	Private (Nonsectarian)	1,300	2015	Midwest
Benedictine University	Eagles	Lisle, Illinois	1887	Private (Catholic)	3,800	2013	Northern
Carthage College	Red Men	Kenosha, Wisconsin	1847	Private (Lutheran ELCA)	2010	2015	CCIW
Concordia University Chicago	Cougars	River Forest. Illinois	1864	Private (Lutheran LCMS)	1,600	2016	Northern
Concordia University Wisconsin	Falcons	Mequon. Wisconsin	1881	Private (Lutheran LCMS)	4,400	2011	Northern
Defiance College	Yellow Jackets	Defiance, Ohio	1850	Private (United Church of Christ)	2013	2015	Ohio River
Fontbonne University	Griffins	St. Louis, Missouri	1923	Private (Catholic)	2010	2019	Program disbanded
Elmhurst College	Bluejays	Elmhurst, Illinois	1871	Private (United Church of Christ)	2013	2015	CCIW
Hanover College	Panthers	Hanover, Indiana	1827	Private (Presbyterian)	2012	2015	Ohio River
Illinois Institute of Technology	Scarlet Hawks	Chicago, Illinois	1890	Private (Nonsectarian)	2,977	2020	Northern
Marian University	Sabres	Fond du Lac, Wisconsin	1936	Private (Catholic)	1,497	2018	Northern
Milwaukee School of Engineering	Raiders	Milwaukee, Wisconsin	1903	Private (Nonsectarian)	2,500	2010	Northern
Monmouth College	Fighting Scots	Monmouth, Illinois	1853	Private (Presbyterian)	1,300	2023	Program disbanded
Mount St. Joseph University	Lions	Delhi Township, Ohio	1920	Private (Catholic)	2012	2015	Ohio River
North Central University	Rams	Minneapolis, Minnesota	1930	Private (Assemblies of God)	1,200	2019	Upper Midwest
Trine University	Thunder	Angola, Indiana	1884	Private (Nonsectarian)	2010	2013	MIAA
