= Eastern College Athletic Conference =

Sports federation of colleges and universities in the eastern United States

Coordinates: 41°38′34″N 70°20′47.48″W

- Association: NCAA
- Founded: 1938; 88 years ago
- Commissioner: Dan Coonan (since 2017)
- Sports fielded: 15; men's: 13; women's: 12
- Division: I, II, III
- No. of teams: 220
- Headquarters: Danbury, Connecticut, U.S.
- Region: East Coast
- Official website: ecacsports.com

Locations
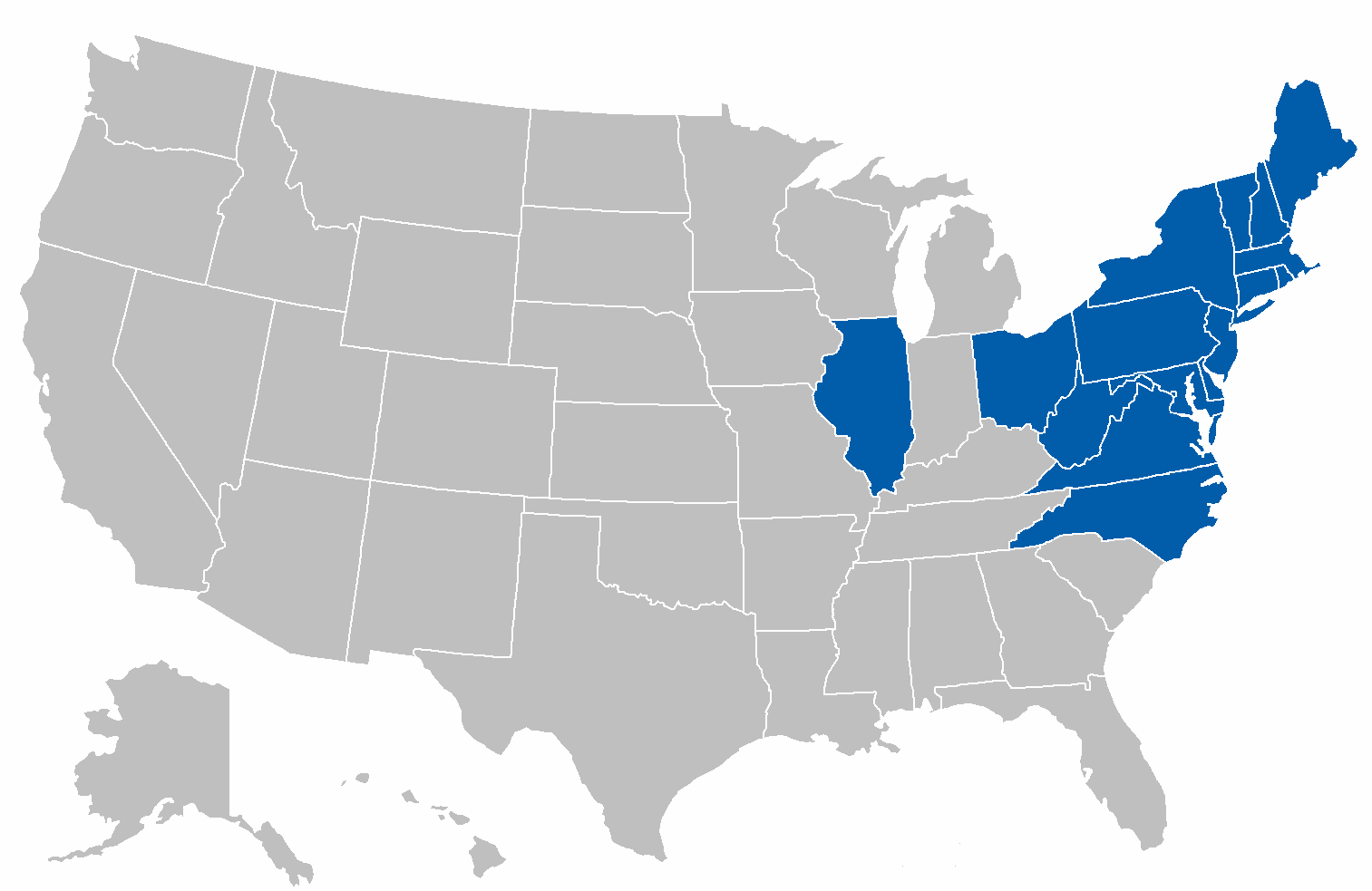

The Eastern College Athletic Conference (ECAC) is a college athletic conference comprising schools that compete in 15 sports (13 men's and 12 women's). It has 220 member institutions in NCAA Divisions I, II, and III, ranging in location from Maine to South Carolina and west to Missouri. Most or all members belong to at least one other athletic conference.

The ECAC was founded as the Central Office for Eastern Intercollegiate Athletics in 1938, largely through the efforts of James Lynah of Cornell University. In 1983, the Eastern Association of Intercollegiate Athletics for Women (EAIAW) was consolidated into the ECAC. Most member schools are in other conferences as well, but through the ECAC they are able to participate in sports that their main conferences do not offer. Its headquarters are located in Danbury, Connecticut. The ECAC also now offers esports competitions to its member schools.

== Membership ==
=== Division I ===
As of fall 2023, there are 78 Division I members.

=== Division II ===
As of fall 2023, there are 7 Division II members.

=== Division III ===
As of spring 2018, there are 79 Division III members.

== Affiliates ==
The ECAC has several affiliated single-sport leagues:

- Eastern Association of Rowing Colleges
- Eastern Association of Women's Rowing Colleges
- ECAC Equestrian
- Eastern Intercollegiate Gymnastics League
- Intercollegiate Rowing Association
- Intercollegiate Association of Amateur Athletes in America

Two other formerly affiliated conferences are defunct:

- ECAC Lacrosse League
- ECAC Division II Lacrosse League

Two existing conferences were affiliated in the past, but have since become independent.

- ECAC Hockey (men and women) – independent since 2004
- Gymnastics East Conference (women only) – independent since 2021

== Sports ==
ECAC SPORTS
Sport	DI-M	DI-W	DII-M	DII-W	DIII-M	DIII-W
Baseball					✓	
Basketball			✓	✓	✓	✓
Cross Country	✓	✓			✓	✓
Equestrian		✓		✓		✓
Field hockey						✓
Football			✓		✓	
Golf	✓	✓			✓	
Gymnastics	✓					
Ice Hockey						
Lacrosse				✓	✓	✓
Soccer			✓	✓	✓	✓
Softball				✓		✓
Swimming & Diving	✓	✓	✓	✓	✓	✓
Tennis	✓	✓			✓	✓
Track & Field (Indoor)	✓	✓			✓	✓
Track & Field (Outdoor)	✓	✓			✓	✓
Volleyball				✓	✓	✓

== ECAC men's basketball tournaments ==
At various times, the ECAC has organized regional college basketball championship tournaments at the end of the regular season for teams playing at the NCAA Division I, Division II, and Division III levels. It held the Division I tournaments from 1975 to 1982 to provide independent colleges and universities in the northeastern United States with a means of participating in end-of-season tournaments that resulted in the winning team receiving an automatic bid to the NCAA Division I men's basketball tournament, similar to the end-of-season tournaments held by conventional athletic conferences. The Division I ECAC tournaments were discontinued after all participating schools joined conferences of their own during the late 1970s and early 1980s.

The ECAC also held combined Division II/III regional end-of- season tournaments from 1973 to 1980 and a single Division II-only tournament after the regular season from 1988 to 2006 and in 2007, 2008, and 2014. Since 1981, it has organized regional Division III-only men's basketball tournaments annually at the end of each regular season.

== ECAC Division III football bowls ==
In football, the ECAC organizes four NCAA Division III bowl games each year. The bowl games are as follow:

- ECAC Asa S. Bushnell Bowl
- ECAC Clayton Chapman Bowl
- ECAC James Lynah Bowl
- ECAC Scotty Whitelaw Bowl

== Awards ==
See footnotes

- Div. I FBS Football Major Awards
- Div. I FCS Football Major Awards
- Div II Football Major Awards
- Div. III Football Major Awards
- Robbins Scholar-Athletes
- Award of Merit (for student-athletes)
- Award of Valor (for student-athletes)
- ECAC Rowing Trophy

== See also ==
- ECAC Hockey, a Division I ice hockey conference previously affiliated with the ECAC
- Mountain Pacific Sports Federation, a similar Division I conference in the western U.S.
