= North Boston, New York =

- Census-designated place
- Location in Erie County and the state of New York
- Coordinates: 42°40′55″N 78°47′3″W
- Country: United States
- State: New York
- County: Erie
- Town: Boston

Area
  - Total: 4.13 sq mi (10.69 km^{2})
  - Land: 4.13 sq mi (10.69 km^{2})
  - Water: 0 sq mi (0.00 km^{2})
- Elevation: 823 ft (251 m)

Population (2020)
  - Total: 2,529
  - Density: 612.6/sq mi (236.54/km^{2})
- Time zone: UTC-5 (Eastern (EST))
  - Summer (DST): UTC-4 (EDT)
- ZIP Codes: 14110 (PO box); 14075 (Hamburg)
- Area code: 716
- FIPS code: 36-51583
- GNIS feature ID: 0958691

North Boston is a hamlet and census-designated place (CDP) in the town of Boston in Erie County, New York, United States. As of the 2020 census, North Boston had a population of 2,529. It is part of the Buffalo–Niagara Falls Metropolitan Statistical Area.

North Boston is on the northern town line, located around the junction of NY Routes 277 and 391.

== Geography ==
North Boston is located at 42°40′55″N 78°47′3″W (42.681935, -78.784065).

According to the United States Census Bureau, the CDP has a total area of 4.1 square miles (11 km^{2}), all land.

== Demographics ==
Historical population
Census	Pop.	Note	%±
2020	2,529		—
U.S. Decennial Census

=== 2020 census ===
As of the 2020 census, North Boston had a population of 2,529. The median age was 50.1 years. 16.3% of residents were under the age of 18 and 23.9% of residents were 65 years of age or older. For every 100 females there were 97.7 males, and for every 100 females age 18 and over there were 96.5 males age 18 and over.

72.4% of residents lived in urban areas, while 27.6% lived in rural areas.

There were 1,149 households in North Boston, of which 20.4% had children under the age of 18 living in them. Of all households, 50.5% were married-couple households, 19.1% were households with a male householder and no spouse or partner present, and 23.8% were households with a female householder and no spouse or partner present. About 30.1% of all households were made up of individuals and 16.0% had someone living alone who was 65 years of age or older.

There were 1,214 housing units, of which 5.4% were vacant. The homeowner vacancy rate was 0.5% and the rental vacancy rate was 9.1%.

Racial composition as of the 2020 census
Race	Number	Percent
White	2,410	95.3%
Black or African American	4	0.2%
American Indian and Alaska Native	3	0.1%
Asian	6	0.2%
Native Hawaiian and Other Pacific Islander	1	0.0%
Some other race	6	0.2%
Two or more races	99	3.9%
Hispanic or Latino (of any race)	42	1.7%

=== 2000 census ===
At the 2000 census there were 2,680 people, 1,049 households, and 766 families living in the CDP. The population density was 652.9 inhabitants per square mile (252.1/km^{2}). There were 1,080 housing units at an average density of 263.1 per square mile (101.6/km^{2}). The racial makeup of the CDP was 99.10% White, 0.07% African American, 0.19% Native American, 0.04% Asian, 0.04% Pacific Islander, 0.26% from other races, and 0.30% from two or more races. Hispanic or Latino of any race were 0.90%.

Of the 1,049 households 31.6% had children under the age of 18 living with them, 62.1% were married couples living together, 8.3% had a female householder with no husband present, and 26.9% were non-families. 23.0% of households were one person and 9.4% were one person aged 65 or older. The average household size was 2.55 and the average family size was 3.02.

The age distribution was 24.0% under the age of 18, 6.3% from 18 to 24, 29.3% from 25 to 44, 26.3% from 45 to 64, and 14.1% 65 or older. The median age was 40 years. For every 100 females, there were 100.0 males. For every 100 females age 18 and over, there were 95.5 males.

The median household income was $45,898 and the median family income was $57,266. Males had a median income of $35,833 versus $29,479 for females. The per capita income for the CDP was $22,089. About 1.0% of families and 1.8% of the population were below the poverty line, including 2.2% of those under age 18 and 4.2% of those age 65 or over.
