= Midwest Women's Lacrosse Conference =

- Association: NCAA
- Founded: 2010
- Commissioner: KatieJo Svenson (Interim)
- Sports fielded: Women's lacrosse
- Division: Division III
- No. of teams: 6
- Headquarters: Minneapolis, Minnesota
- Region: Midwestern United States
- Official website: mlc-mwlc.org

The Midwest Women's Lacrosse Conference (MWLC) was a National Collegiate Athletic Association (NCAA) Division III women's lacrosse-only college athletic conference composed of schools located in the Midwestern United States. All schools are members of other conferences in other sports and formed the MWLC until such time as their existing conferences add lacrosse.

The Midwest Women's Lacrosse Conference (MWLC) was founded in 2010 and began play during the spring of 2011. The conference enters its 14th season in the spring of 2024.

The conference comprised NCAA Division III institutions located throughout the Midwest including Augsburg (Minneapolis, Minn.), Cornell (Mt. Vernon, Iowa), Hamline (Saint Paul, Minn.), Lake Forest (Lake Forest, Ill.), Northwestern (St. Paul, Minn.), and Saint Benedict (St. Joseph, Minn.).

Adrian, Albion and Trine left the Midwest Women's Lacrosse Conference after the 2012 season when the Michigan Intercollegiate Athletic Association (MIAA) began sponsoring women's lacrosse. The CCIW and HCAC institutions left the MWLC after the 2014 season along with Dubuque and Fontbonne.

Cornell, Illinois Institute of Technology, and Wartburg began conference play in the spring of 2015, joining members Aurora, Beloit, Benedictine, Concordia Wisconsin, and Loras. Augsburg and Concordia Chicago joined the spring of 2016, while Hamline and Monmouth joined the MWLC ranks in the spring of 2017. Marian and Northwestern became members in the spring of 2019.

At the conclusion of the 2020 season, the NACC institutions left the MWLC to compete in their core conference. Beloit departed after the 2021 season due to joining the NACC as an affiliate member. Loras also departed after the 2021 season due to suspending its program.

Lake Forest joined the MWLC in 2022 and Saint Benedict in 2023.

Monmouth and Wartburg departed after the 2023 season due to suspending their programs.

In 2024 the MWLC announced the discontinuation of the conference due to membership changes. Of the remaining members, Cornell and Lake Forest would join the NACC as affiliates, Augsburg, Hamline, and Saint Benedict would join the Wisconsin Intercollegiate Athletic Conference as affiliates, and Northwestern-St. Paul would discontinue its lacrosse programs following the 2024 season.

== Final Member Schools ==
Institution	City	State	Team Name	Affiliation	Enrollment	Primary Conference
Augsburg University	Minneapolis	Minnesota	Auggies	Private/Lutheran	3,000	MIAC
Cornell College	Mount Vernon	Iowa	Rams	Private/Methodist	1,197	Midwest
Hamline University	St. Paul	Minnesota	Pipers	Private/Methodist	2,100	MIAC
Lake Forest College	Lake Forest	Illinois	Foresters	Private/Non-sectarian	1,700	Midwest
Northwestern (Minn.)	Roseville	Minnesota	Eagles	Private (Nondenominational)	2,944	UMAC
College of Saint Benedict	St. Joseph	Minnesota	Bennies	Roman Catholic (Benedictines)	1,400	MIAC

== See also ==
- Midwest Lacrosse Conference
