= Western Intercollegiate Lacrosse Association =

- Conference: NCAA
- Founded: 2010
- Folded: 2015
- Commissioner: Chris Day
- Sports fielded: lacrosse; men's: 4; women's: none
- Division: Division II
- No. of teams: 4
- Headquarters: Alamosa, Colorado
- Region: Western US
- Website: http://www.hometeamsonline.com/teams/?u=WILA&s=lacrosse&t=c

Locations
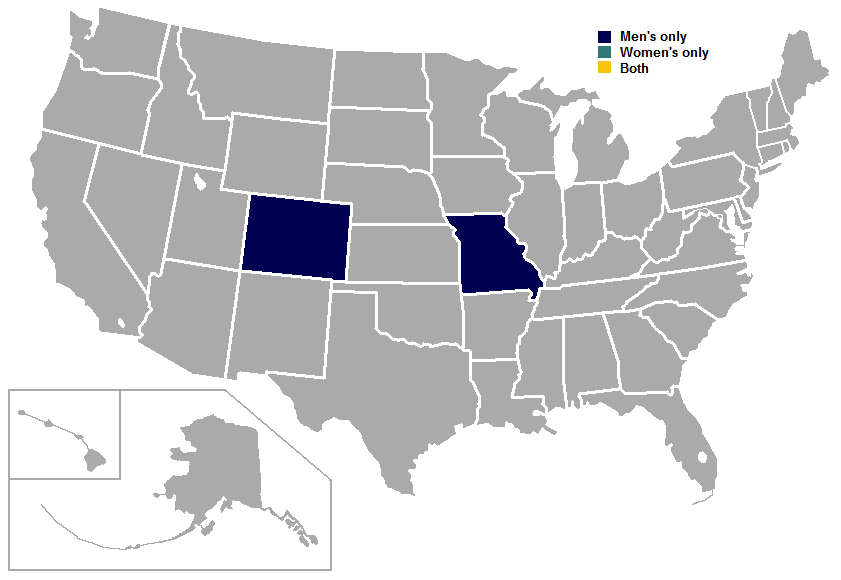

The Western Intercollegiate Lacrosse Association (WILA) was a National Collegiate Athletic Association (NCAA) Division II lacrosse-only college athletic conference composed of schools located in the Western United States. All schools are members of other conferences in other sports. WILA was formed at the beginning of the 2010–2011 academic year in order to name a champion (which does not involve a tournament), players of the week, and an all-league team at the end of the season. With no automatic qualifiers (AQ) currently in NCAA Division II men's lacrosse, conferences play a different role than in Division III.

The WILA is a loose confederation that not only assures games for its members, but also hopes to act as a catalyst for other NCAA Division II institutions looking to make a move to varsity lacrosse and eyeing stability. "It's what you need to do in non-traditional areas," said Notre Dame de Namur men's lacrosse coach Steve Dini. The WILA schedule features home-and-home contests with all schools. The 2010–2011 season included Adams State, Fort Lewis, Colorado Mesa and Regis competing in women's lacrosse, while Adams State, Dominican, Grand Canyon, Colorado Mesa and Notre Dame de Namur competed in men's lacrosse.

Lindenwood University joins the conference beginning with the 2011–2012 academic year with both men's and women's teams. They replaced Grand Canyon University, which left the conference at the end of the 2010–2011 season, after the university announced that their program would compete at the club level in the Men's Collegiate Lacrosse Association. The WILA concluded its second season in April 2012. Colorado Mesa won the association's men's championship with a conference record of 6-2; the championship was the first for Colorado Mesa in the program's second year of NCAA lacrosse competition. On the women's side, Lindenwood won the 2012 WILA women's lacrosse championship in the program's first season of NCAA competition. The Lady Lions recorded an 8-0 conference record en route to the title. The season saw additional membership changes when Lindenwood announced its men's program would join the new ECAC Division II Lacrosse League starting in the 2012–2013 academic year. The announcement was followed a week later by the addition of McKendree University's new women's lacrosse program starting in the 2012–2013 academic year.

Men's lacrosse was added as an official Rocky Mountain Athletic Conference sport starting in the 2015–2016 school year, essentially absorbing the WILA. Adams State, Colorado Mesa, and Colorado State–Pueblo are full members of the RMAC and is joined by Rockhurst as an affiliate member.

== Member schools ==
=== Final membership ===
Institution	Location	Nickname	Joined	Current Lacrosse Conference	Men	Women
Adams State University	Alamosa, Colorado	Grizzlies	2010	Rocky Mountain	✓	✗
Colorado Mesa University	Grand Junction, Colorado	Mavericks	2010	Rocky Mountain	✓	✗
Colorado State University–Pueblo	Pueblo, Colorado	ThunderWolves	2014	Rocky Mountain	✓	✗
Rockhurst University	Kansas City, Missouri	Hawks	2014	Rocky Mountain	✓	✗

=== Former men's members ===
Institution	Location	Nickname	Joined	Left	Current Lacrosse Conference
Dominican University of California	San Rafael, California	Penguins	2010	2014	Western Collegiate (MCLA D-I)
Grand Canyon University	Phoenix, Arizona	Antelopes	2010	2011	Southwestern Lacrosse (MCLA D-I)
Lindenwood University	St. Charles, Missouri	Lions	2011	2012	ECAC Lacrosse
Notre Dame de Namur University	Belmont, California	Argos	2010	2014	Defunct

=== Former women's members ===
Institution	Location	Nickname	Joined	Left	Current Lacrosse Conference
Adams State University	Alamosa, Colorado	Grizzlies	2010	2013	Rocky Mountain
Colorado Mesa University	Grand Junction, Colorado	Mavericks	2010	2013	Rocky Mountain
Fort Lewis College	Durango, Colorado	Skyhawks	2010	2013	Rocky Mountain
Lindenwood University	St. Charles, Missouri	Lions	2011	2013	Rocky Mountain
McKendree University	Lebanon, Illinois	Bearcats	2012	2013	Great Lakes
Regis University	Denver, Colorado	Rangers	2010	2013	Rocky Mountain

=== Membership timeline ===
Both Men Women

== Champions ==
Men's

- 2011: Notre Dame de Namur
- 2012: Colorado Mesa
- 2013: Dominican
- 2014: Dominican
- 2015: Colorado Mesa

Women's

- 2011: Regis
- 2012: Lindenwood
- 2013: Lindenwood
