= ECAC Division II Lacrosse League =

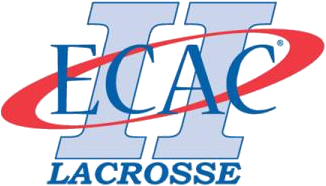
- Conference: NCAA
- Founded: 2012
- Folded: 2016; 10 years ago
- Commissioner: Rudy Keeling (since 2012)
- Sports fielded: 1; men's: 1; women's: 0
- Division: Division II
- No. of teams: 9
- Headquarters: Danbury, Connecticut
- Region: United States

Locations

The Eastern College Athletic Conference Division II Lacrosse League, also known as the ECAC Division II Lacrosse League, was an American NCAA Division II college athletic conference and part of the Eastern College Athletic Conference that only sponsors men's Division II lacrosse. The league was founded in March 2012 and began play in the 2012–13 academic year (2013 lacrosse season). The founding members included Alderson Broaddus University (then Alderson–Broaddus College), Lake Erie College, Lindenwood University, Mercyhurst University, Ohio Valley University, Seton Hill University, Walsh University, and Wheeling Jesuit University. The new conference brings together four former associate member in men's lacrosse only of the East Coast Conference: Lake Erie, Mercyhurst, Seton Hill, and Wheeling Jesuit; Lindenwood from the Western Intercollegiate Lacrosse Association; and Ohio Valley from competing as an Independent program; Walsh, in the program's first season of NCAA competition as part of the university's transition from NAIA; and Alderson-Broaddus, the program's first season in existence.

The league disbanded after the 2016 season when the Great Midwest Athletic Conference began sponsorship of men's lacrosse. Current G-MAC full members Alderson Broaddus and Ohio Valley were joined by affiliate and future G-MAC full members Lake Erie and Walsh with affiliate members Mercyhurst and Seton Hill of the Pennsylvania State Athletic Conference. Indianapolis, Lindenwood, and Wheeling Jesuit moved to independent status as a result of this move.

== Members ==
=== Former members ===
| Institution | Location | Nickname | Joined | Primary Conference |
|---|---|---|---|---|
| Alderson Broaddus University | Philippi, West Virginia | Battlers | 2012 | Great Midwest |
| University of Indianapolis | Indianapolis, Indiana | Greyhounds | 2015 | Great Lakes Valley |
| Lake Erie College | Painesville, Ohio | Storm | 2012 | Great Lakes (Great Midwest in 2017) |
| Lindenwood University | Saint Charles, Missouri | Lions | 2012 | Mid-America (Great Lakes Valley in 2019) |
| Mercyhurst University | Erie, Pennsylvania | Lakers | 2012 | Pennsylvania State |
| Ohio Valley University | Vienna, West Virginia | Fighting Scots | 2012 | Great Midwest |
| Seton Hill University | Greensburg, Pennsylvania | Griffins | 2012 | Pennsylvania State |
| Walsh University | North Canton, Ohio | Cavaliers | 2012 | Great Lakes (Great Midwest in 2017) |
| Wheeling Jesuit University | Wheeling, West Virginia | Cardinals | 2012 | Mountain East |

== Champions ==
=== Regular season ===
| Year | Team | Record |
|---|---|---|
| 2013 | Mercyhurst | 7–0 |
| 2014 | Mercyhurst | 6–1 |
| 2015 | Seton Hill | 6–1 |
| 2016 | Mercyhurst | 7–1 |

=== Conference tournament ===
==== 2013 ====
Erie, Pennsylvania
| Round | Team | Score | Team | Score |
|---|---|---|---|---|
| Semi 1 | (1) Mercyhurst | 14 | (4) Wheeling Jesuit | 3 |
| Semi 2 | (2) Seton Hill | 10 | (3) Lake Erie | 12 |
| Final | (1) Mercyhurst | 13 | (3) Lake Erie | 7 |

==== 2014 ====
Erie, Pennsylvania
| Round | Team | Score | Team | Score |
|---|---|---|---|---|
| Semi 1 | (1) Mercyhurst | 9 | (4) Seton Hill | 10 |
| Semi 2 | (2) Lake Erie | 9 | (3) Wheeling Jesuit | 7 |
| Final | (2) Lake Erie | 9 | (4) Seton Hill | 7 |

==== 2015 ====
Greensburg, Pennsylvania
| Round | Team | Score | Team | Score |
|---|---|---|---|---|
| Semi 1 | (1) Seton Hill | 7 | (4) Lindenwood | 9 |
| Semi 2 | (2) Lake Erie | 7 | (3) Mercyhurst | 6 |
| Final | (2) Lake Erie | 11 | (4) Lindenwood | 8 |

==== 2016 ====
Erie, Pennsylvania
| Round | Team | Score | Team | Score |
|---|---|---|---|---|
| Semi 1 | (1) Mercyhurst | 9 | (4) Indianapolis | 7 |
| Semi 2 | (2) Lake Erie | 6 | (3) Lindenwood | 8 |
| Final | (1) Mercyhurst | 11 | (3) Lindenwood | 7 |

== See also ==
- ECAC Lacrosse League, this league's Division I sister conference that disbanded in 2014
- Eastern College Athletic Conference
