= Ohio River Lacrosse Conference =

Midwestern lacrosse conference

The Ohio River Lacrosse Conference was a National Collegiate Athletic Association Division III men's and women's lacrosse conference located primarily in the midwestern United States. The conference was disbanded after the 2017-18 season.

== Member schools ==
=== Men’s only teams ===
The men's lacrosse teams of the Ohio River Lacrosse Conference comprise:

Institution	Location	Founded	Affiliation	Enrollment	Nickname	Joined (Note: Represents the calendar year when fall sports competition begins.)	Left (Note: Represents the calendar year when spring sports competition ends.)	Primary conference
Bethany College	Bethany, West Virginia	1840	Disciples of Christ	650	Bison	2014	2018	Presidents' (PAC)
Chatham University (Note: This institution is a former women's college, which has eventually turned into a co-educational college (Chatham since 2015–16).)	Pittsburgh, Pennsylvania	1869	Nonsectarian	2,300	Cougars	2017	2018	Presidents' (PAC)
Defiance College	Defiance, Ohio	1850	United Church of Christ	505	Yellow Jackets	2014	2016	Wolverine–Hoosier (WHAC) (Note: Currently an NAIA athletic conference.)
Earlham College	Richmond, Indiana	1847	Quaker	612	Quakers	2017	2018	Heartland (HCAC)
Grove City College	Grove City, Pennsylvania	1876	Nondenominational (Note: Formerly affiliated with the Presbyterian Church (USA).)	2,500	Wolverines	2017	2018	Presidents' (PAC)
Hanover College	Hanover, Indiana	1827	Presbyterian	1,068	Panthers	2014	2018	Heartland (HCAC)
Mount St. Joseph University	Delhi Township, Ohio (Note: Mailing address is located in Cincinnati.)	1920	Catholic (S.C.C.)	1,889	Lions	2014	2018	Heartland (HCAC)
Saint Vincent College	Latrobe, Pennsylvania	1846	Catholic (Benedictines)	1,652	Bearcats	2014	2018	Presidents' (PAC)
Thiel College	Greenville, Pennsylvania	1866	Lutheran ELCA	790	Tomcats	2014	2018	Presidents' (PAC)
Transylvania University	Lexington, Kentucky	1780	Disciples of Christ	963	Pioneers	2014	2018	Heartland (HCAC)
Washington & Jefferson College	Washington, Pennsylvania	1781	Nonsectarian	1,519	Presidents	2014	2018	Presidents' (PAC)
Westminster College	New Wilmington, Pennsylvania	1852	Presbyterian	1,482	Titans	2015	2018	Presidents' (PAC)

=== Women’s only teams ===
The women's lacrosse teams of the Ohio River Lacrosse Conference comprise:

Institution	Location	Founded	Affiliation	Enrollment	Nickname	Joined (Note: Represents the calendar year when fall sports competition begins.)	Left (Note: Represents the calendar year when spring sports competition ends.)	Primary conference
Chatham University (Note: This institution is a former women's college, which has eventually turned into a co-educational college (Chatham since 2015–16).)	Pittsburgh, Pennsylvania	1869	Nonsectarian	2,300	Cougars	2017	2018	Presidents' (PAC)
Defiance College	Defiance, Ohio	1850	United Church of Christ	505	Yellow Jackets	2014	2015	Wolverine–Hoosier (WHAC) (Note: Currently an NAIA athletic conference.)
Earlham College	Richmond, Indiana	1847	Quaker	612	Quakers	2017	2018	Heartland (HCAC)
Franklin College	Franklin, Indiana	1834	Baptist	1,047	Grizzlies	2014	2018	Heartland (HCAC)
Hanover College	Hanover, Indiana	1827	Presbyterian	1,068	Panthers	2014	2018	Heartland (HCAC)
Mount St. Joseph University	Delhi Township, Ohio (Note: Mailing address is located in Cincinnati.)	1920	Catholic (S.C.C.)	1,889	Lions	2014	2018	Heartland (HCAC)
Saint Vincent College	Latrobe, Pennsylvania	1846	Catholic (Benedictines)	1,652	Bearcats	2014	2018	Presidents' (PAC)
Thiel College	Greenville, Pennsylvania	1866	Lutheran ELCA	790	Tomcats	2014	2018	Presidents' (PAC)
Thomas More University	Crestview Hills, Kentucky	1921	Catholic (Benedictine Sisters)	1,900	Saints	2014	2018	Great Midwest (G-MAC) (Note: Currently an NCAA Division II athletic conference.)
Transylvania University	Lexington, Kentucky	1780	Disciples of Christ	963	Pioneers	2014	2018	Heartland (HCAC)
Washington & Jefferson College	Washington, Pennsylvania	1781	Nonsectarian	1,519	Presidents	2014	2018	Presidents' (PAC)
Waynesburg University	Waynesburg, Pennsylvania	1849	Presbyterian	1,500	Yellow Jackets	2014	2018	Presidents' (PAC)
Westminster College	New Wilmington, Pennsylvania	1852	Presbyterian	1,482	Titans	2016	2018	Presidents' (PAC)

== See also ==
- Lacrosse
