= NAIA women's outdoor track and field championship =

Annual college track meet

- Sport: Outdoor track and field
- Founded: 1981
- Country: United States and Canada
- Most recent champion: British Columbia (6)
- Website: NAIA.com

The NAIA women's outdoor track and field championship is the annual track meet to determine the national champions of NAIA women's outdoor track and field in the United States and Canada. It has been held annually since 1981.

The most successful program has been Prairie View A&M, with nine NAIA national titles. Among active NAIA programs, British Columbia have six titles and Wayland Baptist have four titles.

The current champions are British Columbia, who won their sixth national title in 2026.

== Results ==
NAIA women's outdoor track and field championships
Year	Site	Championship results			
Year	Site	Winner	Points	Runners-up	Points
1981; Details	(Texas); Houston, TX	Texas Southern	115.5	Prairie View A&M	68
1982; Details	(West Virginia); Charleston, WV	Prairie View A&M	117	Adams State	73
1983; Details	(West Virginia); Charleston, WV	Prairie View A&M (2)	119	Hampton	90
1984; Details	(West Virginia); Charleston, WV	Prairie View A&M (3)	100	Adams State	83
1985; Details	(Michigan); Hillsdale, MI	Prairie View A&M (4)	109	Adams State	63.5
1986; Details	(Arkansas); Russellville, AR	Prairie View A&M (5)	117	Wayland Baptist	110
1987; Details	(Arkansas); Russellville, AR	Prairie View A&M (6)	144	Wayland Baptist	86
1988; Details	(California); Azusa, CA	Prairie View A&M (7)	144	Wayland Baptist	86
1989; Details	(California); Azusa, CA	Prairie View A&M (8)	109	Arkansas–Pine Bluff; Concordia Nebraska	50
1990; Details	(Texas); Stephenville, TX	Prairie View A&M (9)	103	Vacant	
1991; Details	(Texas); Stephenville, TX	Central State (OH)	115	Simon Fraser	81
1992; Details	(British Columbia); Abbotsford, BC	Central State (OH) (2)	140	Simon Fraser	125.5
1993; Details	(British Columbia); Abbotsford, BC	Central State (OH) (3)	132	Simon Fraser	116
1994; Details	(California); Azusa, CA	Central State (OH) (4)	96	Doane	71
1995; Details	(California); Azusa, CA	Southern–New Orleans	104 1/3	Central State (OH)	103
1996; Details	(Georgia (U.S. state)); Marietta, GA	Central State (OH) (5)	108	Azusa Pacific	65.5
1997; Details	(Georgia (U.S. state)); Marietta, GA	Southern–New Orleans (2)	80	Mary (ND)	64
1998; Details	(Oklahoma); Tulsa, OK	Simon Fraser	84	Mary (ND)	62
1999; Details	(Florida); Palm Beach Gardens, FL	McKendree	127	Life	72
2000; Details	(British Columbia); Abbotsford, BC	Life	156	McKendree	108
2001; Details	(British Columbia); Abbotsford, BC	Doane; Life (2)	59	Central State (OH)	56
2002; Details	(Kansas); Olathe, KS	Doane (2)	67	Azusa Pacific	60
2003; Details	(Kansas); Olathe, KS	Azusa Pacific	86	Lindenwood	78
2004; Details	(Kentucky); Louisville, KY	Azusa Pacific (2)	104	Lindenwood	76
2005; Details	(Kentucky); Louisville, KY	Simon Fraser (2)	79 1/2	Oklahoma Baptist	64
2006; Details	(California); Fresno, CA	Missouri Baptist	126	Azusa Pacific	79
2007; Details	(California); Fresno, CA	Azusa Pacific (3)	73	Cedarville	58
2008; Details	(Illinois); Edwardsville, IL	Wayland Baptist	80	Simon Fraser	69
2009; Details	(Illinois); Edwardsville, IL	Wayland Baptist (2)	102	Oklahoma Baptist	58
2010; Details	(Indiana); Marion, IN	Azusa Pacific (4)	61	Oklahoma Baptist	60
2011; Details	(Indiana); Marion, IN	Concordia Oregon	86	Oklahoma Baptist	69.5
2012; Details	(Indiana); Marion, IN	Oklahoma Baptist	101.5	Concordia Oregon	81
2013; Details	(Indiana); Marion, IN	Indiana Tech	122	Oklahoma Baptist	82.7
2014; Details	(Alabama); Gulf Shores, AL	Indiana Tech (2)	102	Oklahoma Baptist	101
2015; Details	(Alabama); Gulf Shores, AL	Wayland Baptist (3)	91	Oklahoma Baptist	66
2016; Details	(Alabama); Gulf Shores, AL	Concordia Nebraska	71	Indiana Tech	66
2017; Details	(Alabama); Gulf Shores, AL	Wayland Baptist (4)	75	Indiana Tech	56
2018; Details	(Alabama); Gulf Shores, AL	Southern–New Orleans (3)	64	British Columbia	62
2019; Details	(Alabama); Gulf Shores, AL	British Columbia	91	Southern–New Orleans	88
2020	Canceled due to the coronavirus pandemic				
2021; Details	(Alabama); Gulf Shores, AL	Indiana Tech (3)	84	William Carey	65
2022; Details	(Alabama); Gulf Shores, AL	British Columbia (2)	138	Indiana Tech	94
2023; Details	(Indiana); Marion, IN	British Columbia (3)	104	William Carey	71
2024; Details	(Indiana); Marion, IN	British Columbia (4)	137	William Carey	83
2025; Details	(Indiana); Marion, IN	British Columbia (5)	105	Life	77
2026; Details	(North Carolina); Asheville, NC	British Columbia (6)	101.5	Cumberlands (KY)	52
2027; Details	(North Carolina); Asheville, NC				

== Champions ==
=== Active NAIA programs ===
Team	Titles	Years
British Columbia	6	2019, 2022, 2023, 2024, 2025, 2026
Wayland Baptist	4	2008, 2009, 2015, 2017
Indiana Tech	3	2013, 2014, 2021
Southern New Orleans	3	1995, 1997, 2018
Doane	2	2001*, 2002
Life	2	2000, 2001*
Concordia Nebraska	1	2016
Missouri Baptist	1	2006

==== Former NAIA programs ====
Team	Titles	Years
Prairie View A&M	9	1982, 1983, 1984, 1985, 1986, 1987, 1988, 1989, 1990
Central State (OH)	5	1991, 1992, 1993, 1994, 1996
Azusa Pacific	4	2003, 2004, 2007, 2010
Simon Fraser	2	1998, 2005
Oklahoma Baptist	1	2012
Concordia Oregon	1	2011
McKendree	1	1999
Texas Southern	1	1981

== See also ==
- NAIA track and field
  - NAIA men's outdoor track and field championship
  - NAIA men's indoor track and field championship
  - NAIA women's indoor track and field championship
- NCAA track and field
  - NCAA men's outdoor track and field championships (Division I, Division II, Division III)
  - NCAA women's outdoor track and field championships (Division I, Division II, Division III)
  - NCAA men's indoor track and field championships (Division I, Division II, Division III)
  - NCAA women's indoor track and field championships (Division I, Division II, Division III)
