= NAIA men's indoor track and field championship =

Annual college track meet

- Sport: Indoor track and field
- Founded: 1966
- Country: United States
- Most recent champion: Marian (IN) (2nd)
- Most titles: Azusa Pacific (8)
- Website: NAIA.com

The NAIA men's indoor track and field championship is the annual track meet to determine the national champions of NAIA men's indoor track and field in the United States and Canada. It has been held annually since 1966.

The most successful program has been Azusa Pacific, with 8 NAIA national titles.

Marian (IN) are the reigning national champions, winning their second title in 2026.

== Results ==
NAIA men's indoor track and field championships
Year	Site	Championship results			
Year	Site	Winner	Points	Runners-up	Points
1966; Details	Kansas City, MO	Southern–Baton Rouge	87	Fort Hays Kansas State	72
1967; Details	Kansas City, MO	Southern–Baton Rouge (2)	102	Texas Southern	92
1968; Details	Kansas City, MO	Prairie View A&M	70	Texas Southern	67½
1969; Details	Kansas City, MO	Eastern Michigan	96⅓	Prairie View A&M	52
1970; Details	Kansas City, MO	Eastern Michigan (2)	73	Prairie View A&M	31
1971; Details	Kansas City, MO	Eastern Michigan (3)	66¾	Dallas Baptist	32
1972; Details	Kansas City, MO	Dallas Baptist	30	Prairie View A&M	27
1973; Details	Kansas City, MO	Jackson State	43	Eastern New Mexico	37
1974; Details	Kansas City, MO	Texas Southern	45	Jackson State	41
1975; Details	Greensboro, NC	Jackson State (2)	57	Eastern New Mexico	46
1976; Details	Greensboro, NC	Jackson State (3)	78	Eastern New Mexico	33.17
1977; Details	Kansas City, MO	Jackson State (4)	85	Oklahoma Christian; Southern–Baton Rouge	38
1978; Details	Kansas City, MO	Abilene Christian; Jackson State (5)	75	Southern–Baton Rouge	48
1979; Details	Kansas City, MO	Jackson State (6)	73	Abilene Christian	53½
1980; Details	Kansas City, MO	Vacant		Prairie View A&M	53½
1981; Details	Kansas City, MO	Texas Southern (2)	80	Jackson State	51
1982; Details	Kansas City, MO	Saginaw Valley State	68	Texas Southern; Abilene Christian	63
1983; Details	Kansas City, MO	Saginaw Valley State (2)	79	Texas Southern	68
1984; Details	Kansas City, MO	Texas Southern (3)	70	Wayland Baptist	62
1985; Details	Kansas City, MO	Wayland Baptist	78	Texas Southern	56
1986; Details	Kansas City, MO	Wayland Baptist (2)	125	Adams State	67
1987; Details	Kansas City, MO	Wayland Baptist (3)	115	Azusa Pacific	62½
1988; Details	Kansas City, MO	Wayland Baptist (4)	112	Azusa Pacific	75
1989; Details	Kansas City, MO	Wayland Baptist (5)	102	Azusa Pacific	59⅓
1990; Details	Kansas City, MO	Adams State	58	Azusa Pacific	44
1991; Details	Kansas City, MO	Lubbock Christian	66	Azusa Pacific	60
1992; Details	Kansas City, MO	Adams State (2)	82	Azusa Pacific	72
1993; Details	Kansas City, MO	Central State (OH)	77	Lubbock Christian	70
1994; Details	Kansas City, MO	Central State (OH) (2)	84	Azusa Pacific	76
1995; Details	Lincoln, NE	Lubbock Christian (2)	108	Azusa Pacific	97
1996; Details	Lincoln, NE	Azusa Pacific	91	Oklahoma Baptist	83
1997; Details	Lincoln, NE	Life	63	California Baptist	56
1998; Details	Lincoln, NE	Lindenwood	62	Azusa Pacific	56
1999; Details	Lincoln, NE	California Baptist	87	Lindenwood	72
2000; Details	Lincoln, NE	Life (2)	71	Concordia (NE)	46
2001; Details	Johnson City, TN	McKendree	59	Azusa Pacific	48½
2002; Details	Johnson City, TN	Azusa Pacific (2)	72	Doane	37½
2003; Details	Johnson City, TN	Azusa Pacific (3)	61	MidAmerica Nazarene	43½
2004; Details	Johnson City, TN	Azusa Pacific (4)	75	Lindenwood	47⅓
2005; Details	Johnson City, TN	Lindenwood (2)	100¼	Virginia Intermont	82
2006; Details	Johnson City, TN	Lindenwood (3)	94½	Virginia Intermont	81
2007; Details	Johnson City, TN	Azusa Pacific (5)	83	Oklahoma Baptist	62
2008; Details	Johnson City, TN	Azusa Pacific (6)	64¾	Oklahoma Baptist	64
2009; Details	Johnson City, TN	Azusa Pacific (7)	78½	Dickinson State	55
2010; Details	Johnson City, TN	Azusa Pacific (8)	71	Wayland Baptist	56
2011; Details	Geneva, OH	Shorter	44	Wayland Baptist	41
2012; Details	Geneva, OH	Wayland Baptist (6)	108	Shorter	72
2013; Details	Geneva, OH	Oklahoma Baptist	86½	Wayland Baptist	70
2014; Details	Geneva, OH	Indiana Tech	82	Wayland Baptist	69
2015; Details	Geneva, OH	Indiana Tech (2)	76	Wayland Baptist	71
2016; Details	Johnson City, TN	Indiana Tech (3)	105	Wayland Baptist	77
2017; Details	Johnson City, TN	Indiana Tech (4)	118	Concordia (NE)	57
2018; Details	Pittsburg, KS	Wayland Baptist (7)	88	Indiana Tech	80
2019; Details	Brookings, SD	Indiana Tech (5)	56	Wayland Baptist	52
2020; Details	Brookings, SD	William Carey	82	Olivet Nazarene	50
2021; Details	Yankton, SD	Indiana Tech (6)	51.5	Dordt	47
2022; Details	Brookings, SD	Oklahoma City	62	Indiana Tech	59
2023; Details	Brookings, SD	Southeastern	45	Life	40
2024; Details	Brookings, SD	Cumberlands	80	Dordt	41
2025; Details	Gainesville, FL	Marian (IN)	74	Cumberlands	64
2026; Details	Gainesville, FL	Marian (IN) (2)	66	Cumberlands	52

== Champions ==
=== Active NAIA programs ===
Team	Titles	Years
Wayland Baptist	7	1985, 1986, 1987, 1988, 1989, 2012, 2018
Indiana Tech	6	2014, 2015, 2016, 2017, 2019, 2021
Marian (IN)	2	2025, 2026
Life	2	1997, 2000
Cumberlands	1	2024
Southeastern	1	2023
Oklahoma City	1	2022
William Carey	1	2019

=== Former NAIA programs ===
Team	Titles	Years
Azusa Pacific	8	1996, 2002, 2003, 2004, 2007, 2008, 2009, 2010
Jackson State	6	1973, 1975, 1976, 1977, 1978, 1979
Texas Southern	3	1974, 1981, 1984
Eastern Michigan	3	1969, 1970 1971
Lindenwood	2	1995, 1996
Central State (OH)	2	1993, 1994
Adams State	2	1990, 1992
Saginaw Valley State	2	1982, 1983
Southern	2	1966, 1967
Oklahoma Baptist	1	2013
Shorter	1	2011
McKendree	1	2001
Lubbock Christian	1	1995
Abilene Christian	1	1978
Dallas Baptist	1	1972
Prairie View A&M	1	1968

== See also ==
- NAIA track and field
  - NAIA men's outdoor track and field championship
  - NAIA women's indoor track and field championship
  - NAIA women's outdoor track and field championship
- NCAA track and field
  - NCAA men's indoor track and field championships (Division I, Division II, Division III)
  - NCAA women's indoor track and field championships (Division I, Division II, Division III)
  - NCAA men's outdoor track and field championships (Division I, Division II, Division III)
  - NCAA women's outdoor track and field championships (Division I, Division II, Division III)
