= NAIA men's outdoor track and field championship =

Annual college track meet

- Sport: Outdoor track and field
- Founded: 1952
- Country: United States; Canada
- Most recent champion: Cumberlands (2nd)
- Website: NAIA.com

The NAIA men's outdoor track and field championship is the annual track meet to determine the national champions of NAIA men's outdoor track and field in the United States and Canada. It has been held annually since 1952.

The most successful program has been Azusa Pacific, with fifteen NAIA national titles. Among active NAIA programs, Life have the most, with six.

The current champions are Cumberlands, who won their second national title in 2026.

== Results ==
NAIA men's outdoor track and field championships
Year	Site	Championship results			
Year	Site	Winner	Points	Runners-up	Points
1952; Details	(Texas); Abilene, TX	Abilene Christian	74	San Diego State	45
1953; Details	(Texas); Abilene, TX	South Dakota State	48	Abilene Christian	42
1954; Details	(Texas); Abilene, TX	Abilene Christian (2)	39	Texas Southern	33
1955; Details	(Texas); Abilene, TX	Abilene Christian (3)	68	Kansas State Teachers	44
1956; Details	(California); San Diego, CA	Occidental	89½	Abilene Christian	56
1957; Details	(California); San Diego, CA	Occidental (2)	148½	Abilene Christian	34
1958; Details	(California); San Diego, CA	Occidental (3)	93	Winston-Salem State	62
1959; Details	(South Dakota); Sioux Falls, SD	Winston-Salem State	56	East Texas State	55
1960; Details	(South Dakota); Sioux Falls, SD	Winston-Salem State (2)	58	East Texas State	45
1961; Details	(South Dakota); Sioux Falls, SD	Texas Southern	49	Tennessee State	47
1962; Details	(South Dakota); Sioux Falls, SD	Texas Southern (2)	72½	Kansas State Teachers	46
1963; Details	(South Dakota); Sioux Falls, SD	Maryland State	82	Omaha	33
1964; Details	(South Dakota); Sioux Falls, SD	Kansas State Teachers	60	North Carolina College	50
1965; Details	(South Dakota); Sioux Falls, SD	Southern–Baton Rouge	77	North Carolina College	40
1966; Details	(South Dakota); Sioux Falls, SD	Southern–Baton Rouge (2)	92	Texas Southern	69
1967; Details	(South Dakota); Sioux Falls, SD	Southern–Baton Rouge (3)	77	Texas Southern	63
1968; Details	(Montana); Billings, MT	Prairie View A&M	47	Arkansas AM&N	45
1969; Details	(Montana); Billings, MT	Prairie View A&M (2)	69½	Southern–Baton Rouge	68
1970; Details	(Montana); Billings, MT	Eastern Michigan	75	Texas Southern	50
1971; Details	(Montana); Billings, MT	Eastern Michigan (2)	65	North Carolina Central	43
1972; Details	(Montana); Billings, MT	North Carolina Central	68	Dallas Baptist	51
1973; Details	(Arkansas); Arkadelphia, AR	Texas Southern (3)	81	Eastern New Mexico	55
1974; Details	(Arkansas); Arkadelphia, AR	Eastern New Mexico	67	Southern California College	58
1975; Details	(Arkansas); Arkadelphia, AR	Southeastern Louisiana	68	Eastern New Mexico	63
1976; Details	(Arkansas); Arkadelphia, AR	Eastern New Mexico (2)	56	Northwestern State (LA)	52
1977; Details	(Arkansas); Arkadelphia, AR	Jackson State	56	Adams State	31
1978; Details	(Texas); Abilene, TX	Abilene Christian (4)	67	Adams State	42
1979; Details	(Texas); Abilene, TX	Texas Southern (4)	87	Abilene Christian	53
1980; Details	(Texas); Abilene, TX	Mississippi Valley State	66	Abilene Christian	61
1981; Details	(Texas); Houston, TX	Mississippi Valley State (2)	62	Texas Southern	59
1982; Details	(West Virginia); Charleston, WV	Abilene Christian (5)	80	Azusa Pacific	64
1983; Details	(West Virginia); Charleston, WV	Azusa Pacific	94	Saginaw Valley State	36
1984; Details	(West Virginia); Charleston, WV	Azusa Pacific (2)	93	Saginaw Valley State	77
1985; Details	(Michigan); Hillsdale, MI	Azusa Pacific (3)	94	Wayland Baptist	76
1986; Details	(Arkansas); Russellville, AR	Azusa Pacific (4)	112	Wayland Baptist	86
1987; Details	(Arkansas); Russellville, AR	Azusa Pacific (5)	108	Wayland Baptist	82
1988; Details	(California); Azusa, CA	Azusa Pacific (6)	112	Prairie View A&M	63
1989; Details	(California); Azusa, CA	Azusa Pacific (7)	115	Adams State	70
1990; Details	(Texas); Stephenville, TX	Oklahoma Baptist	57	Azusa Pacific	53
1991; Details	(Texas); Stephenville, TX	Azusa Pacific (8)	87	Central State (OH); Lubbock Christian	42
1992; Details	(British Columbia); Abbotsford, BC	Azusa Pacific (9)	93	Central State (OH)	76
1993; Details	(British Columbia); Abbotsford, BC	Central State (OH)	99	Prairie View A&M	70
1994; Details	(California); Azusa, CA	Azusa Pacific (10)	82	Central State (OH)	66
1995; Details	(California); Azusa, CA	Azusa Pacific (11)	105⅓	Lubbock Christian	104
1996; Details	(Georgia (U.S. state)); Marietta, GA	Lubbock Christian	59	Azusa Pacific	54
1997; Details	(Georgia (U.S. state)); Marietta, GA	Life	94	Prairie View A&M	54.6
1998; Details	(Oklahoma); Tulsa, OK	Life (2)	82	Southern–New Orleans	79
1999; Details	(Florida); Palm Beach Gardens, FL	Life (3)	102	Lindenwood	80
2000; Details	(British Columbia); Abbotsford, BC	Life (4)	90	Taylor; Point Loma Nazarene	53
2001; Details	(British Columbia); Abbotsford, BC	Azusa Pacific (12)	97	Life	50
2002; Details	(Kansas); Olathe, KS	Azusa Pacific (13)	54	Life	50
2003; Details	(Kansas); Olathe, KS	Lindenwood	65	Dickinson State	61
2004; Details	(Kentucky); Louisville, KY	Dickinson State	91	Lindenwood	72
2005; Details	(Kentucky); Louisville, KY	Dickinson State (2)	99	Virginia Intermont	83
2006; Details	(California); Fresno, CA	Dickinson State (3)	102	Lindenwood	89
2007; Details	(California); Fresno, CA	Oklahoma Baptist (2)	77	Dickinson State	58
2008; Details	(Illinois); Edwardsville, IL	Azusa Pacific (14)	61	Dickinson State	57
2009; Details	(Illinois); Edwardsville, IL	Azusa Pacific (15)	80	Dickinson State	71
2010; Details	(Indiana); Marion, IN	Wayland Baptist	70	Dickinson State	51
2011; Details	(Indiana); Marion, IN	Shorter	66	Doane	59
2012; Details	(Indiana); Marion, IN	Shorter (2)	93	Azusa Pacific	69
2013; Details	(Indiana); Marion, IN	Indiana Tech	72	Oklahoma Baptist	68
2014; Details	(Alabama); Gulf Shores, AL	Indiana Tech (2)	105	Wayland Baptist	93
2015; Details	(Alabama); Gulf Shores, AL	Concordia Nebraska	59	Wayland Baptist	55
2016; Details	(Alabama); Gulf Shores, AL	Indiana Tech (3)	86	Concordia (NE)	52
2017; Details	(Alabama); Gulf Shores, AL	British Columbia	71	Indiana Tech	64
2018; Details	(Alabama); Gulf Shores, AL	Wiley	92	Indiana Tech	62
2019; Details	(Alabama); Gulf Shores, AL	British Columbia (2)	80	William Carey	53
2020	Canceled due to the coronavirus pandemic				
2021; Details	(Alabama); Gulf Shores, AL	Madonna; Doane	44	Indiana Tech	43
2022; Details	(Alabama); Gulf Shores, AL	Life (5)	52	Southeastern University	47
2023; Details	(Indiana); Marion, IN	Life (6)	55	British Columbia	41
2024; Details	(Indiana); Marion, IN	Cumberlands	64	Marian (IN)	62
2025; Details	(Indiana); Marion, IN	British Columbia (3)	74	Madonna	53
2026; Details	(North Carolina); Asheville, NC	Cumberlands (2)	79	Indiana Tech	49.2
2027; Details	(North Carolina); Asheville, NC				

== Champions ==
=== Active NAIA programs ===
Team	Titles	Years
Life	6	1997, 1998, 1999, 2000, 2022, 2023
Dickinson State	3	2004, 2005, 2006
Indiana Tech	3	2013, 2014, 2016
British Columbia	3	2017, 2019, 2025
Cumberlands	2	2024, 2026
Doane	1	2021*
Madonna	1	2021*
Wiley	1	2018
Concordia Nebraska	1	2015
Wayland Baptist	1	2010

==== Former NAIA programs ====
Team	Titles	Years
Azusa Pacific	15	1983, 1984, 1985, 1986, 1987, 1988, 1989, 1991, 1992, 1994, 1995, 2001, 2002, 2008, 2009
Abilene Christian	5	1952, 1954, 1955, 1978, 1982
Texas Southern	4	1961, 1962, 1973, 1979
Southern	3	1965, 1966, 1967
Occidental	3	1956, 1957, 1958
Shorter	2	2011, 2012
Oklahoma Baptist	2	1990, 2007
Mississippi Valley State	2	1980, 1981
Eastern New Mexico	2	1974, 1976
Eastern Michigan	2	1970, 1971
Prairie View A&M	2	1968, 1969
Winston-Salem State	2	1959, 1960
Lindenwood	1	2003
Lubbock Christian	1	1996
Central State (OH)	1	1993
Jackson State	1	1977
Southeastern Louisiana	1	1975
North Carolina Central	1	1972
Emporia State	1	1964
UMES	1	1963
South Dakota State	1	1953

== See also ==
- NAIA track and field
  - NAIA women's outdoor track and field championship
  - NAIA men's indoor track and field championship
  - NAIA women's indoor track and field championship
- NCAA track and field
  - NCAA men's outdoor track and field championships (Division I, Division II, Division III)
  - NCAA women's outdoor track and field championships (Division I, Division II, Division III)
  - NCAA men's indoor track and field championships (Division I, Division II, Division III)
  - NCAA women's indoor track and field championships (Division I, Division II, Division III)
