= NAIA women's indoor track and field championship =

Annual college track meet

- Sport: Indoor track and field
- Founded: 1981
- Country: United States and Canada
- Most recent champion: Marian (IN) (1st)
- Most titles: Wayland Baptist (8)
- Website: NAIA.com

The NAIA women's indoor track and field championship is the annual track meet to determine the national champions of NAIA women's indoor track and field in the United States and Canada. It has been held annually since 1981.

Wayland Baptist have been the most successful program, with eight national titles.

The reigning champions are Marian (IN), who won their first national championship in 2026.

== Results ==
NAIA women's indoor track and field championships
Year	Site	Championship results			
Year	Site	Winner	Points	Runners-up	Points
1981; Details	Kansas City, MO	Jackson State	149	Adams State	53
1982; Details	Kansas City, MO	Texas Southern	101.5	Prairie View A&M	74
1983; Details	Kansas City, MO	Texas Southern (2)	111	Prairie View A&M	83
1984; Details	Kansas City, MO	Prairie View A&M	92	Texas Southern	62
1985; Details	Kansas City, MO	Adams State	67	Prairie View A&M	64
1986; Details	Kansas City, MO	Wayland Baptist	106	Prairie View A&M	96
1987; Details	Kansas City, MO	Prairie View A&M (2)	108	Wayland Baptist	81
1988; Details	Kansas City, MO	Wayland Baptist (2)	84	Prairie View A&M	82.5
1989; Details	Kansas City, MO	Midland Lutheran	64	Prairie View A&M	63.6
1990; Details	Kansas City, MO	Simon Fraser	84	Prairie View A&M	67
1991; Details	Kansas City, MO	Prairie View A&M (3)	72	Central State (OH)	61
1992; Details	Kansas City, MO	Simon Fraser (2)	94	Central State (OH)	86
1993; Details	Kansas City, MO	Central State (OH)	97	Wayland Baptist	65
1994; Details	Kansas City, MO	Wayland Baptist (3)	80	Central State (OH)	57
1995; Details	Lincoln, NE	Southern–New Orleans	90	Central State (OH)	71
1996; Details	Lincoln, NE	Central State (OH) (2)	96	Wayland Baptist	86
1997; Details	Lincoln, NE	Southern–New Orleans (2)	86	Simon Fraser	60
1998; Details	Lincoln, NE	Simon Fraser (3)	73	Mary (ND)	65
1999; Details	Lincoln, NE	McKendree	96	Mary (ND)	64
2000; Details	Lincoln, NE	McKendree (2)	125	Life (GA)	113
2001; Details	Johnson City, TN	McKendree (3)	66	Life (GA)	64
2002; Details	Johnson City, TN	McKendree (4)	77	Azusa Pacific	75
2003; Details	Johnson City, TN	Azusa Pacific	121	Doane	51
2004; Details	Johnson City, TN	Azusa Pacific (2)	95	Simon Fraser	65
2005; Details	Johnson City, TN	Oklahoma Baptist	86.5	McKendree	72
2006; Details	Johnson City, TN	Missouri Baptist	172	Simon Fraser	92
2007; Details	Johnson City, TN	Oklahoma Baptist (2)	52.33	Wayland Baptist	51
2008; Details	Johnson City, TN	Wayland Baptist (4)	71	Azusa Pacific	70
2009; Details	Johnson City, TN	Wayland Baptist (5)	68	Azusa Pacific	67
2010; Details	Johnson City, TN	Oklahoma Baptist (3)	68	Wayland Baptist	67
2011; Details	Geneva, OH	Oklahoma Baptist (4)	75	Simon Fraser	58
2012; Details	Geneva, OH	Azusa Pacific (3)	108	Oklahoma Baptist	107
2013; Details	Geneva, OH	Oklahoma Baptist (5)	113	Indiana Tech	87
2014; Details	Geneva, OH	Oklahoma Baptist (6)	133	Indiana Tech	123
2015; Details	Geneva, OH	Oklahoma Baptist (7)	87	Indiana Tech	79
2016; Details	Johnson City, TN	Wayland Baptist (6)	72	Doane	61.5
2017; Details	Johnson City, TN	Indiana Tech	75	Oklahoma City	59
2018; Details	Pittsburg, KS	Wayland Baptist (7)	100	Indiana Tech	69
2019; Details	Brookings, SD	Wayland Baptist (8)	83	Indiana Tech	54
2020; Details	Brookings, SD	Huntington (IN)	77	William Carey	71
2021; Details	Yankton, SD	Indiana Tech (2)	111	William Carey	63
2022; Details	Brookings, SD	Indiana Tech (3)	127	William Carey	55
2023; Details	Brookings, SD	Indiana Tech (4)	85	Huntington (IN)	64
2024; Details	Brookings, SD	Indiana Tech (5)	88	William Carey	79
2025; Details	Gainesville, FL	Cumberlands (KY)	58	Doane	48
2026; Details	Gainesville, FL	Marian (IN)	51	Dickinson State	41

== Champions ==
=== Active NAIA programs ===
Team	Titles	Years
Wayland Baptist	8	1986, 1988, 1994, 2008, 2009, 2016, 2018, 2019
Indiana Tech	5	2017, 2021, 2022, 2023, 2024
Southern New Orleans	2	1995, 1997
Cumberlands (KY)	1	2025
Huntington (IN)	1	2020
Marian (IN)	1	2026
Midland	1	1989
Missouri Baptist	1	2006

=== Former NAIA programs ===
Team	Titles	Years
Oklahoma Baptist	7	2005, 2007, 2010, 2011, 2013, 2014, 2015
McKendree	4	1999, 2000, 2001, 2002
Azusa Pacific	3	2003, 2004, 2012
Prairie View A&M	3	1984, 1987, 1991
Simon Fraser	3	1990, 1992, 1998
Central State (OH)	2	1993, 1996
Texas Southern	2	1982, 1983
Adams State	1	1985
Jackson State	1	1981

== See also ==
- NAIA track and field
  - NAIA women's outdoor track and field championship
  - NAIA men's indoor track and field championship
  - NAIA men's outdoor track and field championship
- NCAA track and field
  - NCAA women's indoor track and field championships (Division I, Division II, Division III)
  - NCAA women's outdoor track and field championships (Division I, Division II, Division III)
  - NCAA men's indoor track and field championships (Division I, Division II, Division III)
  - NCAA men's outdoor track and field championships (Division I, Division II, Division III)
