= Missouri Baptist Spartans =

Missouri Baptist University Athletic Department

- University: Missouri Baptist University
- Nickname: Spartans
- Association: NAIA
- Conference: HAAC
- Athletic director: Jeff Fore
- Location: St. Louis, Missouri
- Varsity teams: 28
- Football stadium: Spartan Field
- Basketball arena: Carl & Petty Deloris Student Recreation Complex
- Baseball stadium: Spartan Baseball Field
- Softball stadium: Spartan Softball Field
- Colors: Navy and Silver
- Mascot: Spartacus
- Website: mbuspartans.com
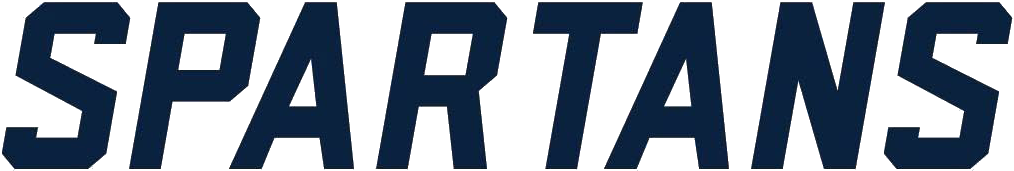

The Missouri Baptist Spartans are the athletic teams that represent Missouri Baptist University, located in St. Louis, Missouri, in intercollegiate sports as a member of the National Association of Intercollegiate Athletics (NAIA), primarily competing in the American Midwest Conference (AMC) for most of its sports since the 1986–87 academic year; while its men's and women's lacrosse teams compete in the Kansas Collegiate Athletic Conference (KCAC), its men's volleyball team competes in the Heart of America Athletic Conference (HAAC), and its football team competes in the Midwest League of the Mid-States Football Association (MSFA).

Dr. Thomas Smith served as Athletic Director for 20 years from 2003 to 2023. The current Athletic Director is Jeff Fore.

== Varsity teams ==
Missouri Baptist competes in 28 intercollegiate varsity sports: Men's sports include baseball, basketball, bowling, cross country, football, golf, lacrosse, soccer, tennis, track & field, volleyball and wrestling; while women's sports include basketball, beach volleyball, bowling, cross country, dance, golf, lacrosse, soccer, softball, stunt, tennis, track & field, volleyball and wrestling; and co-ed sports include cheerleading and eSports.

=== Football ===
Missouri Baptist's football program began competitive play in 2014. They originally played their home games at nearby Christian Brothers College High School, until Spartan Field was completed in the spring of 2020. The Spartans football team played in the MSFA until 2020, but joined the Heart of America Athletic Conference during the 2023 season. The head coach is Marc Lillibridge who took over the program in 2026. As of the conclusion of the 2025 season, the Spartan's hold a 34-90 record all-time, with their best record coming during the 2024 season at 6-4.

=== Men's lacrosse ===
The men's lacrosse program started in 2009, as a member of the MCLA. When the NAIA began sponsoring lacrosse as an emerging sport in 2016, the Spartans participated in both the NAIA, as an independent, and the MCLA, where they were a member of the Great Lakes Lacrosse Conference (GRLC). The Spartans qualified for the inaugural NAIA lacrosse national tournament in 2016 as well. The lacrosse team has been an affiliate member of the KCAC since the 2020 season.

=== Women's lacrosse ===
The women's lacrosse program also got its start in 2009. In 2010, the program was a charter member of the National Women's Lacrosse League (NWLL), a conference for NAIA teams in the Women's Collegiate Lacrosse Associates (WCLA). In 2015, they began NAIA play as an independent, and joined the men's lacrosse team as an affiliate member of the KCAC in 2020.

=== Women's volleyball ===
The women's volleyball team is one of the premier programs in the NAIA. They boast a 544-147 record, 4 conference championships, 13 national tournament appearances, and 2 national championships, since 2005. Headed by Chris Nichols, the Spartans has qualified for 8 consecutive trips to the national tournament, including an appearance in the finals in 2015, which they lost. When the 2020 season was moved to Spring 2021, the Spartans won the national championship in 5 sets. They responded the next season by winning another national championship.

== National championships ==
=== Team ===
Sport	Association	Division	Year	Opponent/Runner-up	Score
Women's indoor track and field (1)	NAIA	Single	2006	Simon Fraser	172–92 (+80)
Women's outdoor track and field (1)	NAIA	Single	2006	Azusa Pacific	126–79 (+497)
Women's volleyball (2)	NAIA	Single	2020	Midland	3–2
Women's volleyball (2)	NAIA	Single	2021	Park (MO)	3–2

== Athletic facilities ==
=== Spartan Field ===
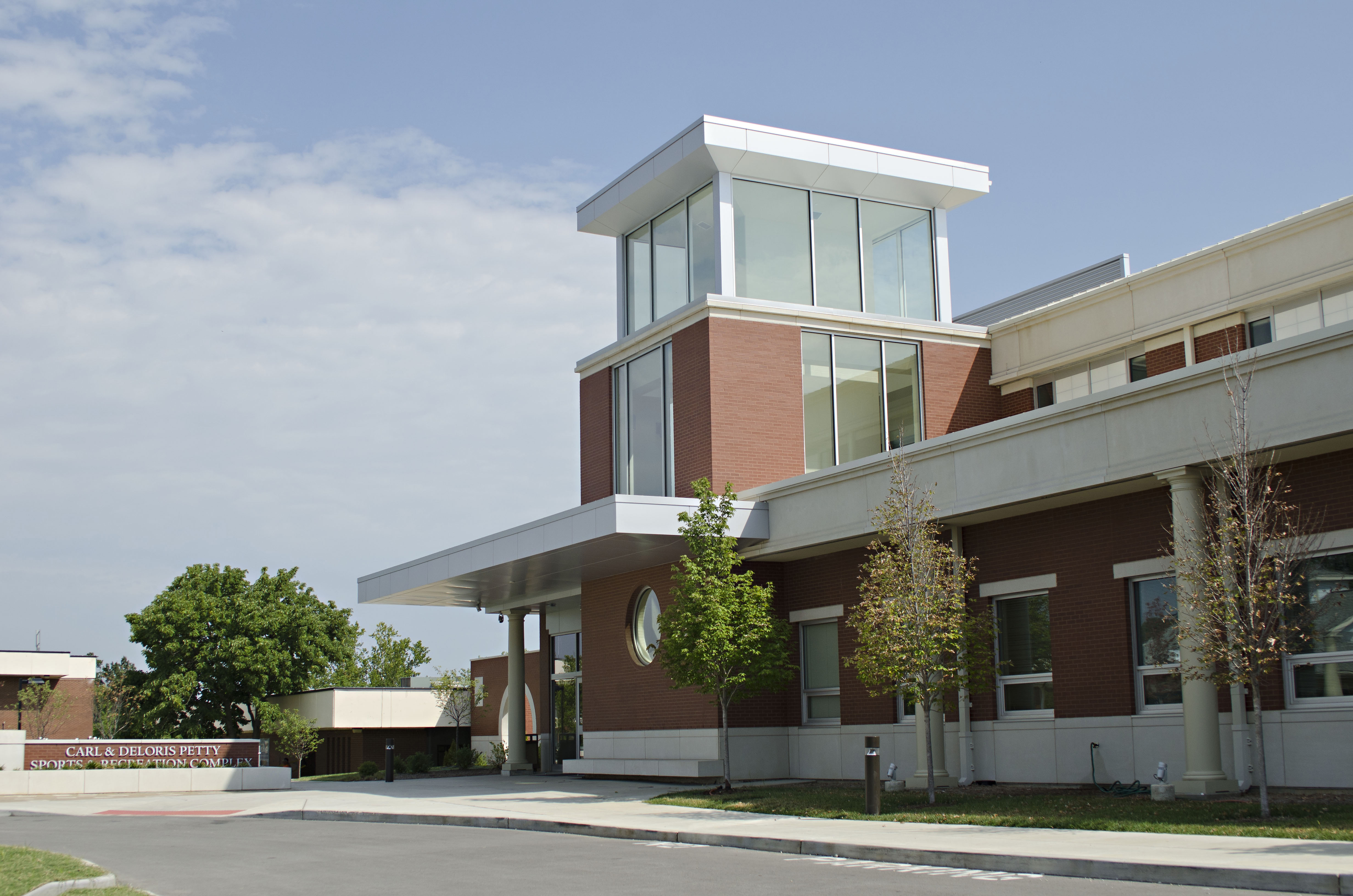
Carl and Delores Petty Sports and Recreation Complex in 2012

Finished in spring 2020, Spartan field is the home to the Spartan's football, men's and women's lacrosse, men's and women's soccer, and men's and women's track & field teams. Spartan Field broke ground in 2014, with the help of Holland Construction Services and was originally used to host men's and women's lacrosse and soccer games, as well as football practices, until the track and stadium were completed. Spartan Field features an 8-lane track, seating for 1000 spectators, and a 11,750 sq. ft. fieldhouse that holds the coaches offices, locker rooms, weight room, concession stand, and public bathrooms.

=== Carl and Deloris Petty Student Recreation Complex (SRC) ===
Opened in 2011, the 1,000 seat gymnasium within the SRC is home to the Spartan men's and women's basketball, men's and women's volleyball, men's and women's wrestling, cheer, dance, and stunt teams. The basketball and volleyball also use the SRC as their practice facility. The SRC has coaches offices, 6 locker rooms, a Matrix fitness center, and Athletic Training Facility, and a running track.

=== Muncy Gymnasium ===
Muncy Gymnasium was the original home for the Spartan's sports teams. When the SRC was completed, Muncy transitioned into a practice facility for the wrestling, cheer, stunt, and dance teams, and is the current home for the esports team. Muncy Gym also contains a half basketball court and the main weight room for student-athletes.
