= Winston-Salem State Rams =

- University: Winston-Salem State University
- Nickname: Rams
- NCAA: Division II
- Conference: CIAA (primary)
- Athletic director: Eric Burns (interim)
- Location: Winston-Salem, North Carolina
- Varsity teams: 11 (4 men's, 6 women's, 1 co-ed)
- Football stadium: Bowman Gray Stadium
- Basketball arena: Clarence E. Gaines Center
- Tennis venue: WSSU Tennis Courts
- Other venues: Whitaker Gymnasium
- Colors: Red and white
- Mascot: Amon the Ram
- Website: wssurams.com

Team NCAA championships
- 1

The Winston-Salem State Rams are the athletic teams that represent Winston-Salem State University, located in Winston-Salem, North Carolina, in NCAA Division II intercollegiate sports. The Rams compete as members of the Central Intercollegiate Athletic Association for all sports.

Winston-Salem State has been a continuous member of the CIAA since 1945, with the exception of a three-year hiatus between 2007 and 2010 when they competed provisionally at the Division I level with the Mid-Eastern Athletic Conference. Financial difficulties, however, prevented the Rams from beginning full membership and they returned to the CIAA and Division II.

== Sponsored sports ==
Men's sports	Women's sports
Basketball	Basketball
Cross Country	Cross Country
Football	Softball
Golf	Tennis
	Track and field
	Volleyball

== Championships ==
=== Team national championships ===
Sport	Association	Division	Year	Runner-up	Score
Men's basketball (1)	NCAA	Division II	1967	Southwest Missouri State	77–74
Men's outdoor track and field (2)	NAIA	Single	1960	East Texas State	58–45 (+13)
Men's outdoor track and field (2)	NAIA	Single	1959	East Texas State	56–55 (+1)

== Individual sports ==
=== Men's basketball ===
In 1967, Winston-Salem State became the first Historically Black College to win an NCAA Basketball Championship. The Rams won the College Division Championship (now Division II) with a 31–1 record. They were led by high-scoring guard Earl Monroe, who averaged 41.5 points per game that season before being selected second overall in the 1967 NBA draft by the Baltimore Bullets (now the Washington Wizards).

=== Baseball ===
In August 2010, Winston-Salem State University reinstated their baseball program after a 37-year hiatus. Despite only being the first year of the program, the baseball team managed to win the CIAA Conference Championship and move on to the Atlantic Regional. The team again won the CIAA Conference Championship in 2012, 2013, and 2014, making that four consecutive conference championships in the first four years of the program. The team also achieved success in the 2013 season by earning the program's first ever national ranking of No. 23 in the country while also hosting the 2013 NCAA Atlantic Regional.

=== Football ===
Winston-Salem State played in the 2012 Division II National Championship football game on December 15, 2012. They lost, 35–7, to Valdosta State University, finishing the season, 14–1, the best of any historically black college/university. The team was led by head coach Connell Maynor and All-American quarterback Kameron Smith.

The current home of the Winston-Salem State football team is Bowman Gray Stadium, which is also home to NASCAR's "longest-running weekly race track", as the stadium is a dual-use complex for both sports.
