= 2023 NAIA outdoor track and field championships =

College track and field competition

- Dates: May 24–26, 2023
- Host city: Marion, Indiana
- Venue: Indiana Wesleyan University
- Events: 46

The 2023 NAIA outdoor track and field championships were the 71st NAIA men's outdoor track and field championship and the 42nd NAIA women's outdoor track and field championship, held on the campus of Indiana Wesleyan University in Marion, Indiana. The event consisted of 23 different men's and women's outdoor track and field events contested from May 24–26, 2023.

== Results ==
=== Men's results ===
==== 100 meters ====
- Final results shown, not prelims

Rank	Name	University	Time	Team score
1st place, gold medalist(s)	Saminu Abdul-Rasheed	Florida Memo	10.23	10
2nd place, silver medalist(s)	Phemelo Matlhabe	Life	10.27	8
3rd place, bronze medalist(s)	Donte Sol	Multnomah	10.27	6
4	Malik Williams	Langston	10.43	5
5	Deveyon Blacknell	Madonna	10.45	4
6	Esau Haynes	Indiana Tech	10.48	3
7	Nastario Williams	Talladega	10.52	2
8	Jaylan Washington	Ottawa	10.54	1
9	James Williamson III	Southeastern	10.57	--

==== 200 meters ====
- Final results shown, not prelims

Rank	Name	University	Time	Team score
1st place, gold medalist(s)	Phemelo Matlhabe	Life	20.51	10
2nd place, silver medalist(s)	Donte Sol	Multnomah	20.72	8
3rd place, bronze medalist(s)	Saminu Abdul-Rasheed	Florida Memo	20.74	6
4	Vincent Giuliano	Olivet Nazare	20.93	5
5	Cameron Alamia	Truett-McCon	20.97	4
6	Darrien Smith	Webber	21.14	3
7	James Williamson III	Southeastern	21.19	2
8	Nastario Williams	Talladega	21.26	1
9	Cody Branch	Dillard	22.54	--

==== 400 meters ====
- Final results shown, not prelims

Rank	Name	University	Time	Team score
1st place, gold medalist(s)	Keishon Franklin	Southeastern	46.57	10
2nd place, silver medalist(s)	Jacob Ulrich	Life	46.60	8
3rd place, bronze medalist(s)	Miles Gray	Indiana Tech	46.84	6
4	Ngoni Chadyiwa	Life	46.90	5
5	London Kirk	Lewis-Clark	47.01	4
6	Zachary Collins	Huntington	47.34	3
7	Cody Branch	Dillard	47.34	2
8	Colin Rowe	Xavier-Louisi	47.87	1
9	Davien Worrels	Southeastern	48.38	--

==== 800 meters ====
- Final results shown, not prelims

Rank	Name	University	Time	Team score
1st place, gold medalist(s)	Senzo Sokhela	Westmont	1:48.78	10
2nd place, silver medalist(s)	Joel Forbes	Cumberland	1:49.32	8
3rd place, bronze medalist(s)	Michael Smikle	St. Thomas	1:50.80	6
4	Milan Todorovic	Oklahoma Cit	1:50.98	5
5	Steven Ott	Indiana Wesl	1:51.12	4
6	Payton Mauldin	Dordt	1:51.22	3
7	Charlie Young	Indiana Wesl	1:51.28	2
8	Cody Farland	Dakota State	1:51.64	1
9	Nate Conkel	Taylor	1:51.65	--

==== 1500 meters ====
- Final results shown, not prelims

Rank	Name	University	Time	Team score
1st place, gold medalist(s)	Jason Bowers	Cumberland	3:47.24	10
2nd place, silver medalist(s)	Senzo Sokhela	Westmont	3:52.94	8
3rd place, bronze medalist(s)	Dean Reynolds	Spring Arbor	3:53.28	6
4	Braden Sweet	Indiana Wesl	3:53.30	5
5	Spencer Hardy	British Colum	3:53.94	4
6	Griffin Armbrustmacher	Lawrence Te	3:54.11	3
7	Dylan Branch	Montreat	3:54.57	2
8	Joshua Wagner	Life	3:55.12	1
9	Liam Kramer	British Colum	3:55.15	--
10	Hunter Nichols	Eastern Oreg	3:55.63	--
11	Trey Engen	Dordt	3:57.28	--

==== 5000 meters ====
- Final results shown, not prelims

Rank	Name	University	Time	Team score
1st place, gold medalist(s)	Emad Bashir-Mohammed	St. Mary (Kan	14:33.76	10
2nd place, silver medalist(s)	Aiden Kammler	Shawnee Stat	14:34.12	8
3rd place, bronze medalist(s)	John Perrier	British Colum	14:34.78	6
4	Jackson Wilson	Rocky Mount	14:39.43	5
5	Joe Anderson	Dordt	14:40.24	4
6	Will Stockley	Milligan	14:42.53	3
7	Daniel Rush	The Master's	14:43.98	2
8	Edwin Kipainoi	Montana Tec	14:53.70	1
9	Davis Boggess	The Master's	14:58.36	--
10	Luke Pohl	Cornerstone	14:58.45	--

==== 10000 meters ====
- Final results shown, not prelims

Rank	Name	University	Time	Team score
1st place, gold medalist(s)	Davis Boggess	The Master's	30:15.16	10
2nd place, silver medalist(s)	Emad Bashir-Mohammed	St. Mary (Kan	30:16.97	8
3rd place, bronze medalist(s)	Aaron Jones	Milligan	30:22.15	6
4	Edwin Kipainoi,	Montana Tec	30:37.91	5
5	Nelson Kemboi	Goshen	30:39.12	4
6	Cody Booth	Shawnee Stat	30:39.58	3
7	Kent Yoder	Huntington	30:55.58	2
8	Zac Wright-Fisher	Life	30:57.40	1
9	Hunter Hoover	Shawnee Stat	31:01.08	--
10	Timothy Wade	St. Francis (Ill	31:08.78	--

==== 110 meter hurdles ====
- Final results shown, not prelims

Rank	Name	University	Time	Team score
1st place, gold medalist(s)	Tajean Houston	Texas Wesle	13.87	10
2nd place, silver medalist(s)	Davonte Vanterpool	Southeastern	13.91	8
3rd place, bronze medalist(s)	Emmanuel Niang	Talladega	13.92	6
4	Darion Carter	Southeastern	14.00	5
5	Glenn Rodgers	Southeastern	14.00	4
6	Chantz Minear	Grand View	14.29	3
7	Erich Rhodeback	Mount Verno	14.55	2
8	Austin Freiberg	Morningside	14.66	1
-	Neil-Matthew Sutherland	Menlo College	DNF	--

==== 400 meter hurdles ====
- Final results shown, not prelims

Rank	Name	University	Time	Team score
1st place, gold medalist(s)	Will Reemtsma	St. Ambrose	50.84	10
2nd place, silver medalist(s)	Dylan Felger	Huntington	51.07	8
3rd place, bronze medalist(s)	Darian Mills	Thomas (Ga.)	51.56	6
4	Aljani Bridgewater	Texas Wesle	51.84	5
5	Collins Mokuah	Indiana Tech	52.72	4
6	Payton Miller	Dordt	52.93	3
7	Khamarly Holmes	Waldorf	52.96	2
8	Darion Carter	Southeastern	55.15	1
9	Ike Hopper	Lewis-Clark	1:00.29	--

==== 3000 meters steeplechase ====
- Final results shown, not prelims

Rank	Name	University	Time	Team score
1st place, gold medalist(s)	Peter Shippy	Dordt	9:04.68	10
2nd place, silver medalist(s)	Kalen Dockweiler	Doane	9:04.98	8
3rd place, bronze medalist(s)	Robin Aguilar-Gonzalez	Marian (Ind.)	9:05.68	6
4	Justin Ash	Eastern Oreg	9:11.24	5
5	Thomas Oliver	Doane	9:13.41	4
6	Ben Hardy	Aquinas	9:14.64	3
7	Thaniel Schroeder	Dordt	9:17.34	2
8	Braden Heath	College of Ida	9:19.20	1
9	Connor Callahan	Aquinas	9:22.92	--
10	Nolan Rudd	St. Ambrose	9:24.52	--
11	Kaden Cooley	St. Mary (Kan	9:33.25	--
12	Justin Morgan	Montana Tec	9:34.79	--
13	Carter Hemeyer	Health Science	9:40.89	--
14	Braden Vernot	Indiana Wesl	9:41.62	--

==== 5000 meters racewalk ====
- Final results shown, not prelims

Rank	Name	University	Time	Team score
1st place, gold medalist(s)	Jordan Crawford	Missouri Bapt	21:20.97	10
2nd place, silver medalist(s)	Carson Johnson	Cumberlands	22:35.88	8
3rd place, bronze medalist(s)	Pablo Sanz-Rillo	Friends	23:19.40	6
4	Gage Carr	Friends	23:54.63	5
5	Nikhil Hirani	British Colum	24:01.97	4
6	Nathan Limas	Grand View	24:06.01	3
7	Cameron Nocton	Indiana East	24:11.11	2
8	Jadon Davis	Friends	25:41.51	1
9	Seth Diser	Grand View	26:07.31	--
10	Wyatt Wilson	Montreat	26:45.17	--
11	Christian Martinez	Roosevelt	28:06.76	--
12	TJ Sanders	Southeastern	28:58.34	--
-	Logan Lucas	Iowa Wesleya	DQ	--
-	Kenny Tucker	Iowa Wesleya	DQ	--
-	Simeon Michelson	Westmont	DQ	--
-	Tyler Wilson	British Colum	DQ	--

==== 4 x 100 meters relay ====
- Final results shown, not prelims

Rank	University	Time	Team score
1st place, gold medalist(s)	Indiana Tech	40.17	10
2nd place, silver medalist(s)	Life	40.30	8
3rd place, bronze medalist(s)	Olivet Nazarene	40.33	6
4	Talladega	40.34	5
5	Cumberlands	40.49	4
6	Multnomah	40.50	3
7	Langston	40.94	2
8	Dillard	41.29	1
9	Keiser	41.52	--

==== 4 x 400 meters relay ====
- Final results shown, not prelims

Rank	University	Time	Team score
1st place, gold medalist(s)	Indiana Tech	3:07.94	10
2nd place, silver medalist(s)	Life	3:08.70	8
3rd place, bronze medalist(s)	Dordt	3:11.26	6
4	William Carey	3:11.77	5
5	Our Lady of the Lake	3:12.55	4
6	Southeastern U.	3:12.57	3
7	Doane	3:13.00	2
8	Marian (Ind.)	3:15.06	1
9	Dillard	3:17.11	--

==== 4 x 800 meters relay ====
- Final results shown, not prelims

Rank	University	Time	Team score
1st place, gold medalist(s)	Spring Arbor	7:31.32	10
2nd place, silver medalist(s)	Indiana Wesleyan	7:31.38	8
3rd place, bronze medalist(s)	Westmont	7:34.75	6
4	Marian (Ind.)	7:35.50	5
5	Dordt	7:38.68	4
6	Lewis-Clark	7:40.03	3
7	Grand View	7:47.01	2
8	St. Mary (Kan.)	7:48.13	1
9	Milligan	8:04.96	--

==== High jump ====
- Final results shown, not prelims

Rank	Name	University	Best jump	Team score
1st place, gold medalist(s)	Shandon Reitzell	Midland	2.11 m (6 ft 11 in)	10
2nd place, silver medalist(s)	Vance Shewey	Tabor	2.11 m (6 ft 11 in)	8
3rd place, bronze medalist(s)	Jamarrion Reed	Texas Wesle	2.08 m (6 ft 9 3/4 in)	6
4	Brady Creech	Hastings	2.08 m (6 ft 9 3/4 in)	5
5	Shane Glasco	Bethel (Ind.)	2.05 m (6 ft 8 1/2 in)	4
6	Hadyn Bieling	Ottawa	2.05 m (6 ft 8 1/2 in)	3
7	Michael Millslagle	Graceland	2.05 m (6 ft 8 1/2 in)	2
8	Victor Dailey	Multnomah	2.00 m (6 ft 6 1/2 in)	0.25
8	Ross McMahon	Midland	2.00 m (6 ft 6 1/2 in)	0.25
8	Tyler Jones	Eastern Oreg	2.00 m (6 ft 6 1/2 in)	0.25
8	Grant Brouwer	Dordt	2.00 m (6 ft 6 1/2 in)	0.25

==== Pole vault ====
- Final results shown, not prelims

Rank	Name	University	Best jump	Team score
1st place, gold medalist(s)	Caleb Pouliot	The Master's	5.10 m (16 ft 8 3/4 in)	10
2nd place, silver medalist(s)	Tom Paris	Keiser	5.00 m (16 ft 4 3/4 in)	8
3rd place, bronze medalist(s)	Zach Zohner	Concordia (N	4.85 m (15 ft 10 3/4 in)	6
4	Treyson Welch	Indiana Wesl	4.85 m (15 ft 10 3/4 in)	5
5	Tristan Petrey	Cumberlands	4.85 m (15 ft 10 3/4 in)	4
6	Damon Knowles	Taylor	4.80 m (15 ft 8 3/4 in)	2.5
6	Josh DeVries	Cornerstone	4.80 m (15 ft 8 3/4 in)	2.5
8	Isaac Brown	Taylor	4.80 m (15 ft 8 3/4 in)	1
9	Victor Rodriguez	Indiana Tech	4.80 m (15 ft 8 3/4 in)	--
10	Joe Painter	St. Francis (In	4.70 m (15 ft 5 in)	--
10	Noah Sears	Olivet Nazare	4.70 m (15 ft 5 in)	--

==== Long jump ====
- Final results shown, not prelims

Rank	Name	University	Best jump	Team score
1st place, gold medalist(s)	Goodness Iredia	Cumberland	7.63 m (25 ft 1/4 in)	10
2nd place, silver medalist(s)	Eryk Kyser	Kansas Wesl	7.49 m (24 ft 6 3/4 in)	8
3rd place, bronze medalist(s)	William Jones	Life	7.44 m (24 ft 4 3/4 in)	6
4	Braden Kalvelage	Northwestern	7.42 m (24 ft 4 in)	5
5	Nastario Williams	Talladega	7.39 m (24 ft 2 3/4 in)	4
6	Coulaj Eans	Xavier-Louisi	7.38 m (24 ft 2 1/2 in)	3
7	Justin Moore	Viterbo	7.36 m (24 ft 1 3/4 in)	2
8	Daimere Stephens-Stewart	Point Park	7.27 m (23 ft 10 in)	1
9	Derrick Jordan II	William Carey	7.23 m (23 ft 8 1/2 in)	--
10	Armani Glass	Marian (Ind.)	7.22 m (23 ft 8 1/4 in)	--

==== Triple jump ====
- Final results shown, not prelims

Rank	Name	University	Best jump	Team score
1st place, gold medalist(s)	Seth Alexander	Xavier-Louisi	15.39 m (50 ft 5 3/4 in)	10
2nd place, silver medalist(s)	Jaylen Coleman	Florida Memo	15.19 m (49 ft 10 in)	8
3rd place, bronze medalist(s)	Blake Harris	Xavier-Louisi	15.14 m (49 ft 8 in)	6
4	Tevon Shuler	Tennessee W	15.13 m (49 ft 7 1/2 in)	5
5	Myles Lincoln	Union (Ky.)	15.12 m (49 ft 7 1/4 in)	4
6	Camron Hamby	Campbellsvill	15.07 m (49 ft 5 1/4 in)	3
7	Jaylen Poole	Cumberland	15.06 m (49 ft 4 3/4 in)	2
8	Enoch Aboussou	Missouri Valle	14.72 m (48 ft 3 1/2 in)	1
9	Corey Smith II	Campbellsvill	14.68 m (48 ft 1 3/4 in)	--
10	Michael Tatnall	Voorhees	14.48 m (47 ft 6 in)	--

==== Shot put ====
- Final results shown, not prelims

Rank	Name	University	Best throw	Team score
1st place, gold medalist(s)	Dylan Kucera	Midland	19.41 m (63 ft 8 in)	10
2nd place, silver medalist(s)	Tanner Nett	Eastern Oreg	17.60 m (57 ft 8 3/4 in)	8
3rd place, bronze medalist(s)	Kyle Manuel	Southeastern	16.97 m (55 ft 8 in)	6
4	Jacob Netral	Marian (Ind.)	16.93 m (55 ft 6 1/2 in)	5
5	Deandre Leith	Columbia Int'l	16.75 m (54 ft 11 1/4 in)	4
6	Darien Semedo	Concordia (N	16.46 m (54 ft 0 in)	3
7	Mykolas Saloninas	St. Ambrose	16.40 m (53 ft 9 1/2 in)	2
8	Christian Rios	Marian (Ind.)	16.33 m (53 ft 6 3/4 in)	1
9	Josh Williamson	The Master's	16.08 m (52 ft 9 in)	--
10	Devin Webster	Thomas More	15.98 m (52 ft 5 in)	--

==== Discus throw ====
- Final results shown, not prelims

Rank	Name	University	Best throw	Team score
1st place, gold medalist(s)	Conner Tordsen	Dakota State	54.14 m (177 ft 7 1/4 in)	10
2nd place, silver medalist(s)	Garrett Kocab	Carroll (Mont.	53.42 m (175 ft 3 in)	8
3rd place, bronze medalist(s)	Jorden Morales	Jamestown	52.15 m (171 ft 1 in)	6
4	Ayobami Aroyko	St. Xavier	51.17 m (167 ft 10 1/2 in)	5
5	Zach Johnson	Tabor	50.60 m (166 ft 0 in)	4
6	Austen Rozelle	Concordia (N	50.47 m (165 ft 7 in)	3
7	Matthew Uliana	British Colum	50.13 m (164 ft 5 1/2 in)	2
8	Deandre Leith	Columbia Int'l	50.03 m (164 ft 1 1/2 in)	1
9	Christian Rios	Marian (Ind.)	49.93 m (163 ft 9 1/2 in)	--
10	Dan Heinig	Indiana Wesl	49.63 m (162 ft 9 3/4 in)	--

==== Javelin throw ====
- Final results shown, not prelims

Rank	Name	University	Best throw	Team score
1st place, gold medalist(s)	David Friedberg	Reinhardt	65.93 m (216 ft 3 1/2 in)	10
2nd place, silver medalist(s)	Andrew Mitchell	Southern Ore	64.93 m (213 ft 1/4 in)	8
3rd place, bronze medalist(s)	Jakob Blatnik	Point Park	62.92 m (206 ft 5 in)	6
4	Cameron Kuziak	British Colum	61.62 m (202 ft 1 3/4 in)	5
5	Daniel Jacobs	Point Park	61.28 m (201 ft 1/2 in)	4
6	Julien David	Keiser	61.05 m (200 ft 3 1/2 in)	3
7	Jacob Ludwick	Ottawa	60.89 m (199 ft 9 in)	2
8	Koby Graham	Evange	60.68 m (199 ft 3/4 in)	1
9	Justice Miller	Grand View	59.19 m (194 ft 2 1/4 in)	--
10	Noah Cunningham	Siena Heights	58.91 m (193 ft 3 1/4 in)	--

==== Hammer throw ====
- Final results shown, not prelims

Rank	Name	University	Best throw	Team score
1st place, gold medalist(s)	Rowan Hamilton	British Colum	71.97 m (236 ft 1 1/4 in)	10
2nd place, silver medalist(s)	Dylan Kucera	Midland	61.56 m (201 ft 11 1/2 in)	8
3rd place, bronze medalist(s)	Alex Hunt	Madonna	61.26 m (200 ft 11 3/4 in)	6
4	Conner Tordsen	Dakota State	59.95 m (196 ft 8 in)	5
5	Christian Rios	Marian (Ind.)	59.47 m (195 ft 1 1/4 in)	4
6	Gerrit Visser	Missouri Valle	58.81 m (192 ft 11 1/4 in)	3
7	Isaiah Tipping	Marian (Ind.)	58.49 m (191 ft 10 3/4 in)	2
8	Luke Partridge	Doane	56.99 m (186 ft 11 1/2 in)	1
9	Andrew Schmitz	Doane	54.94 m (180 ft 2 3/4 in)	--
10	Nickolas Marshall	Missouri Valle	54.75 m (179 ft 7 1/2 in)	--

==== Decathlon ====
Rank	Athlete	Team	Overall points	100 m	LJ	SP	HJ	400 m	110 m H	DT	PV	JT	1500 m
1st place, gold medalist(s)	Nathaniel Paris	British Colum	7232	963; 10.55	845; 7.13 m (23 ft 4 1/2 in)	612; 12.10 m (39 ft 8 1/4 in)	749; 1.94 m (6 ft 4 1/4 in)	886; 48.49	867; 14.86	516; 32.59 m (106 ft 11 in)	673; 4.20 m (13 ft 9 1/4 in)	568; 48.62 m (159 ft 6 in)	553; 5:01.13
2nd place, silver medalist(s)	Brett Glaser	Carroll (Mont.	6879	814; 11.21	707; 6.54 m (21 ft 5 1/4 in)	698; 13.51 m (44 ft 3 3/4 in)	619; 1.79 m (5 ft 10 1/4 in)	818; 49.93	787; 15.53	555; 34.56 m (113 ft 4 1/2 in)	617; 4.00 m (13 ft 1 1/4 in)	627; 52.61 m (172 ft 7 1/4 in)	637; 4:46.95
3rd place, bronze medalist(s)	Cole Wilson	Keiser	6835	834; 11.12	764; 6.79 m (22 ft 3 1/4 in)	673; 13.09 m (42 ft 11 1/4 in)	776; 1.97 m (6 ft 5 1/2 in)	721; 52.08	776; 15.62	616; 37.62 m (123 ft 5 in)	617; 4.00 m (13 ft 1 1/4 in)	502; 44.13 m (144 ft 9 1/4 in)	556; 5:00.71
4	Justin Moeller	William Penn	6762	778; 11.38	809; 6.98 m (22 ft 10 3/4 in)	533; 10.78 m (35 ft 4 1/4 in)	749; 1.94 m (6 ft 4 1/4 in)	769; 51.01	812; 15.31	451; 29.31 m (96 ft 1 3/4 in)	731; 4.40 m (14 ft 5 in)	569; 48.69 m (159 ft 8 3/4 in)	561; 4:59.84
5	Seth Wiebelhaus	Mount Marty	6678	717; 11.67	695; 6.49 m (21 ft 3 1/2 in)	636; 12.49 m (40 ft 11 1/2 in)	670; 1.85 m (6 ft 3/4 in)	740; 51.65	864; 14.88	476; 30.59 m (100 ft 4 1/4 in)	562; 3.80 m (12 ft 5 1/2 in)	605; 51.14 m (167 ft 9 1/4 in)	713; 4:34.94
6	Nigel Steenwinkel	Keiser	6553	890; 10.87	677; 6.41 m (21 ft 1/4 in)	592; 11.76 m (38 ft 6 3/4 in)	569; 1.73 m (5 ft 8 in)	801; 50.30	824; 15.21	571; 35.38 m (116 ft 3/4 in)	562; 3.80 m (12 ft 5 1/2 in)	486; 43.05 m (141 ft 2 3/4 in)	581; 4:56.33
7	Mason Schleis	Mount Marty	6526	867; 10.97	709; 6.55 m (21 ft 5 3/4 in)	496; 10.17 m (33 ft 4 1/4 in)	749; 1.94 m (6 ft 4 1/4 in)	800; 50.31	735; 15.98	385; 25.92 m (85 ft 1/4 in)	673; 4.20 m (13 ft 9 1/4 in)	499; 43.93 m (144 ft 1 1/2 in)	613; 4:50.95
8	Christian Bothwell	Lewis-Clark	6500	789; 11.33	652; 6.30 m (20 ft 8 in)	614; 12.13 m (39 ft 9 1/2 in)	619; 1.79 m (5 ft 10 1/4 in)	779; 50.79	726; 16.07	502; 31.90 m (104 ft 7 3/4 in)	617; 4.00 m (13 ft 1 1/4 in)	573; 48.97 m (160 ft 7 3/4 in)	629; 4:48.33
9	Elisha Fleming	Bethel (Ind.)	6490	763; 11.45	668; 6.37 m (20 ft 10 3/4 in)	576; 11.50 m (37 ft 8 3/4 in)	723; 1.91 m (6 ft 3 in)	751; 51.41	737; 15.96	565; 35.05 m (114 ft 11 3/4 in)	509; 3.60 m (11 ft 9 1/2 in)	653; 54.33 m (178 ft 2 3/4 in)	545; 5:02.54
10	Israel Miles	Eastern Oreg	6459	821; 11.18	727; 6.63 m (21 ft 9 in)	551; 11.08 m (36 ft 4 in)	569; 1.73 m (5 ft 8 in)	728; 51.92	852; 14.98	451; 29.30 m (96 ft 1 1/2 in)	645; 4.10 m (13 ft 5 1/4 in)	534; 46.27 m (151 ft 9 1/2 in)	581; 4:56.37

=== Men's team scores ===
- Top 10 and ties shown

Rank	University	Team score
1st place, gold medalist(s)	Life	55 points
2nd place, silver medalist(s)	British Columbia	41 points
3rd place, bronze medalist(s)	Southeastern U.	39 points
4	Indiana Tech	33 points
5	Dordt	32.25 points
6	Cumberland (Tenn.)	30 points
7	Midland	28.25 points
8	Marian (Ind.)	24 points
8	Westmont	24 points
8	Indiana Wesleyan	24 points
8	Florida Memorial	24 points

=== Women's results ===
==== 100 meters ====
- Final results shown, not prelims

Rank	Name	University	Time	Team score
1st place, gold medalist(s)	Talayla Davis	Life	11.39	10
2nd place, silver medalist(s)	Alyssa Busker	Trinity Christi	11.66	8
3rd place, bronze medalist(s)	Machaeda Linton	William Carey	11.71	6
4	Hanna Sobkowich	British Colum	11.77	5
5	Denai Wilson	Florida Memo	11.78	4
6	Salieci Myles	William Carey	11.80	3
7	Jaelynn Williams	Texas Wesle	11.85	2
8	Jamaya Warthen	Indiana Tech	11.90	1
9	Alexia Boyd	Campbellsvill	11.96	--

==== 200 meters ====
- Final results shown, not prelims

Rank	Name	University	Time	Team score
1st place, gold medalist(s)	Praise Idamadudu	Cumberland	23.60	10
2nd place, silver medalist(s)	Denai Wilson	Florida Memo	23.68	8
3rd place, bronze medalist(s)	Talayla Davis	Life	23.79	6
4	Alyssa Busker	Trinity Christi	23.88	5
5	Kevell Byrd	Dillard	24.05	4
6	Jamaya Warthen	Indiana Tech	24.18	3
7	Hanna Sobkowic	British Colum	24.23	2
8	Kynnedy Turner	Xavier-Louisi	24.28	1
8	Sabrina Richman	Life	25.49	--

==== 400 meters ====
- Final results shown, not prelims

Rank	Name	University	Time	Team score
1st place, gold medalist(s)	Praise Idamadudu	Cumberland	53.28	10
2nd place, silver medalist(s)	Brianna Florvilus	Life	54.37	8
3rd place, bronze medalist(s)	Soyinne Grenyion	Indiana Tech	55.08	6
4	Charity Jones	Madonna	55.43	5
5	Gabbi Butler	St. Ambrose	55.46	4
6	Jo'Deci Irby	Indiana Tech	55.70	3
7	Kiara Carter	Olivet Nazare	56.37	2
8	Rachel Battershell	Concordia (N	57.41	1
9	Calli Davis	Mount Marty	57.78	--
-	Sabrina Richman		DQ	--

==== 800 meters ====
- Final results shown, not prelims

Rank	Name	University	Time	Team score
1st place, gold medalist(s)	Addy Wiley	Huntington	2:04.29	10
2nd place, silver medalist(s)	Lisa Voyles	Indiana Tech	2:08.25	8
3rd place, bronze medalist(s)	Rachel Mortimer	British Colum	2:08.42	6
4	Kylie Sauder	Grace	2:09.53	5
5	Holly MacGillivray	British Colum	2:09.95	4
6	Maggie Whitney	Aquinas	2:11.12	3
7	Michelle Herbes	Eastern Oreg	2:11.56	2
8	Ellen Palmgren	The Master's	2:11.71	1
9	Caroline Cobo	Benedictine	2:13.17	--

==== 1500 meters ====
- Final results shown, not prelims

Rank	Name	University	Time	Team score
1st place, gold medalist(s)	Addy Wiley	Huntington	4:14.56	10
2nd place, silver medalist(s)	Holly MacGillivray	British Colum	4:22.59	8
3rd place, bronze medalist(s)	Sydney Little Light	Rocky Mount	4:26.78	6
4	Abbey Shirts	College of Ida	4:28.48	5
5	Caroline Cobo	Benedictine	4:33.69	4
6	Rylee Haecker	Concordia (N	4:33.84	3
7	Ana Pineda	St. Francis (Ill	4:35.67	2
8	Ellen-Mary Kearney	Milligan	4:35.70	1
9	Heather Plastow	Grace	4:35.97	--
10	Amelia Pfohl	British Colum	4:37.25	--
11	Emma Muterspaw	Taylor	4:42.70	--
12	Emily Tedder	Huntington	4:43.72	--

==== 5000 meters ====
- Final results shown, not prelims

Rank	Name	University	Time	Team score
1st place, gold medalist(s)	Katie Newlove	British Colum	16:57.35	10
2nd place, silver medalist(s)	Julia Rohm	Southeastern	17:08.15	8
3rd place, bronze medalist(s)	Ellyse Tingelstad	College of Ida	17:10.24	6
4	Reagan Hiebert	St. Mary (Kan	17:20.93	5
5	Marley Beckett	British Colum	17:22.71	4
6	Addi Dewey	Indiana Wesl	17:31.62	3
7	Mercy Chebet	Goshen	17:33.40	2
8	Sage Martin	College of Ida	17:33.95	1
9	Emma Timmermans	Hope Int'l	17:35.89	--
10	Hannah Fredericks	The Master's	17:37.75	--

==== 10000 meters ====
- Final results shown, not prelims

Rank	Name	University	Time	Team score
1st place, gold medalist(s)	Julia Rohm	Southeastern	35:53.10	10
2nd place, silver medalist(s)	Ellyse Tingelstad	College of Ida	35:59.90	8
3rd place, bronze medalist(s)	Hannah Fredericks	The Master's	36:18.33	6
4	Marley Beckett	British Colum	36:36.64	5
5	Katherine Bakken	St. Francis (Ill	36:39.51	4
6	Mollie Gamble	Taylor	36:51.23	3
7	Talia Sullivan	SCAD Savan	37:00.59	2
8	Hannah Adler	Aquinas	37:00.74	1
9	Hailey Nielson	Montana Tec	37:16.89	--
10	Alejandra Lopez	Southern Ore	37:17.16	--

==== 100 meter hurdles ====
- Final results shown, not prelims

Rank	Name	University	Time	Team score
1st place, gold medalist(s)	Salieci Myles	William Carey	13.28	10
2nd place, silver medalist(s)	Gizel Clayton	Central Meth	13.38	8
3rd place, bronze medalist(s)	Hannah Antkoviak	Olivet Nazare	13.61	6
4	Emerald Carter	Xavier-Louisi	13.78	5
5	Doris Mensah	Cumberland	13.81	4
6	Erin Oleksak	Marian (Ind.)	13.84	3
7	Tashina Beyioku-Alase	Dillard	13.90	2
8	Joy Abu	William Carey	14.38	1
-	Tre'Breh Scott	Central Meth	DNF	--

==== 400 meter hurdles ====
- Final results shown, not prelims

Rank	Name	University	Time	Team score
1st place, gold medalist(s)	Hannah Antkoviak	Olivet Nazare	56.71	10
2nd place, silver medalist(s)	Joy Abu	William Carey	59.12	8
3rd place, bronze medalist(s)	Jordyn Burke	Vanguard	1:00.81	6
4	Wrenzi Wrzesinski	Dickinson St.	1:01.22	5
5	Ashley Britt	Lewis-Clark	1:02.18	4
6	JayOnna Perry	Ottawa	1:02.30	3
7	Alison Ambuul	Benedictine	1:02.69	2
8	Namiah Simpson	Southeastern	1:02.70	1
9	Tajanique Bell	Baker	1:02.84	--

==== 3000 meters steeplechase ====
- Final results shown, not prelims

Rank	Name	University	Time	Team score
1st place, gold medalist(s)	Sage Martin	College of Ida	10:17.90	10
2nd place, silver medalist(s)	Evie Miller	St. Francis (In	10:32.43	8
3rd place, bronze medalist(s)	Jamie Hennessey	British Colum	10:34.07	6
4	Alyssa Armendariz	St. Mary (Kan	10:37.32	5
5	Ahna Vanderwall	Taylor	10:46.56	4
6	Riley Hiebert	St. Mary (Kan	10:52.49	3
7	Larissa Maier	College of Ida	10:54.81	2
8	Ellie Dimond	William Wood	10:56.61	1
9	Morgan Lawson	Grand View	11:10.30	--
10	Mia Reed	Missouri Bapt	11:12.00	--
11	Jenna Mallory	Montreat	11:12.07	--
12	Elyse Kuperus	Dordt	11:13.85	--
13	Meredith Johnson	Lindsey Wilso	11:16.59	--
14	Caroline Giles	Friends	11:28.03	--

==== 5000 meters racewalk ====
- Final results shown, not prelims

Rank	Name	University	Time	Team score
1st place, gold medalist(s)	Olivia Lundman	British Colum	23:24.98	10
2nd place, silver medalist(s)	Izabelle Trefts	Columbia (S.	24:40.04	8
3rd place, bronze medalist(s)	Joean Lu	British Colum	24:49.06	6
4	Cassidy Cardle	British Colum	26:01.95	5
5	Victoria Heiser-Whatley	Columbia (S.	27:17.14	4
6	Ainhoa Colino	Columbia (S.	27:40.82	3
7	Jessica Heiser-Whatley	Columbia (S.	27:40.97	2
8	Paige Thompson	Grand View	28:08.71	1
9	Baileigh Morris	Central Meth	28:15.56	--
10	Lauren Dawson	Concordia (N	28:34.97	--
11	Tara Todd	Cumberlands	29:27.20	--
12	Allison Morris	Iowa Wesleya	30:02.77	--
13	Jenna Grogan	Cumberlands	30:25.35	--
14	Abby Hill	Mount Mercy	30:52.20	--
15	Faith Younce	Iowa Wesleya	32:05.95	--
-	Korissa VanOver	Indiana Tech	DQ	--

==== 4 x 100 meters relay ====
- Final results shown, not prelims

Rank	University	Time	Team score
1st place, gold medalist(s)	William Carey	45.07	10
2nd place, silver medalist(s)	Life	45.22	8
3rd place, bronze medalist(s)	Cumberland (Tenn.)	45.82	6
4	Southeastern U.	46.16	5
5	Vanguard	46.17	4
6	Dillard	46.24	3
7	Madonna	46.30	2
8	Mobile	46.49	1
9	Indiana Tech	46.50	--

==== 4 x 400 meters relay ====
- Final results shown, not prelims

Rank	University	Time	Team score
1st place, gold medalist(s)	Indiana Tech	3:43.01	10
2nd place, silver medalist(s)	William Carey	3:44.07	8
3rd place, bronze medalist(s)	Olivet Nazarene	3:45.63	6
4	Southeastern U.	3:46.27	5
5	Vanguard	3:48.73	4
6	Madonna	3:49.21	3
7	Dordt	3:49.51	2
8	Concordia (Neb.)	3:50.06	1
9	Xavier-Louisiana	3:53.45	--

==== 4 x 800 meters relay ====
- Final results shown, not prelims

Rank	University	Time	Team score
1st place, gold medalist(s)	British Columbia	8:56.68	10
2nd place, silver medalist(s)	Grace	8:59.51	8
3rd place, bronze medalist(s)	Dordt	9:01.80	6
4	Indiana Tech	9:09.89	5
5	Huntington	9:10.21	4
6	St. Mary (Kan.)	9:13.52	3
7	The Master's	9:16.77	2
8	Eastern Oregon	9:18.06	1
9	Goshen	9:28.45	--

==== High jump ====
- Final results shown, not prelims

Rank	Name	University	Best jump	Team score
1st place, gold medalist(s)	Jennah Carpenter	Lewis-Clark	1.74 m (5 ft 8 1/2 in)	10
2nd place, silver medalist(s)	Erin Oleksak	Marian (Ind.)	1.71 m (5 ft 7 1/4 in)	8
3rd place, bronze medalist(s)	Gina Butz	Marian (Ind.)	1.71 m (5 ft 7 1/4 in)	6
4	Sidney Gilliland	Graceland	1.68 m (5 ft 6 in)	5
5	Renee Finke	Central Meth	1.68 m (5 ft 6 in)	4
6	Abi Stevens	Southern Ore	1.68 m (5 ft 6 in)	3
7	Emma Valentine	Siena Heights	1.68 m (5 ft 6 in)	1.5
7	Jacie Vander Waal	Northwestern	1.68 m (5 ft 6 in)	1.5
9	Hannah Newton	Concordia (N	1.65 m (5 ft 4 3/4 in)	--
9	Abi Hume	Indiana Wesl	1.65 m (5 ft 4 3/4 in)	--

==== Pole vault ====
- Final results shown, not prelims

Rank	Name	University	Best jump	Team score
1st place, gold medalist(s)	Sonya Urbanowicz	British Colum	3.95 m (12 ft 11 1/2 in)	10
2nd place, silver medalist(s)	Josie Puelz	Concordia (N	3.90 m (12 ft 9 1/2 in)	8
3rd place, bronze medalist(s)	Erica Albrecht	Siena Heights	3.80 m (12 ft 5 1/2 in)	6
4	Margherita Conrad	Siena Heights	3.75 m (12 ft 3 1/2 in)	5
5	Nevaeh Brown	Midway	3.70 m (12 ft 1 1/2 in)	4
6	Abby Rumohr	Westmont	3.70 m (12 ft 1 1/2 in)	3
7	Ashley VerPlank	Cornerstone	3.65 m (11 ft 11 1/2 in)	2
8	Chasity Mies	Siena Heights	3.65 m (11 ft 11 1/2 in)	1
9	Tatum Townsend	Cornerstone	3.55 m (11 ft 7 3/4 in)	--
10	Emma Johnson	Viterbo	3.55 m (11 ft 7 3/4 in)	--

==== Long jump ====
- Final results shown, not prelims

Rank	Name	University	Best jump	Team score
1st place, gold medalist(s)	Machaeda Linton	William Carey	5.90 m (19 ft 4 1/4 in)	10
2nd place, silver medalist(s)	Erin Oleksak	Marian (Ind.)	5.90 m (19 ft 4 1/4 in)	8
3rd place, bronze medalist(s)	Myesha Hall	Truett-McCon	5.84 m (19 ft 1 3/4 in)	6
4	Makala Pfefferkorn	Indiana Koko	5.73 m (18 ft 9 1/2 in)	5
5	Alexia Boyd	Campbellsvill	5.70 m (18 ft 8 1/4 in)	4
6	Aniecia Goss	Tennessee W	5.68 m (18 ft 7 1/2 in)	3
7	Princess Browne	Multnomah	5.66 m (18 ft 6 3/4 in)	2
8	Emma Rastad	British Colum	5.62 m (18 ft 5 1/4 in)	1
9	Mariam Davis	Southeastern	5.57 m (18 ft 3 1/4 in)	--
10	Destiny Copeland	Huntington	5.51 m (18 ft 3/4 in)	--

==== Triple jump ====
- Final results shown, not prelims

Rank	Name	University	Best jump	Team score
1st place, gold medalist(s)	Machaeda Linton	William Carey	12.52 m (41 ft 3/4 in)	10
2nd place, silver medalist(s)	Jai-Lyn Norwood	Marian (Ind.)	12.51 m (41 ft 1/2 in)	8
3rd place, bronze medalist(s)	Destiny Copeland	Huntington	12.32 m (40 ft 5 in)	6
4	Nevagant Jones	William Carey	12.28 m (40 ft 3 1/4 in)	5
5	Allison Macdonald	British Colum	12.19 m (39 ft 11 3/4 in)	4
6	Myesha Hall	Truett-McCon	12.17 m (39 ft 11 in)	3
7	Jessica Gakeri	Montreat	12.12 m (39 ft 9 in)	2
8	Alexia Schofield	Campbellsvill	12.11 m (39 ft 8 3/4 in)	1
9	Ahmia Dorsey	Langston	11.93 m (39 ft 1 1/2 in)	--
10	Miyah Ford	Southeastern	11.93 m (39 ft 1 1/2 in)	--

==== Shot put ====
- Final results shown, not prelims

Rank	Name	University	Best throw	Team score
1st place, gold medalist(s)	Maggie Ledbetter	Eastern Oreg	15.47 m (50 ft 9 in)	10
2nd place, silver medalist(s)	Levonis Davis	Life	14.76 m (48 ft 5 in)	8
3rd place, bronze medalist(s)	Kori Nagel	Dickinson St.	14.73 m (48 ft 3 3/4 in)	6
4	Princess Kara	Indiana Wesl	14.28 m (46 ft 10 in)	5
5	Claire Caspersen	St. Mary (Neb	14.07 m (46 ft 1 3/4 in)	4
6	Daveina Watson	Cumberland	14.05 m (46 ft 1 in)	3
7	Baylee Beard	Central Meth	14.03 m (46 ft 1/4 in)	2
8	Arriana Benjamin	Marian (Ind.)	13.98 m (45 ft 10 1/4 in)	1
9	Annah Miller	St. Ambrose	13.91 m (45 ft 7 1/2 in)	--
10	Fedra Florentin	Mobile	13.76 m (45 ft 1 1/2 in)	--

==== Discus throw ====
- Final results shown, not prelims

Rank	Name	University	Best throw	Team score
1st place, gold medalist(s)	Princess Kara	Indiana Wesl	52.77 m (173 ft 1 1/2 in)	10
2nd place, silver medalist(s)	Madison Green	Grand View	47.21 m (154 ft 10 1/2 in)	8
3rd place, bronze medalist(s)	Madison Sutton	Benedictine	45.83 m (150 ft 4 1/4 in)	6
4	Kayla Mikottis	Olivet Nazare	45.73 m (150 ft 1/4 in)	5
5	Merideth Devries	Indiana Wesl	45.19 m (148 ft 3 in)	4
6	Jessa Eden	Hastings	45.05 m (147 ft 9 1/2 in)	3
7	Arriana Benjamin	Marian (Ind.)	45.02 m (147 ft 8 1/4 in)	2
8	DaNya Horne	Xavier-Louisi	44.35 m (145 ft 6 in)	1
9	Kori Nagel	Dickinson St.	44.24 m (145 ft 1 1/2 in)	--
10	Calla Haldorson	Providence	43.26 m (141 ft 11 in)	--

==== Javelin throw ====
- Final results shown, not prelims

Rank	Name	University	Best throw	Team score
1st place, gold medalist(s)	Alex Conley	Oregon Tech	47.27 m (155 ft 1 in)	10
2nd place, silver medalist(s)	Mckenzie Clark	Providence	46.85 m (153 ft 8 1/4 in)	8
3rd place, bronze medalist(s)	Micaiah Scott	The Master's	46.32 m (151 ft 11 1/2 in)	6
4	Kendra Odegard	Valley City St	45.08 m (147 ft 10 3/4 in)	5
5	Lizzy Grandle	Eastern Oreg	44.10 m (144 ft 8 in)	4
6	Laurel Barber	Ottawa	43.47 m (142 ft 7 1/4 in)	3
7	Jenna Jordan	Montana Tec	42.75 m (140 ft 3 in)	2
8	Katilyn Babb	Truett-McCon	42.58 m (139 ft 8 1/4 in)	1
9	Allie Best	Eastern Oreg	42.11 m (138 ft 1 3/4 in)	--
10	Ellie Emerson	William Wood	41.24 m (135 ft 3 1/2 in)	--

==== Hammer throw ====
- Final results shown, not prelims

Rank	Name	University	Best throw	Team score
1st place, gold medalist(s)	Jennifer Batu	Life	58.66 m (192 ft 5 1/4 in)	10
2nd place, silver medalist(s)	Kiara Anderson	Hastings	56.35 m (184 ft 10 1/2 in)	8
3rd place, bronze medalist(s)	Macy Fuller	Doane	55.78 m (183 ft 0 in)	6
4	Madison Green	Grand View	55.24 m (181 ft 2 3/4 in)	5
5	Kenna Woodward	Eastern Oreg	54.83 m (179 ft 10 1/2 in)	4
6	Baylee Beard	Central Meth	54.46 m (178 ft 8 in)	3
7	Madison Sutton	Benedictine	53.81 m (176 ft 6 1/2 in)	2
8	Kori Nagel	Dickinson St.	53.62 m (175 ft 11 in)	1
9	Maggie Ledbetter	Eastern Oreg	52.52 m (172 ft 3 1/2 in)	--
10	Arriana Benjamin	Marian (Ind.)	52.40 m (171 ft 10 3/4 in)	--

==== Heptathlon ====
Rank	Athlete	Team	Overall points	100 m H	HJ	SP	200 m	LJ	JT	800 m
1st place, gold medalist(s)	Kaitlyn McColly	Dickinson St.	4922	901; 14.56	712; 1.58 m (5 ft 2 in)	545; 10.24 m (33 ft 7 in)	769; 26.33	663; 5.37 m (17 ft 7 1/4 in)	579; 35.41 m (116 ft 2 in)	753; 2:25.28
2nd place, silver medalist(s)	Rebecca Dutchak	British Colum	4830	899; 14.57	577; 1.46 m (4 ft 9 1/4 in)	623; 11.42 m (37 ft 5 1/2 in)	800; 25.97	645; 5.31 m (17 ft 5 in)	640; 38.57 m (126 ft 6 1/2 in)	646; 2:33.81
3rd place, bronze medalist(s)	Abby Clark	Montana Tec	4826	722; 15.94	783; 1.64 m (5 ft 4 1/2 in)	592; 10.96 m (35 ft 11 1/4 in)	802; 25.94	657; 5.35 m (17 ft 6 1/2 in)	529; 32.74 m (107 ft 4 3/4 in)	741; 2:26.24
4	Abi Stevens	Southern Ore	4705	770; 15.55	783; 1.64 m (5 ft 4 1/2 in)	471; 9.10 m (29 ft 10 1/4 in)	752; 26.52	617; 5.21 m (17 ft 1 in)	543; 33.48 m (109 ft 10 in)	769; 2:24.05
5	Destiny Copeland	Huntington	4652	783; 15.45	577; 1.46 m (4 ft 9 1/4 in)	539; 10.15 m (33 ft 3 1/2 in)	944; 24.39	723; 5.58 m (18 ft 3 1/2 in)	301; 20.65 m (67 ft 8 3/4 in)	785; 2:22.88
6	Mariam Davis	Southeastern	4645	819; 15.17	712; 1.58 m (5 ft 2 in)	511; 9.72 m (31 ft 10 1/2 in)	795; 26.03	683; 5.44 m (17 ft 10 in)	481; 30.24 m (99 ft 2 1/2 in)	644; 2:33.94
7	Anna Cabrera	Mobile	4644	888; 14.65	712; 1.58 m (5 ft 2 in)	588; 10.89 m (35 ft 8 1/2 in)	686; 27.31	576; 5.06 m (16 ft 7 in)	588; 35.85 m (117 ft 7 1/4 in)	606; 2:37.19
8	Lizzy Grandle	Eastern Oreg	4477	695; 16.16	747; 1.61 m (5 ft 3 1/4 in)	645; 11.75 m (38 ft 6 1/2 in)	672; 27.48	527; 4.88 m (16 ft 0 in)	709; 42.19 m (138 ft 5 in)	482; 2:48.27
9	Jenna Hodges	Southern Ore	4391	617; 16.82	577; 1.46 m (4 ft 9 1/4 in)	526; 9.94 m (32 ft 7 1/4 in)	745; 26.61	603; 5.16 m (16 ft 11 in)	641; 38.64 m (126 ft 9 1/4 in)	682; 2:30.87
10	Josi Noble	Concordia (N	4370	665; 16.41	481; 1.37 m (4 ft 5 3/4 in)	570; 10.62 m (34 ft 10 in)	812; 25.83	538; 4.92 m (16 ft 1 1/2 in)	582; 35.55 m (116 ft 7 1/2 in)	722; 2:27.71

=== Women's team scores ===
- Top 10 and ties shown

Rank	University	Team score
1st place, gold medalist(s)	British Columbia	104 points
2nd place, silver medalist(s)	William Carey	71 points
3rd place, bronze medalist(s)	Life	50 points
4	Marian (Ind.)	36 points
4	Indiana Tech	36 points
6	Huntington	34 points
7	Cumberland (Tenn.)	33 points
8	Southeastern U.	32 points
8	College of Idaho	32 points
10	Olivet Nazarene	29 points

== See also ==
- National Association of Intercollegiate Athletics (NAIA)
- 2023 NAIA indoor track and field championships
- 2023 NCAA Division I Outdoor Track and Field Championships
