= Prairie View A&M Panthers and Lady Panthers =

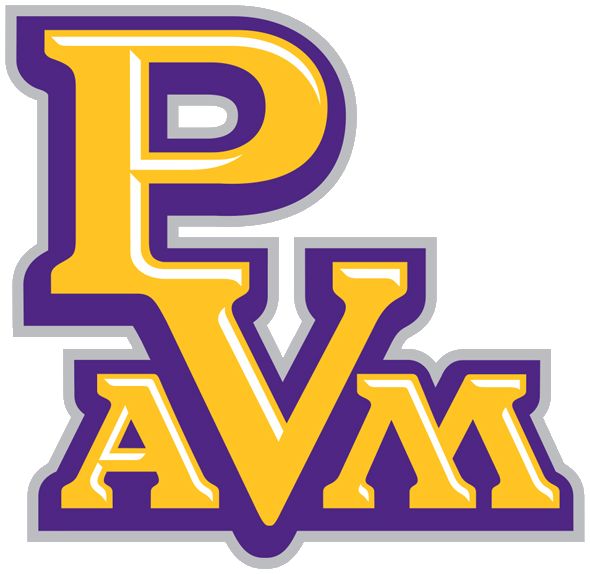
- University: Prairie View A&M University
- NCAA: Division I (FCS)
- Conference: Southwestern Athletic Conference
- Athletic director: Anton Goff
- Location: Prairie View, Texas
- Varsity teams: 16 (7 men's and 9 women's)
- Football stadium: Panther Stadium at Blackshear Field
- Basketball arena: William Nicks Building
- Baseball stadium: John W. Tankersley Field
- Softball stadium: Lady Panthers Softball Stadium
- Volleyball arena: William Nicks Building
- Nickname: Panthers
- Colors: Purple and gold
- Website: pvpanthers.com

The Prairie View A&M Panthers and Lady Panthers represent Prairie View A&M University in Prairie View, Texas in intercollegiate athletics. They field eighteen teams including men and women's basketball, cross country, golf, and indoor and outdoor track and field; women's-only bowling, soccer, softball, tennis, and volleyball; and men's-only baseball and football. The Panthers compete in the NCAA Division I and are members of the Southwestern Athletic Conference.

== Sports sponsored ==
| Men's sports | Women's sports |
|---|---|
| Baseball | Basketball |
| Basketball | Bowling |
| Football | Cross Country |
| Golf | Golf |
| Tennis | Soccer |
| Track and field^{†} | Softball |
| | Tennis |
| | Track and field^{†} |
| | Volleyball |
† – Track and field includes both indoor and outdoor

== National championships ==
=== Team ===
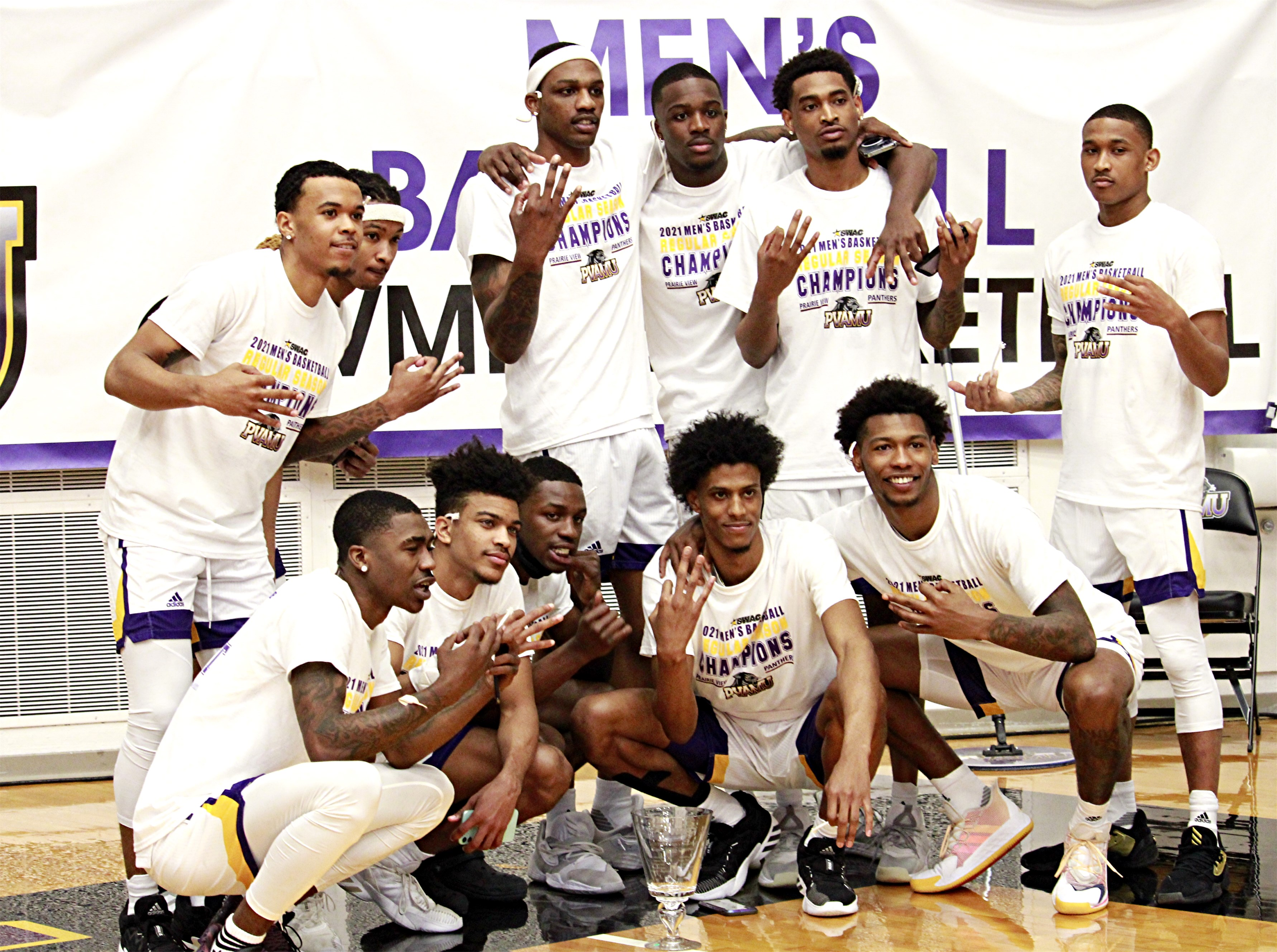
The Panthers basketball team in March 2021

| Sport | Association | Division | Year | Opponent/Runner-up | Score |
|---|---|---|---|---|---|
| Men's indoor track and field (1) | NAIA | Single | 1968 | Texas Southern | 70–67.5 |
| Women's indoor track and field (3) | NAIA | Single | 1984 | Texas Southern | 92–62 |
| Women's indoor track and field (3) | NAIA | Single | 1987 | Wayland Baptist | 106–96 |
| Women's indoor track and field (3) | NAIA | Single | 1991 | Central State (OH) | 72–61 |
| Men's outdoor track and field (2) | NAIA | Single | 1968 | Arkansas AM&N | 47–45 (+2) |
| Men's outdoor track and field (2) | NAIA | Single | 1969 | Southern Baton Rouge | 69½–68 (+1½) |
| Women's outdoor track and field (9) | NAIA | Single | 1982 | Adams State | 117–73 (+44) |
| Women's outdoor track and field (9) | NAIA | Single | 1983 | Hampton | 119–90 (+29) |
| Women's outdoor track and field (9) | NAIA | Single | 1984 | Adams State | 100–83 (+17) |
| Women's outdoor track and field (9) | NAIA | Single | 1985 | Adams State | 109–63.5 (+45.5) |
| Women's outdoor track and field (9) | NAIA | Single | 1986 | Wayland Baptist | 117–110 (+7) |
| Women's outdoor track and field (9) | NAIA | Single | 1987 | Wayland Baptist | 144–86 (+58) |
| Women's outdoor track and field (9) | NAIA | Single | 1988 | Wayland Baptist | 144–86 (+58) |
| Women's outdoor track and field (9) | NAIA | Single | 1989 | Arkansas–Pine Bluff; Concordia Nebraska | 109–50 (+59) |
| Women's outdoor track and field (9) | NAIA | Single | 1990 | Vacated | — |

- Asterisk indicates a shared national championship
