= Azusa Pacific Cougars =

University Athletic Program

- University: Azusa Pacific University
- Nickname: Cougars
- NCAA: Division III
- Conference: Southern California Intercollegiate Athletic Conference (primary); PCSC (swimming and diving); GCC (women's water polo)
- Athletic director: Gary Pine
- Location: Azusa, California
- Varsity teams: 16 (7 men's, 10 women's)
- Football stadium: Cougar Athletic Stadium
- Basketball arena: Felix Event Center
- Baseball stadium: Cougar Baseball Complex
- Softball stadium: Cougar Softball Complex
- Soccer stadium: Cougar Soccer Complex
- Tennis venue: Munson and Bavougian Tennis Complex
- Outdoor track and field venue: Cougar Athletic Stadium
- Colors: Brick and black
- Mascot: Freddy Cougar
- Website: athletics.apu.edu

Team NCAA championships
- 2

The Azusa Pacific Cougars are the athletic teams that represent Azusa Pacific University, located in Azusa, California, in intercollegiate sports as a member of the Division III level of the National Collegiate Athletic Association (NCAA), primarily competing in the Southern California Intercollegiate Athletic Conference (SCIAC) for most of its sports since the 2026–27 academic year; while its women's swimming & diving team competes in the Pacific Collegiate Swim and Dive Conference (PCSC) and its women's water polo team competes in the Golden Coast Conference (GCC). From 2012–13 to 2025–26 they competed in the Pacific West Conference (PacWest) in Division II of the NCAA.

The Cougars previously competed in the Golden State Athletic Conference (GSAC) of the National Association of Intercollegiate Athletics (NAIA) from 1986–87 to 2011–12. On July 11, 2011 Azusa Pacific began the three-year transition process to becoming a member of the NCAA. Azusa Pacific University decided to end its football program in December 2020 due to financial restructuring. The team was revived in March 2025 with plans of playing in NCAA Division III and the Southern California Intercollegiate Athletic Conference starting in 2026.

The Cougars also maintain a secondary association with the National Christian College Athletic Association (NCCAA). They won four NCCAA men's basketball championships titles from 1969 to 1972 and returned to NCCAA competition during their transition to NCAA Division II.

Azusa Pacific Athletics achieved eight consecutive wins of the Directors’ Cup from 2005 to 2012, with a total of 108 GSAC Championships and 36 NAIA National Championships. Since joining NCAA Division II, the program has added 45 PacWest Conference Championships, four GNAC championships in football, and two NCAA Division II national championships.

== Varsity teams ==
Azusa Pacific competes in 17 intercollegiate varsity sports: Men's sports include baseball, basketball, cross country, football, soccer, tennis and track & field; while women's sports include acrobatics and tumbling, basketball, cross country, soccer, softball, swimming & diving, tennis, track & field, volleyball, water polo.

== National championships ==
=== Team ===
Sport	Association	Division	Year	Opponent/Runner-up	Score
Women's basketball (1)	NAIA	Division I	2011	Union (TN)	65–59
Women's cross country (1)	NAIA	Single	2008	Cedarville	66–97
Football (1)	NAIA	Single	1998	Olivet Nazarene	17–14
Men's soccer (1)	NAIA	Single	2007	Concordia Irvine	2–0
Women's soccer (1)	NAIA	Single	1998	Simon Fraser	2–1
Men's tennis (1)	NAIA	Single	2005	Santa Fe (NM)	5–3
Men's indoor track and field (8)	NAIA	Single	1996	Oklahoma Baptist	91–83 (+8)
Men's indoor track and field (8)	NAIA	Single	2002	Doane	72–37.5 (+34.5)
Men's indoor track and field (8)	NAIA	Single	2003	MidAmerica Nazarene	61–43.5 (+17.5)
Men's indoor track and field (8)	NAIA	Single	2004	Lindenwood	75–47.5 (+27.5)
Men's indoor track and field (8)	NAIA	Single	2007	Oklahoma Baptist	83–62 (+21)
Men's indoor track and field (8)	NAIA	Single	2008	Oklahoma Baptist	64.75–64 (+0.75)
Men's indoor track and field (8)	NAIA	Single	2009	Dickinson State	78.5–55 (+23.5)
Men's indoor track and field (8)	NAIA	Single	2010	Wayland Baptist	71–56 (+15)
Women's indoor track and field (3)	NAIA	Single	2003	Doane	121–51
Women's indoor track and field (3)	NAIA	Single	2004	Simon Fraser	95–65
Women's indoor track and field (3)	NAIA	Single	2012	Oklahoma Baptist	108–107
Men's outdoor track and field (15)	NAIA	Single	1983	Saginaw Valley State	94–36 (+58)
Men's outdoor track and field (15)	NAIA	Single	1984	Saginaw Valley State	93–77 (+16)
Men's outdoor track and field (15)	NAIA	Single	1985	Wayland Baptist	94–76 (+18)
Men's outdoor track and field (15)	NAIA	Single	1986	Wayland Baptist	112–86 (+25)
Men's outdoor track and field (15)	NAIA	Single	1987	Wayland Baptist	108–82 (+26)
Men's outdoor track and field (15)	NAIA	Single	1988	Prairie View A&M	112–63 (+48)
Men's outdoor track and field (15)	NAIA	Single	1989	Adams State	115–70 (+45)
Men's outdoor track and field (15)	NAIA	Single	1991	Central State (OH); Lubbock Christian	87–42 (+45)
Men's outdoor track and field (15)	NAIA	Single	1992	Central State (OH)	93–76 (+17)
Men's outdoor track and field (15)	NAIA	Single	1994	Central State (OH)	82–66 (+16)
Men's outdoor track and field (15)	NAIA	Single	1995	Lubbock Christian	105 1/3–104 (+1 1/3)
Men's outdoor track and field (15)	NAIA	Single	2001	Life	97–50 (+47)
Men's outdoor track and field (15)	NAIA	Single	2002	Life	54–50 (+4)
Men's outdoor track and field (15)	NAIA	Single	2008	Dickinson State	61–57 (+4)
Men's outdoor track and field (15)	NAIA	Single	2009	Dickinson State	80–71 (+9)
Women's outdoor track and field (6)	NAIA (4)	Single	2003	Lindenwood	86–78 (+8)
Women's outdoor track and field (6)	NAIA (4)	Single	2004	Lindenwood	104–76 (+28)
Women's outdoor track and field (6)	NAIA (4)	Single	2007	Cedarville	73–58
Women's outdoor track and field (6)	NAIA (4)	Single	2010	Oklahoma Baptist	61–60 (+1)
Women's outdoor track and field (6)	NCAA (2)	Division II	2021	Grand Valley State	81–77
Women's outdoor track and field (6)	NCAA (2)	Division II	2023	Minnesota State	66–57
