= Central State Marauders and Lady Marauders =

Sports teams of Central State University

- University: Central State University
- Conference: SIAC (primary)
- NCAA: Division II
- Athletic director: Kevicia Brown
- Location: Wilberforce, Ohio
- Varsity teams: 9 (5 men's, 4 women's)
- Football stadium: McPherson Stadium
- Basketball arena: Beacom/Lewis Gym
- Mascot: Marauder Man
- Nickname: Marauders and Lady Marauders
- Colors: Maroon and gold
- Website: maraudersports.com
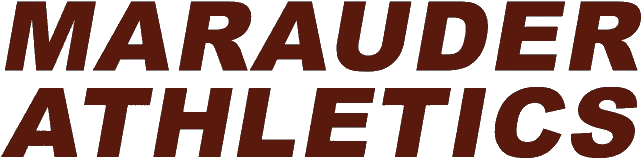

Team NCAA championships
- 2

The Central State Marauders and Lady Marauders are the athletic teams that represent Central State University, located in Wilberforce, Ohio, in intercollegiate sports as a member of the Division II level of the National Collegiate Athletic Association (NCAA), primarily competing in the Southern Intercollegiate Athletic Conference (SIAC) since the 2015–16 academic year (with football joining first as an affiliate member from 2013–14 to 2015 before upgrading for all sports). The Marauders and Lady Marauders previously competed in the D-II Great Midwest Athletic Conference (G-MAC) from 2012–13 to 2014–15, and as an NCAA D-II Independent from 2002–03 to 2011–12; as well as competing in the American Mideast Conference of the National Association of Intercollegiate Athletics (NAIA) from 2000–01 to 2001–02.

== Varsity teams ==
Central State competes in 11 intercollegiate varsity sports: Men's sports include basketball, cross country, football, track & field (indoor and outdoor) and volleyball; while women's sports include basketball, cross country, track & field (indoor and outdoor) and volleyball. Central State's main rivals are Kentucky State University and West Virginia State University.

== National championships ==
=== Team ===
Sport	Association	Division	Year	Runner-up	Score
Men's basketball (2)	NAIA	Single	1965	Oklahoma Baptist	85–51
Men's basketball (2)	NAIA	Single	1968	Fairmont State	51–48
Men's cross country (2)	NCAA	College	1960	Mankato State	72–109
Men's cross country (2)	NCAA	College	1962	Northern Illinois	77–96
Football (3)	NAIA	Division I	1990	Mesa State	38–16
Football (3)	NAIA	Division I	1992	Gardner–Webb	19–16
Football (3)	NAIA	Division I	1995	Northeastern State	37–7
Men's indoor track and field (2)	NAIA	Single	1993	Lubbock Christian	77–70
Men's indoor track and field (2)	NAIA	Single	1994	Azusa Pacific	84–76
Women's indoor track and field (2)	NAIA	Single	1993	Wayland Baptist	97–65
Women's indoor track and field (2)	NAIA	Single	1996	Wayland Baptist	96–86
Men's outdoor track and field (1)	NAIA	Single	1993	Prairie View A&M	99–70 (+29)
Women's outdoor track and field (5)	NAIA	Single	1991	Simon Fraser	115–81 (+34)
Women's outdoor track and field (5)	NAIA	Single	1992	Simon Fraser	140–125.5 (+14.5)
Women's outdoor track and field (5)	NAIA	Single	1993	Simon Fraser	132–116 (+16)
Women's outdoor track and field (5)	NAIA	Single	1994	Doane	96–71 (+25)
Women's outdoor track and field (5)	NAIA	Single	1996	Azusa Pacific	108–65.5 (+42.5)
