= Indiana Institute of Technology =

Private university in Fort Wayne, Indiana, US

- Seal of the Indiana Institute of Technology
- Former name: Indiana Technical College (1930–1963)
- Type: Private university
- Established: 1930; 96 years ago
- Endowment: $165.9 million (2025)
- President: Karl W. Einolf
- Faculty: 544 including full time and adjunct
- Students: 9,652
- Undergraduates: 8,848
- Postgraduates: 804
- Location: Fort Wayne, Indiana, U.S. 41°4′39.96″N 85°7′1.84″W
- Campus: 42 acres (17 ha); Urban
- Colors: Orange, Black & White
- Nickname: Warriors
- Sporting affiliations: NAIA – WHAC (primary); NAIA – Mid-South (wrestling); ACHA Division II & III
- Mascot: Maximus the Warrior
- Website: www.indianatech.edu

Indiana Institute of Technology (Indiana Tech) is a private university in Fort Wayne, Indiana, United States. It was founded in 1930 as Indiana Technical College by John A. Kalbfleisch, who was also the school's first president. The university is organized into three colleges and specializes in career-oriented degree programs in business, engineering, computer science, education, criminal justice, and others. In addition to the traditional semester-long class format, Indiana Tech also offers accelerated degree programs and online programs via its College of Professional Studies.

Beyond its main campus in Fort Wayne, Indiana Tech maintains regional classroom and enrollment centers in 13 locations, including Elkhart, Evansville, Fishers, Greenwood, Huntington, Indianapolis, Jeffersonville, Kendallville, Mishawaka, Munster, and Warsaw in Indiana; and Louisville and Fort Wright in Kentucky. Indiana Tech also has two enrollment centers in the Chicago area, located in Naperville and Wilmette, Illinois.

Indiana Tech fields eleven men's and eleven women's athletic teams that compete in the NAIA, in which Indiana Tech is a member of the Wolverine-Hoosier Athletic Conference for all intercollegiate athletics.

== History ==
History at a glance
Indiana Technical College	Established	1930	Type	for-profit
	Opened	1931
	Rechartered	1948	Type	non-profit
Indiana Institute of Technology	Renamed	1963

The Indiana Institute of Technology was founded as Indiana Technical College in 1930 as a for-profit private technical college by John A. Kalbfleisch, a former president of Indiana Business College, a for-profit business school. Indiana Tech was formally incorporated in 1931 and opened for classes that same year. The school was rechartered in August 1948 as a non-profit, endowed college.

In 1953, Indiana Tech purchased the 20-acre (8.1 ha) campus of Concordia College, east of downtown Fort Wayne, from the Lutheran Church–Missouri Synod as that school was being replaced by Concordia Senior College in a new suburban location north of the city. In 1963, Indiana Tech's name was changed from Indiana Technical College to Indiana Institute of Technology.

== Academics ==
Indiana Tech offers associate, bachelor's, master's, and doctoral degrees.

Indiana Tech is organized into the following colleges:

- College of Business
- Talwar College of Engineering and Computer Sciences
- College of Arts and Sciences

=== Doctoral programs ===
Indiana Tech's Ph.D. in Global Leadership, described as northeast Indiana's first doctoral program, celebrated its tenth anniversary during the 2019–20 academic year. In February 2025, the university announced an online Doctor of Business Administration (DBA) program, which launched that summer. The program uses a project-based curriculum and does not require a traditional dissertation.

=== Former law school ===
Indiana Tech Law School began classes in the Fall semester of 2013. The American Bar Association (ABA) granted provisional accreditation to Indiana Tech Law School as of March 12, 2016. Indiana Tech had to maintain provisional accreditation for a minimum of two years prior to seeking full ABA accreditation. However, due to the stated loss of nearly $20 million in operating losses with anticipated higher losses in the future, the Indiana Tech Board of Trustees voted unanimously to cease operation of the law school effective June 30, 2017.

=== Accreditation ===
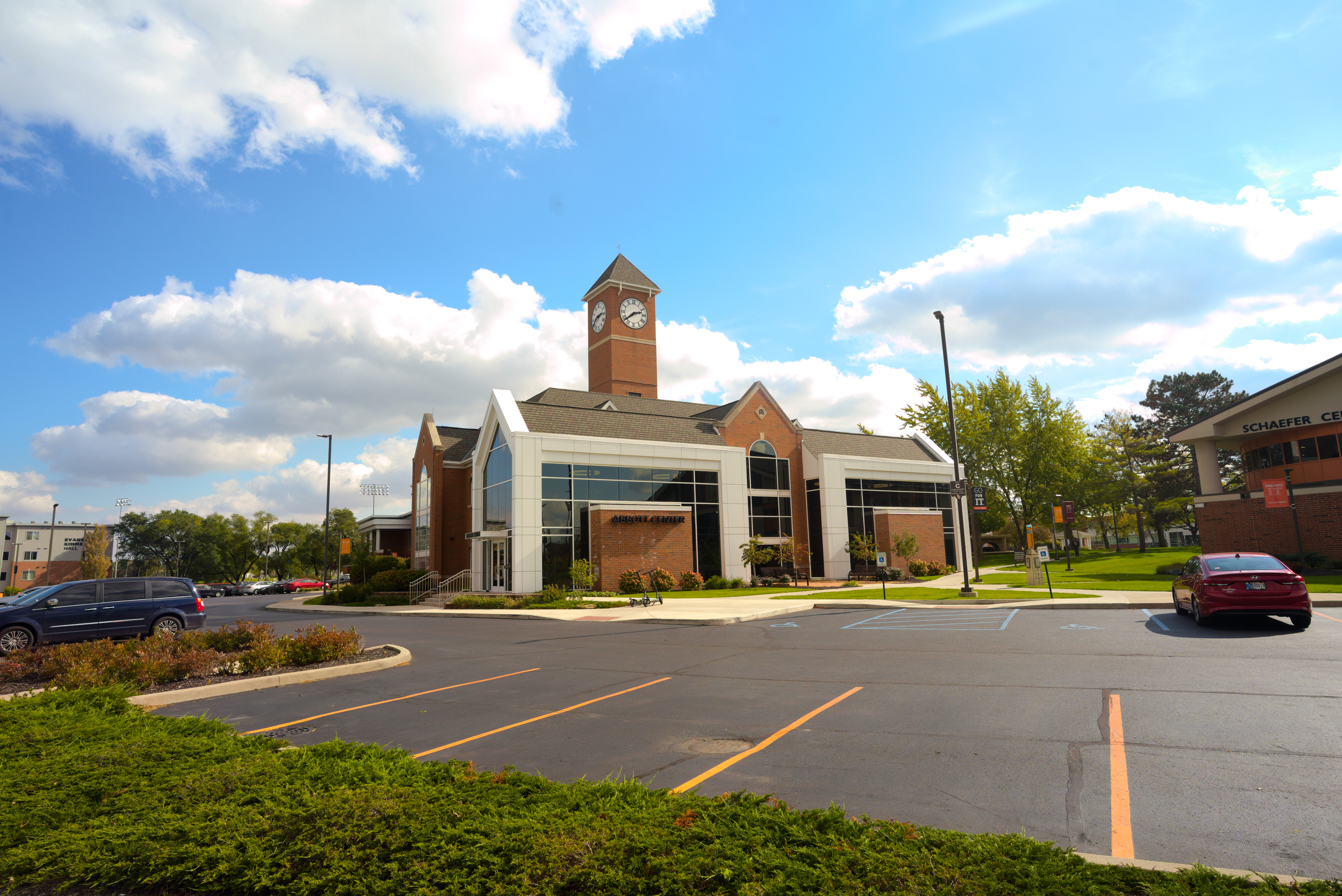
The Abbot Center at Indiana Tech

Indiana Tech is accredited by the Higher Learning Commission.. Specific programs and units are also accredited by discipline-specific accreditors, such as the biomedical, mechanical, computer and electrical engineering programs which are also accredited by the Accreditation Board for Engineering and Technology (ABET), the College of Business which is accredited by the International Assembly for Collegiate Business Education (IACBE), and the Health Information Technology and Health Information Management Programs which are accredited by the Commission on Accreditation for Health Informatics and Information Management Education (CAHIIM).

== Athletics ==
The Indiana Tech athletic teams are called the Warriors. The school's colors are orange and black with white accent. The university is a member of the National Association of Intercollegiate Athletics (NAIA), primarily competing in the Wolverine-Hoosier Athletic Conference (WHAC) for most of its sports since the 1998–99 academic year; while its women's wrestling team competes in the Mid-South Conference (MSC); and its ice hockey team competes in Varsity Division and Division III of the American Collegiate Hockey Association (ACHA). The Warriors previously competed in the Chicagoland Collegiate Athletic Conference (CCAC) from about 1978–79 to 1997–98; and in the Mid-Central College Conference (MCCC; known as the Crossroads League since the 2012–13 school year) from 1959–60 to 1977–78.

Indiana Tech competes in 26 intercollegiate varsity sports: Men's sports include baseball, basketball, bowling, cross country, golf, ice hockey, lacrosse, soccer, tennis, track & field, volleyball, rugby, and wrestling; while women's sports include basketball, bowling, cross country, golf, ice hockey, lacrosse, soccer, softball, tennis, track & field, volleyball and wrestling; and co-ed sports include eSports.

Warrior teams have won 11 national titles, including in women's lacrosse and most recently in men's and women's track and field, with the Warrior men earning four straight NAIA national titles starting with the 2013 outdoor national championship. The women's track and field team has been similarly dominant, with the team earning back-to-back outdoor NAIA national titles in 2013 and 2014. Over the years, Indiana Tech teams have collectively earned 99 national tournament appearances, 34 WHAC regular season championships, and 17 WHAC tournament championships. Individually, the university has produced 451 All-Americans, 308 Daktronics NAIA Scholar-Athletes, and 32 NAIA Individual National Champions.

=== Esports ===
In August 2016, Indiana Tech announced the launch of a varsity eSports program that began competition during the fall 2017 academic year. The program competes in the National Association of Collegiate Esports (NACE), of which Indiana Tech is a founding member. Indiana Tech has eSports teams for four games: Overwatch, League of Legends, Rocket League, and Hearthstone.

== Student life ==
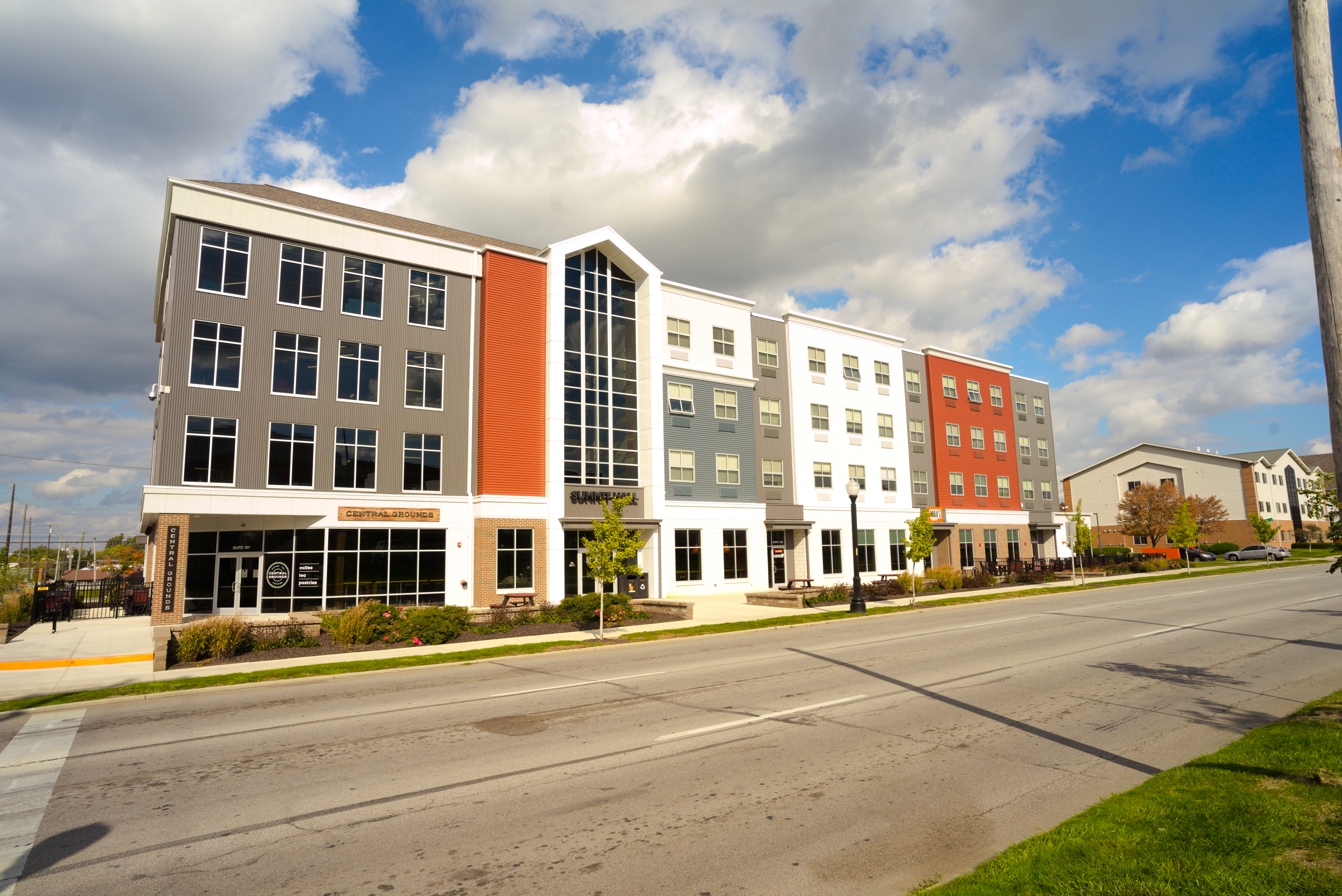
Summit Hall

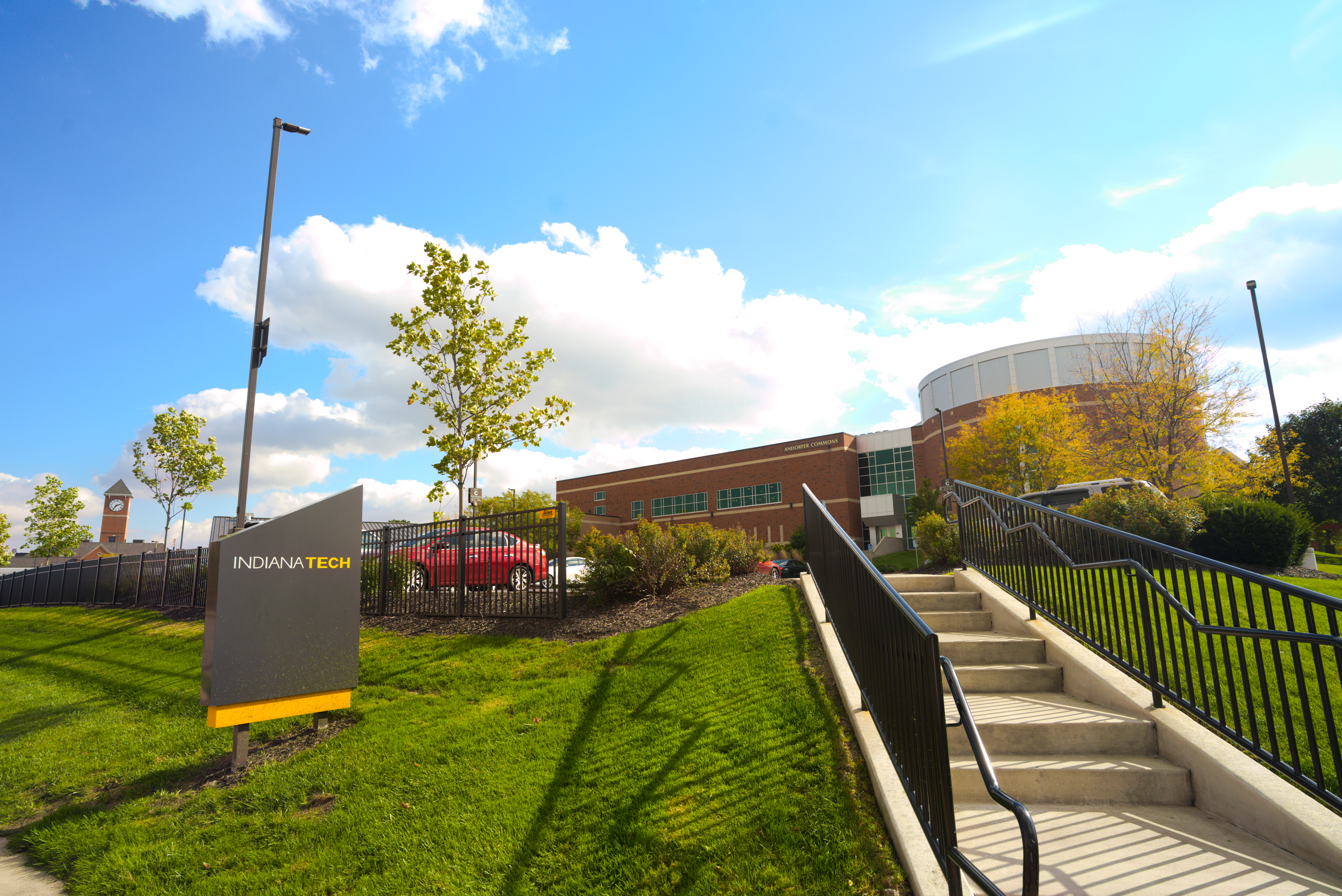
Andorfer Commons

Indiana Tech has a variety of activities and organizations contributing to student life on campus, including many events organized each year through its office of Student Life. The main campus features a movie theater showing free weekly features; a performing arts theater for live performances; a rec center with a bowling alley, video gaming, pool and ping-pong tables; an art gallery; and two main dining facilities, including a cafe featuring Starbucks coffee in its new Academic Center, as well as a third option in the new Max's Bistro, located in Summit Hall.

Indiana Tech is also home to a variety of clubs, honor societies, student professional organizations, a local sorority and a national fraternity.

== Notable alumni ==
- Rodney Bartholomew, professional basketball player
- JuJuan Cooley, professional basketball player
- Alex Horton, professional bowler
- Josh Judy, professional baseball pitcher
