= Texas Southern Tigers =

Collegiate sports club in the United States

- University: Texas Southern University
- NCAA: Division I (FCS)
- Conference: Southwestern Athletic Conference
- Athletic director: Kevin Granger
- Location: Houston, Texas
- Varsity teams: 16 (7 men's and 9 women's)
- Football stadium: Shell Energy Stadium
- Basketball arena: Health and Physical Education Arena
- Baseball stadium: MacGregor Park
- Softball stadium: Memorial Park
- Soccer stadium: Alexander Durley Sports Complex
- Nickname: Tigers
- Colors: Maroon and gray
- Mascot: Tex The Tiger
- Website: tsusports.com

The Texas Southern Tigers represent Texas Southern University in Houston, Texas, in intercollegiate athletics. They field sixteen teams including men's and women's basketball, cross country, golf, and track and field; women's-only bowling, soccer, softball, tennis, and volleyball; and men's-only baseball and football. The Tigers compete in the NCAA Division I and are members of the Southwestern Athletic Conference.

== Sports sponsored ==
Men's sports	Women's sports
Baseball	Basketball
Basketball	Bowling
Cross Country	Cross Country
Football	Golf
Golf	Soccer
Track and field^{†}	Softball
	Track and field^{†}
	Volleyball
† – Track and field includes both indoor and outdoor

=== Baseball ===
The baseball program's first season was 1965, and it has been a member of the NCAA Division I Southwestern Athletic Conference since the start of the 1999 season. Its home venue is MacGregor Park, owned by the city of Houston. The program has appeared in 5 NCAA Tournaments. It has won five conference tournament championships and no regular-season conference titles.

=== Men's basketball ===
The men’s basketball program has appeared in ten NCAA Tournaments, the most in the conference. Their combined record is 3–10, tying them with Alcorn State for the most wins by a SWAC school in the tournament.

=== Women's basketball ===
The women’s basketball team has appeared in the NCAA Division I women's basketball tournament once. The Lady Tigers have a record of 0–1.

=== Football ===
The football team plays in the NCAA's Division I FCS as a member of the Southwestern Athletic Conference (SWAC). In 2012, the Tigers moved into the new Shell Energy Stadium, built for the city's Major League Soccer team, the Houston Dynamo. It replaced the Alexander Durley Sports Complex as the home of Tiger football. 60 former members of the football program have gone on to play in the NFL.

=== Competitive cheer ===
Texas Southern cheerleading team was the first HBCU team to win a national title with the National Cheerleaders Association in April 2023.

== Athletics partnership ==
In 2018, TSU's athletics department entered a partnership with Under Armour. As part of the multi-year agreement, Under Armour will provide on-field and training gear for 16 varsity sports.

== Gallery ==
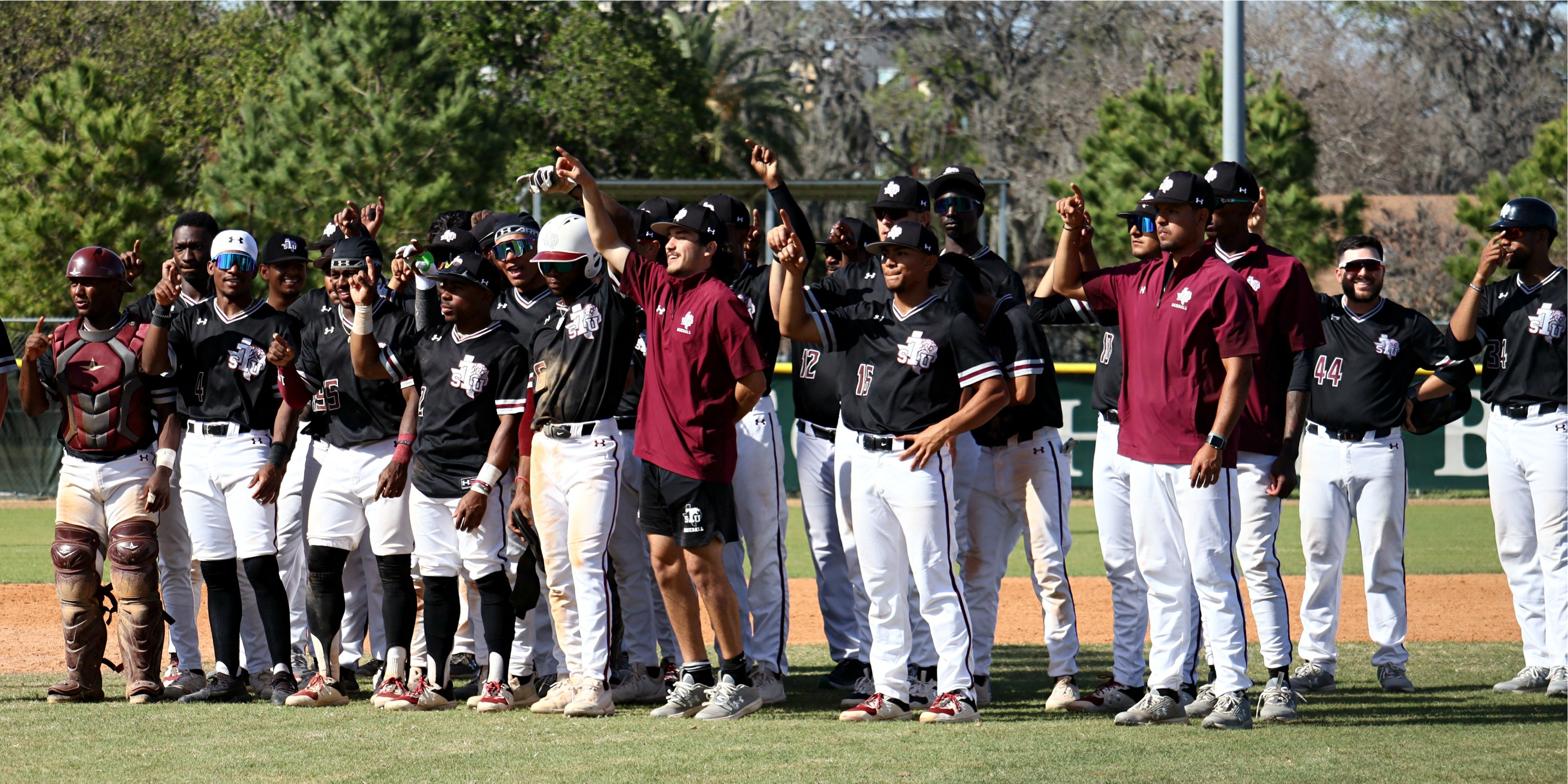
The Tigers baseball team in 2022

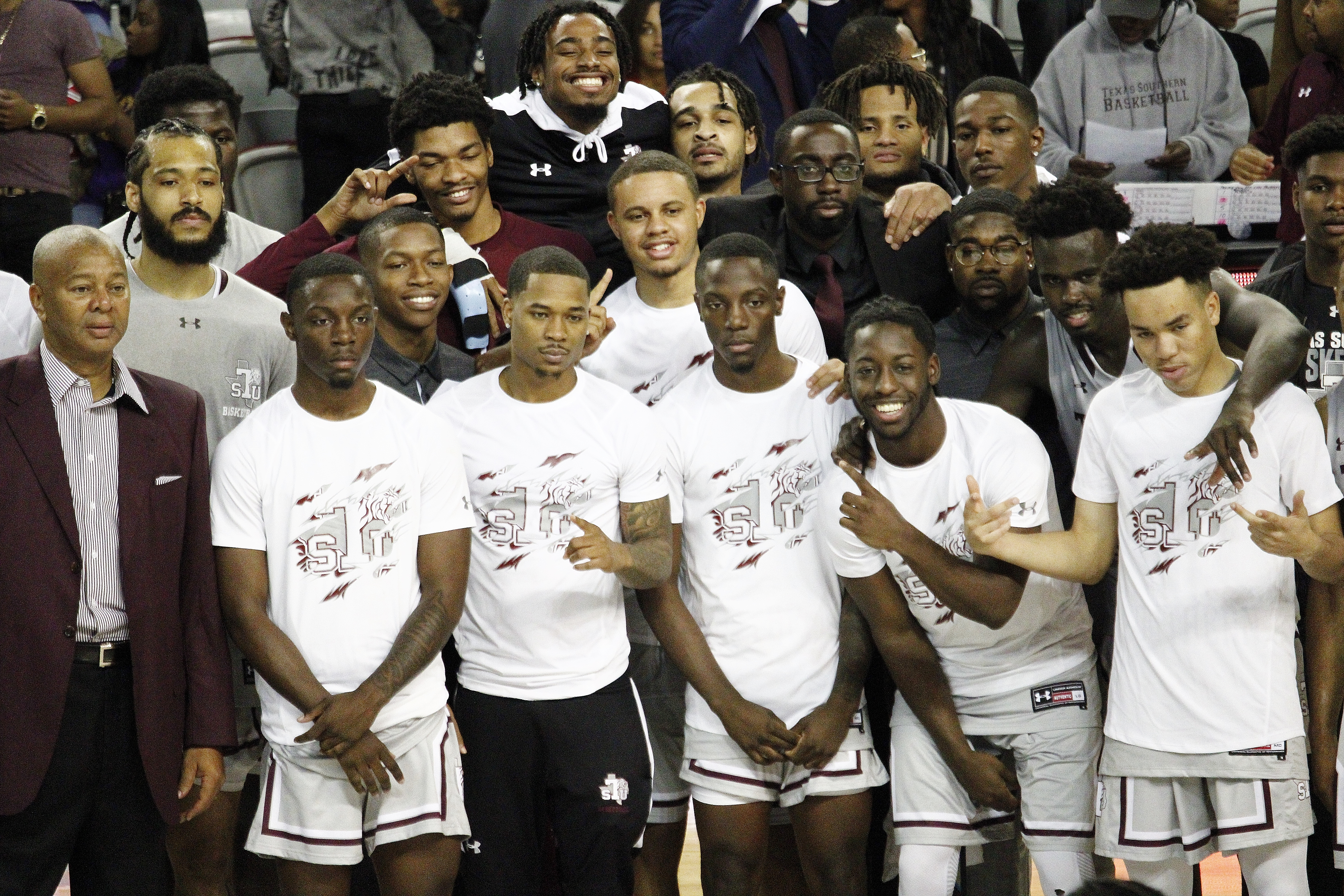
The Tigers basketball team in 2020

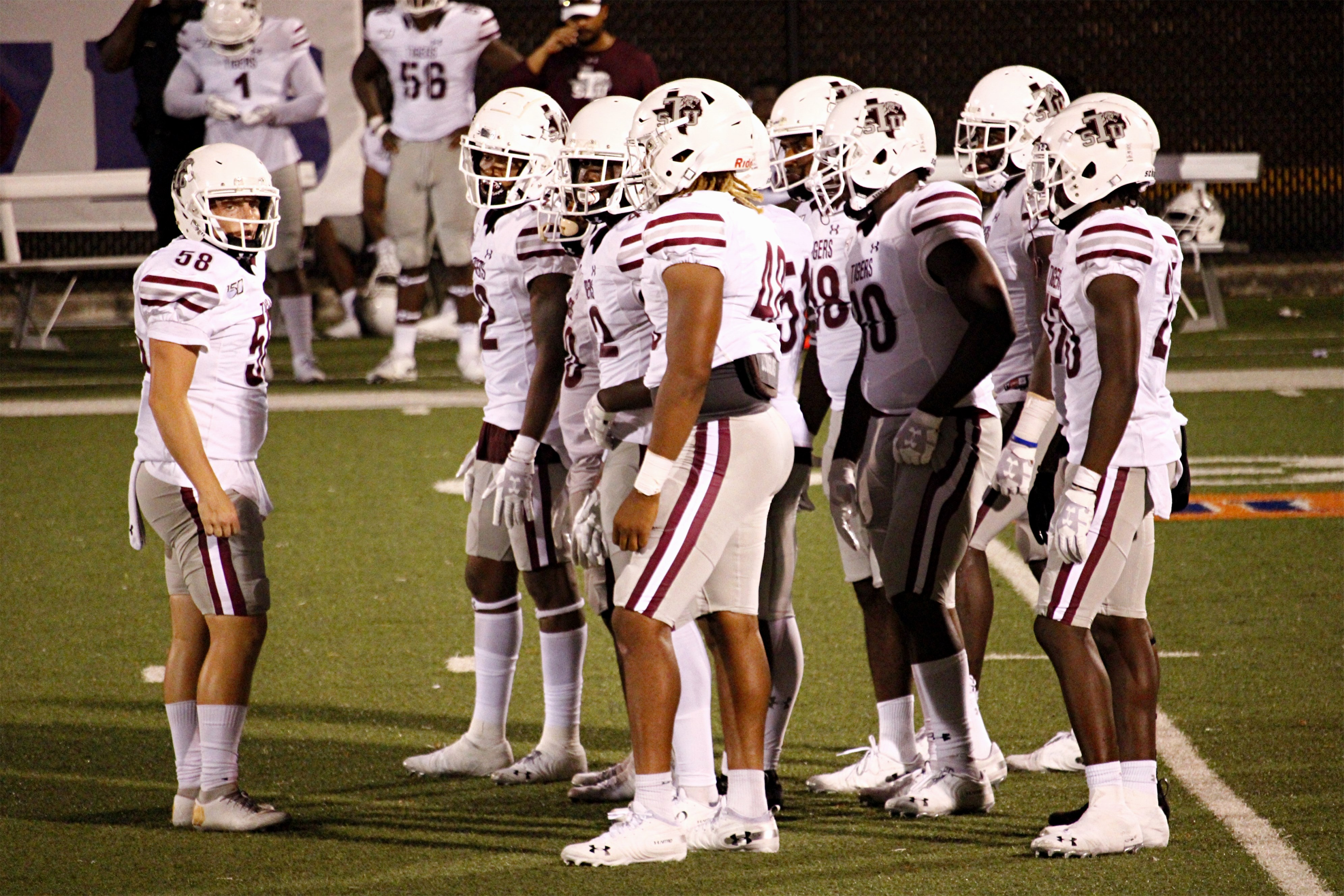
A Tigers football game in 2019

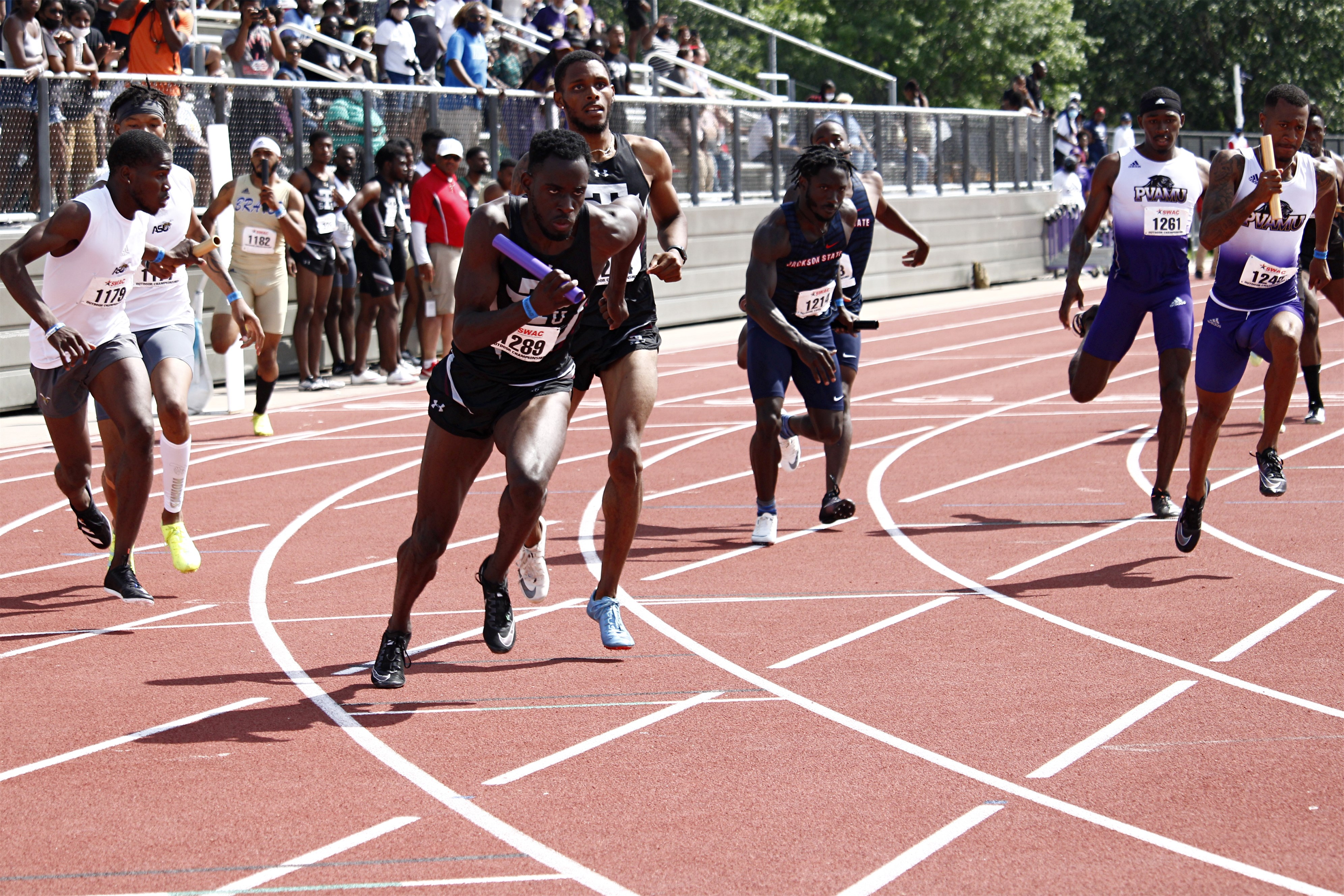
A Tigers relay team (second from left) in 2021

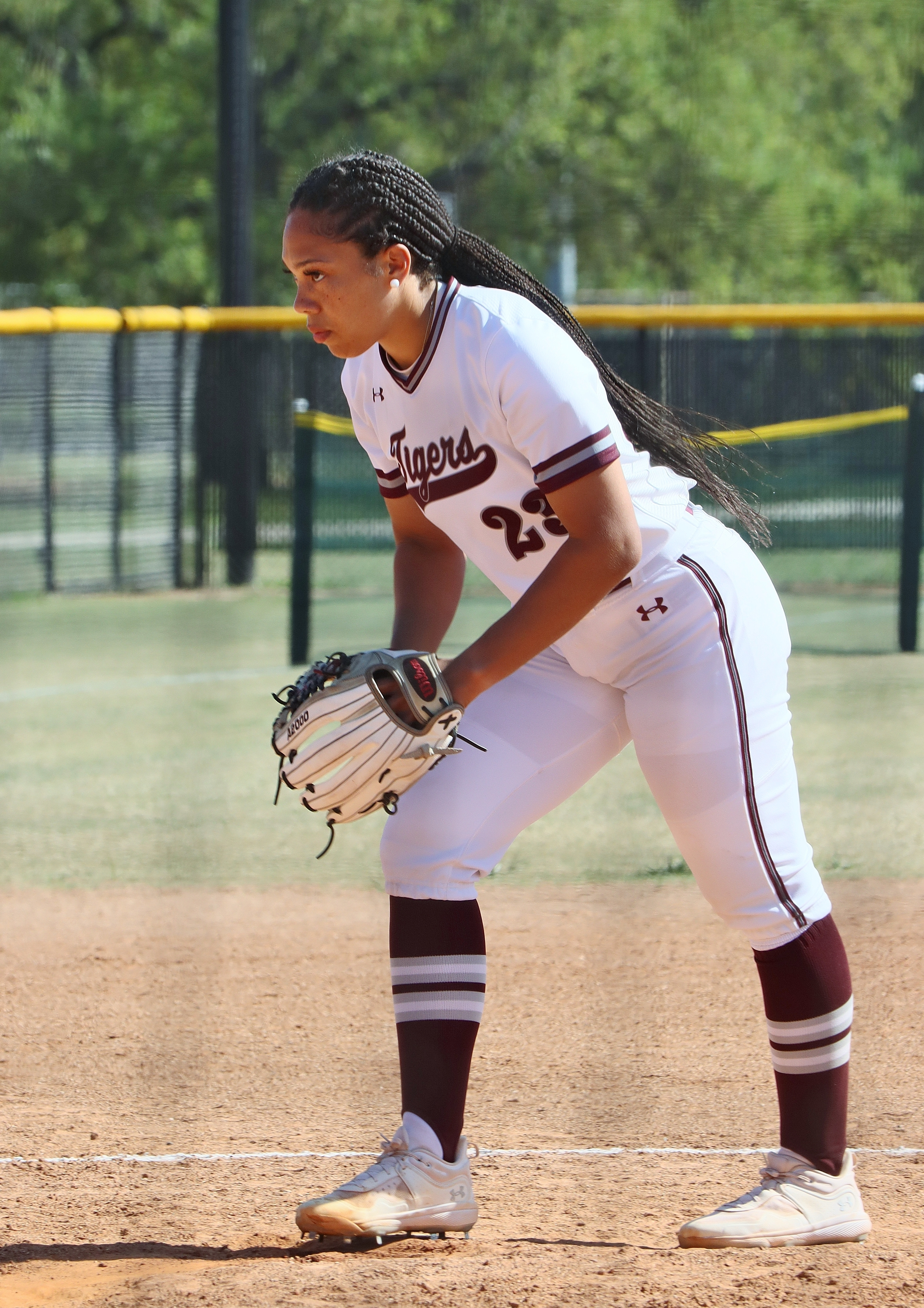
A Lady Tigers softball player in 2022

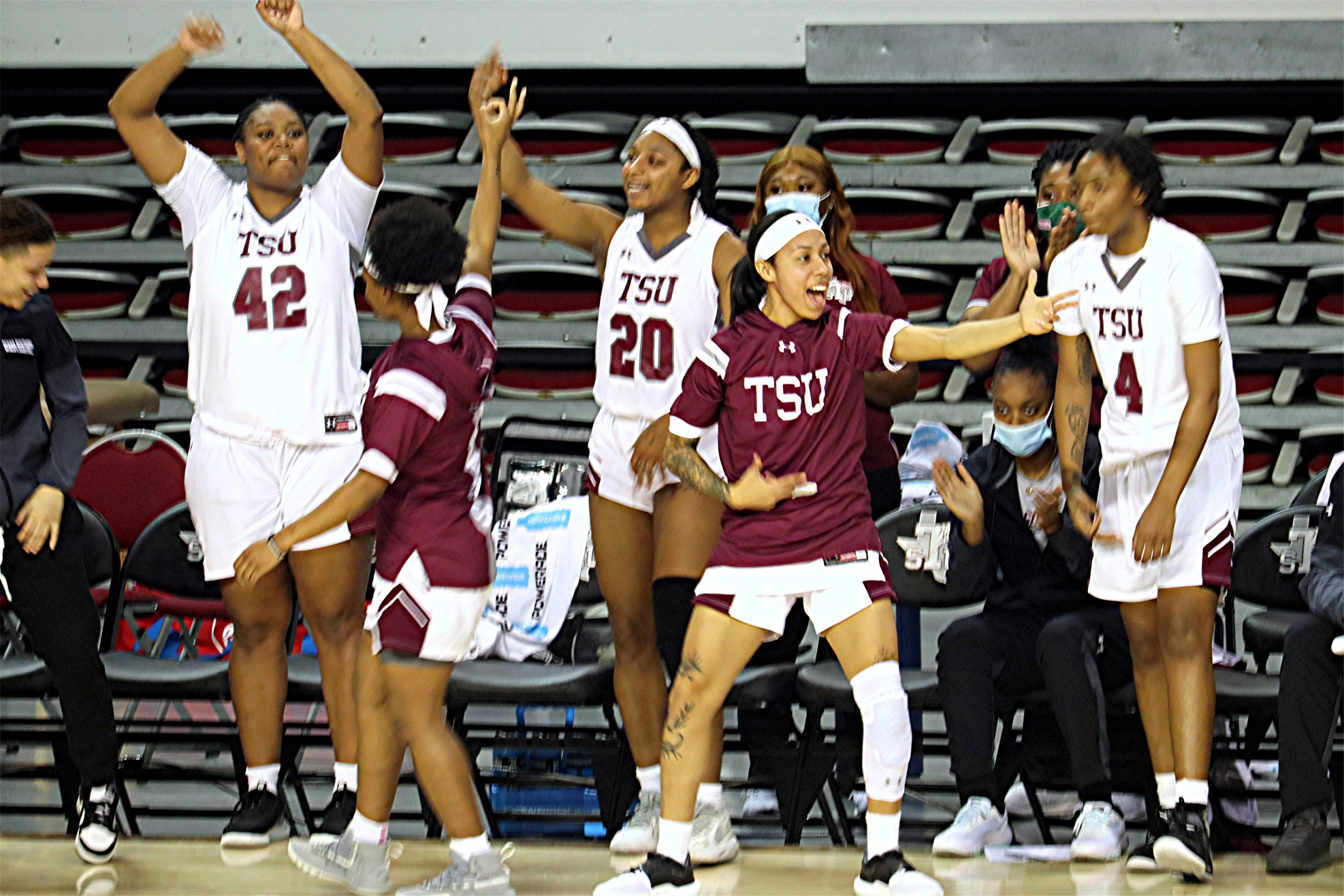
A Lady Tigers basketball game in 2022
