= List of Malone Pioneers head football coaches =

The Malone Pioneers program was a college football team that represented Malone University. The team had 7 head coaches since its first recorded football game in 1993 until the program was discontinued after the 2018 season. The final head coach was Fred Thomas who took the position beginning with the 2015 season after serving as the assistant coach for the program in 2014. The university announced in February 2019 that it had voted to cancel the program after 26 seasons as a cost-cutting measure.

== Key ==
Key to symbols in coaches list
General		Overall		Conference		Postseason (Note: Although the first Rose Bowl Game was played in 1902, it has been continuously played since the 1916 game, and is recognized as the oldest bowl game by the NCAA. "—" indicates any season prior to 1916 when postseason games were not played.)	
No.	Order of coaches (Note: A running total of the number of head coaches, with coaches who served separate tenures being counted only once. Interim head coaches are represented with "Int" and are not counted in the running total. "—" indicates the team played but either without a coach or no coach is on record. "X" indicates an interim year without play.)	GC	Games coached	CW	Conference wins	PW	Postseason wins
DC	Division championships	OW	Overall wins	CL	Conference losses	PL	Postseason losses
CC	Conference championships	OL	Overall losses	CT	Conference ties	PT	Postseason ties
NC	National championships	OT	Overall ties (Note: Overtime rules in college football were introduced in 1996, making ties impossible in the period since.)	C%	Conference winning percentage		
†	Elected to the College Football Hall of Fame	O%	Overall winning percentage (Note: When computing the win–loss percentage, a tie counts as half a win and half a loss.)				

== Coaches ==
No.	Name	Term	GC	OW	OL	OT	O%	CW	CL	CT	C%	PW	PL	CCs	Awards
1	Joe Palmisano	1993–1994	19	9	9	1	.500	—	—	—	—	—	—	—	—
2	Mike Gravier	1995–1998	43	30	12	1	.709	—	—	—	—	—	2	1	—
3	Steve Saulnier	1999–2001	31	10	21	0	.323	—	—	—	—	—	—	—	—
4	Dan Hanson	2002–2005	40	13	27	0	.325	—	—	—	—	—	—	—	—
5	Mike Gardner	2006–2009	43	25	18	0	.581	—	—	—	—	1	2	—	KCAC Coach of the Year (2005); AFCA NAIA Assistant Coach of the Year (2003); AFLAC Assistant Coach of the Year (2003)
6	Eric Hehman	2010–2015	63	11	52	0	.175	5	41	—	.109	—	—	—	—
7	Fred Thomas	2016–2018	29	4	25	0	.138	2	15	—	.118	—	—	—	—

== Details ==
The following are details on coaches that do not have articles on Wikipedia. For coaches with articles on Wikipedia, see links in the table above.

=== Dan Hanson ===
==== Coaching history ====
===== Assistant coaching positions =====
Hanson first served as defensive coordinator at Olivet Nazarene University in Kankakee, Illinois. He later moved to Canton, Ohio to be the defensive coordinator at Malone College.

===== Malone University =====
Hanson was promoted to become the fourth head coach for Malone. He held that position for four seasons, from 2002 until 2005, when he resigned for personal reasons. His career coaching record at Malone was 13 wins, 27 losses, and 0 ties. This ranks him third at Malone in total wins and fourth at Malone in winning percentage. His conference record in the Mid-States Football Association was 5 wins and 21 losses during his tenure.

Hanson's inaugural 2002 season started out with three consecutive wins and a national ranking but was answered with 3 consecutive losses. The team would win one more before finishing 2002 with a 4-6 record. Despite the losing record, Malone outscored their opponents 245 to 196.

===== Head coaching record =====
Year	Team	Overall	Conference	Standing	Bowl/playoffs	NAIA Coach's Poll^{#}
Malone Pioneers (NAIA) (Mid-States Football Association) (2002–2005)
2002	Malone	4-6				
2003	Malone	2-8				
2004	Malone	4-6				
2005	Malone	3-7				
Malone College:		13-27	5-21			
Total:		13-27				
National championship Conference title Conference division title or championship game berth
^{#}Rankings from final Coaches Poll.

==== Playing History ====
Before taking an assistant coach position at Olivet Nazarene University, Hanson played football for the school as an undergraduate while working on his bachelor's degree.

==== Personal life ====
After leaving coaching, Hanson took a position as the Administrative Pastor at Canton First Church of the Nazarene, where he now serves as lead pastor. Hanson earned his Bachelor of Arts in Religion from Olivet Nazarene University and also holds two master's degrees in religion and teaching. Hanson has also continued to be involved in the sport of American football through camps and youth involvement.
