= Great Midwest Athletic Conference men's basketball tournament =

- Conference basketball championship
- Sport: Basketball
- Conference: Great Midwest Athletic Conference
- Number of teams: 8
- Format: Single-elimination tournament
- Played: 2013–present
- Current champion: Walsh (5th)
- Most championships: Walsh (5)
- Official website: G-MAC men's basketball

Host locations
- Home court of higher-seeded team (2013–present)

The Great Midwest Athletic Conference (G-MAC) men's basketball tournament is the annual conference basketball championship tournament for the Great Midwest Athletic Conference. The tournament has been held annually since 2013. It is a single-elimination tournament and seeding is based on regular season records.

The winner, declared conference champion, receives the conference's automatic bid to the NCAA Men's Division II Basketball Championship.

== Results ==
Year	Champions	Score	Runner-up	Venue
2013	Cedarville	70–59	Trevecca Nazarene	Callan Athletic Center (Cedarville, OH)
2014	Alderson Broaddus	65–61	Kentucky Wesleyan	Rex Pyles Arena (Philippi, WV)
2015	Alderson Broaddus	50–47	Kentucky Wesleyan	Rex Pyles Arena (Philippi, WV)
2016	Kentucky Wesleyan	78–69	Trevecca Nazarene	Owensboro Sportscenter (Owensboro, KY)
2017	Kentucky Wesleyan	91–63	Alderson Broaddus	Owensboro Sportscenter (Owensboro, KY)
2018	Ohio Dominican	71–53	Hillsdale	Croy Gymnasium (Findlay, OH)
2019	Walsh	58-52	Findlay	Croy Gymnasium (Findlay, OH)
2020	Walsh	69–48	Kentucky Wesleyan	Croy Gymnasium (Findlay, OH)
2021	Malone	77–59	Cedarville	Dawn Tibbetts Potter Arena (Hillsdale, MI)
2022	Walsh	76–62	Cedarville	Alumni Arena (North Canton, OH)
2023	Ashland	82–78	Malone	Alumni Arena (North Canton, OH)
2024	Walsh	65–56	Thomas More	Alumni Arena (North Canton, OH)
2025	Malone	76–63	Thomas More	Dawn Tibbetts Potter Arena (Hillsdale, MI)
2026	Walsh	86–73	Lake Erie	Alumni Arena (North Canton, OH)

== Championship records ==
School	Finals Record	Finals Appearances	Championship Years
Walsh	5–0	5	2019, 2020, 2022, 2024, 2026
Kentucky Wesleyan	2–3	5	2016, 2017
Alderson Broaddus	2–1	3	2014, 2015
Malone	2–0	2	2021, 2025
Cedarville	1–2	3	2013
Ashland	1–0	1	2023
Ohio Dominican	1–0	1	2018
Trevecca Nazarene	0–2	2	
Thomas More	0–2	2	
Lake Erie	0–1	1	
Findlay	0–1	1	
Hillsdale	0–1	1	

- Northwood and Tiffin have yet to advance to a tournament final.
- Davis & Elkins, Urbana, UVA Wise, Central State, Ohio Valley, and Salem never qualified for the tournament finals as G-MAC members.
- Schools highlighted in pink are former G-MAC members.

== See also ==
- Great Midwest Athletic Conference women's basketball tournament
