= Great Midwest Athletic Conference women's basketball tournament =

- Conference basketball championship
- Sport: Basketball
- Conference: Great Midwest Athletic Conference
- Format: Single-elimination tournament
- Played: 2013–present
- Current champion: Northwood (1st)
- Most championships: Ashland (4)
- Official website: G-MAC women's basketball

The Great Midwest Athletic Conference (G-MAC) women's basketball tournament is the annual conference women's basketball championship tournament for the Great Midwest Athletic Conference. The tournament has been held annually since 2013. It is a single-elimination tournament and seeding is based on regular season records.

The winner receives the G-MAC's automatic bid to the NCAA Division II women's basketball tournament.

Ashland have been the most successful program, with four titles.

== Results ==
Year	Champions	Score	Runner-up	Venue
2013	Urbana	70–63	Trevecca Nazarene	Nashville, TN
2014	Kentucky Wesleyan	80–76	Trevecca Nazarene	Nashville, TN
2015	Cedarville	63–52	Kentucky Wesleyan	Cedarville, OH
2016	Cedarville (2)	72–65	Ursuline	Pepper Pike, OH
2017	Malone	72–64	Ursuline	Pepper Pike, OH
2018	Hillsdale	81–70	Findlay	Cedarville, OH
2019	Walsh	84–68	Kentucky Wesleyan	North Canton, OH
2020	Walsh (2)	81–58	Kentucky Wesleyan	North Canton, OH
2021	Tiffin	61–57	Kentucky Wesleyan	Cedarville, OH
2022	Ashland	73–63	Walsh	Ashland, OH
2023	Ashland (2)	83–65	Trevecca Nazarene	Ashland, OH
2024	Ashland (3)	99–58	Trevecca Nazarene	Ashland, OH
2025	Ashland (4)	69–57	Hillsdale	Ashland, OH
2026	Northwood	64–53	Malone	Midland, MI

== Championship records ==
School	Finals Record	Finals Appearances	Years
Ashland	4–0	4	2022, 2023, 2024, 2025
Walsh	2–1	3	2019, 2020
Cedarville	2–0	2	2015, 2016
Kentucky Wesleyan	1–4	5	2014
Hillsdale	1–1	2	2018
Malone	1–1	2	2017
Northwood	1–0	1	2026
Tiffin	1–0	1	2021
Urbana	1–0	1	2013
Trevecca Nazarene	0–4	4	
Ursuline	0–2	2	
Findlay	0–1	1	

- Lake Erie, Ohio Dominican, and Thomas More have not yet advanced to the tournament final.
- Alderson Broaddus, Central State, Davis & Elkins, Ohio Valley, Salem International, and UVA Wise never reached the tournament final as G-MAC members.
- Schools highlighted in pink are former G-MAC members.

== See also ==
- Great Midwest Athletic Conference men's basketball tournament
