= Eastern New Mexico Greyhounds =

Collegiate sports club in the United States

- University: Eastern New Mexico University
- Nickname: Greyhounds
- NCAA: Division II
- Conference: LSC (primary)
- Athletic director: Kevin Fite
- Location: Portales, New Mexico
- Varsity teams: 15 (6 men's, 8 women's, 1 co-ed)
- Football stadium: Al Whitehead Field at Steve Loy Family Foundation Stadium
- Basketball arena: Steve Loy Family Foundation Arena
- Baseball stadium: Greyhound Baseball Field
- Softball stadium: Greyhound Softball Field
- Soccer stadium: Al Whitehead Field at Greyhound Stadium
- Colors: Green and silver
- Mascot: Ralphie and Roxie
- Website: goeasternathletics.com
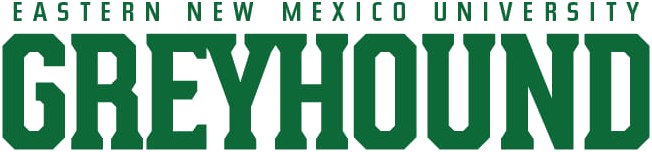

The Eastern New Mexico Greyhounds are the athletic teams that represent Eastern New Mexico University, located in Portales, New Mexico, in NCAA Division II intercollegiate sports. The Greyhounds compete as members of the Lone Star Conference for all 12 varsity sports. Until 2015, Eastern New Mexico had used Zias for the names of female sports teams, but the school announced that Eastern New Mexico will end the use of the Zias name for the female teams, choosing to have Greyhounds for both male and female teams.

== Varsity sports ==
=== Teams ===
Men's sports	Women's sports
Baseball	Basketball
Basketball	Cross country
Cross country	Rodeo
Football	Soccer
Rodeo	Softball
Track & field	Stunt
	Track & field
	Volleyball

=== Basketball ===
The men's basketball team won the 1969 NAIA Basketball Championships.

Jon Dalzell played basketball for the Greyhounds and in 1981–82 averaged 15.8 points per game, and was named All Conference.

=== Football ===
There have been 18 head coaches of the football team since it began playing in 1934. ENMU has won the Lone Star Conference 6 times, in 1991, 1999, 2000, 2004, 2005, and 2013.

==== Rivalries ====
===== West Texas A&M =====
The Wagon Wheel is a traveling trophy that is given to the winner of the Eastern New Mexico–West Texas A&M football game. The trophy was introduced in 1986 by Dallan Sanders, the Housing Director at ENMU. The wheel is placed on the stadium hill of the host team with the winning team running up the hill to take possession of the wheel. Following the 2023 meeting, ENMU leads the overall series 23–19 and the trophy series 18–17.

== National championships ==
=== Team ===
Sport	Association	Division	Year	Opponent/Runner-up	Score
Men's cross country (2)	NAIA	Single	1973	Malone	35–99
Men's cross country (2)	NAIA	Single	1974	U.S. International	28–166
Men's outdoor track and field (2)	NAIA	Single	1974	Southern California College	67–58 (+9)
Men's outdoor track and field (2)	NAIA	Single	1976	Northwestern State	56–52 (+4)

== Gallery ==
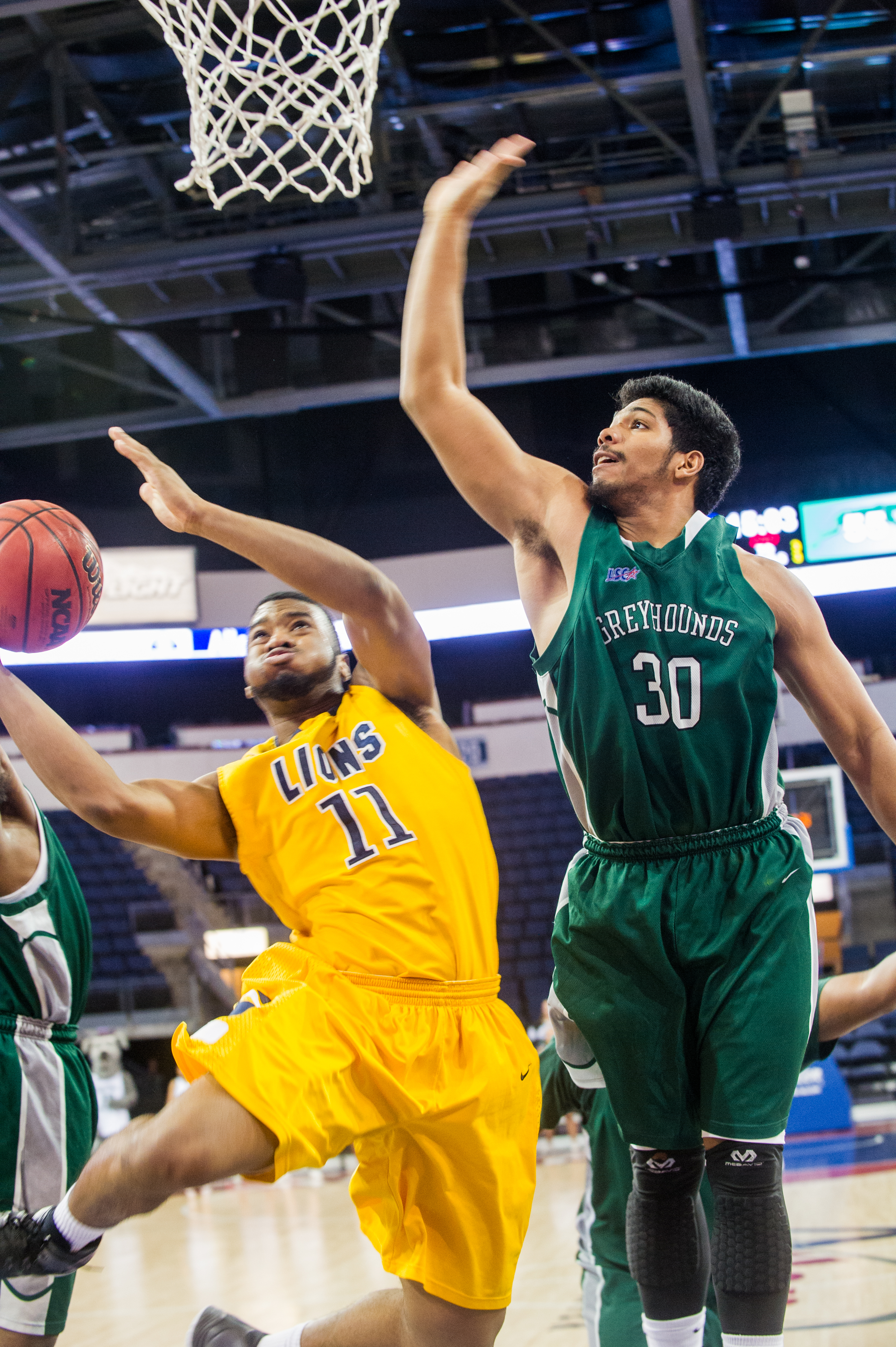
Men's basketball game

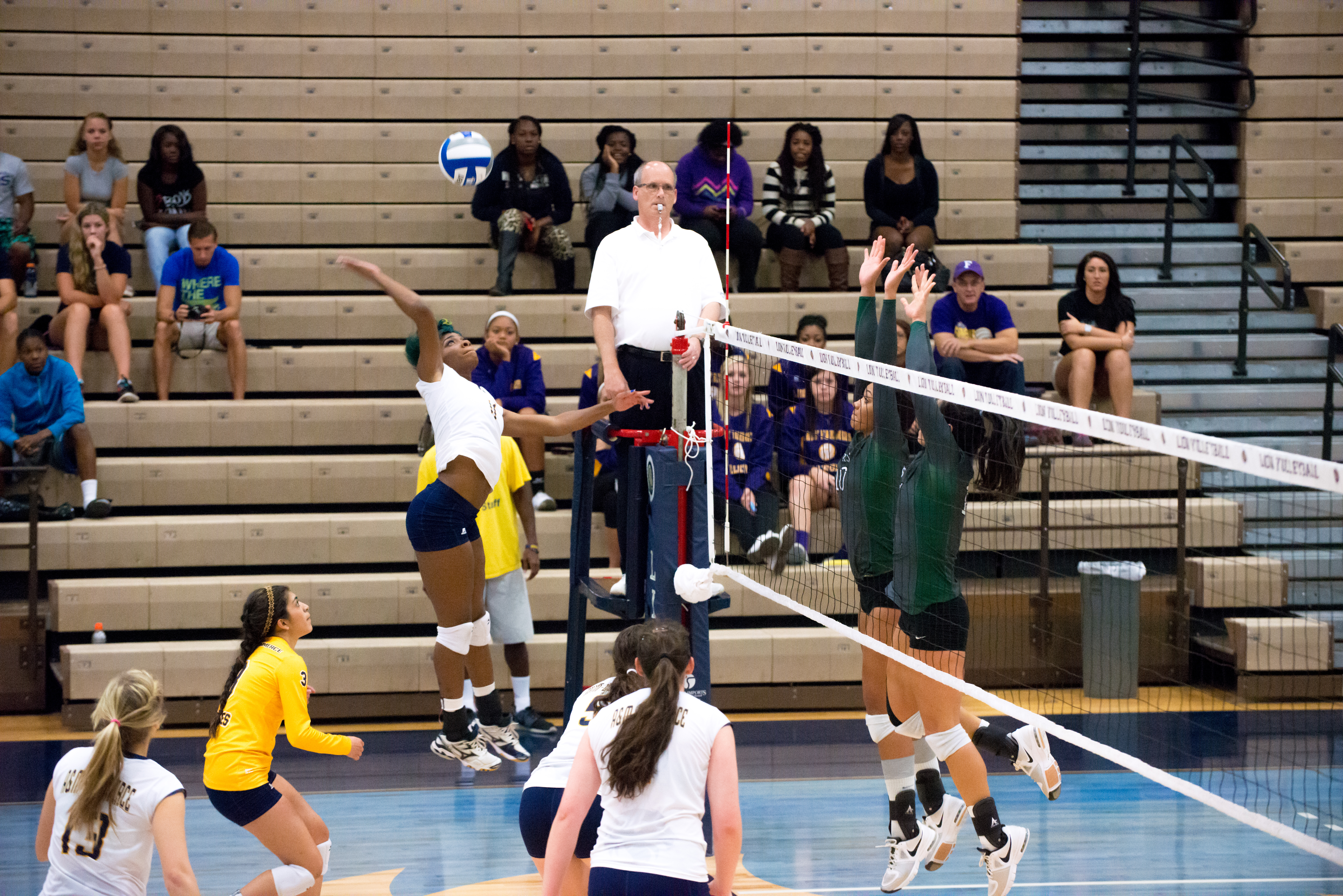
Volleyball game

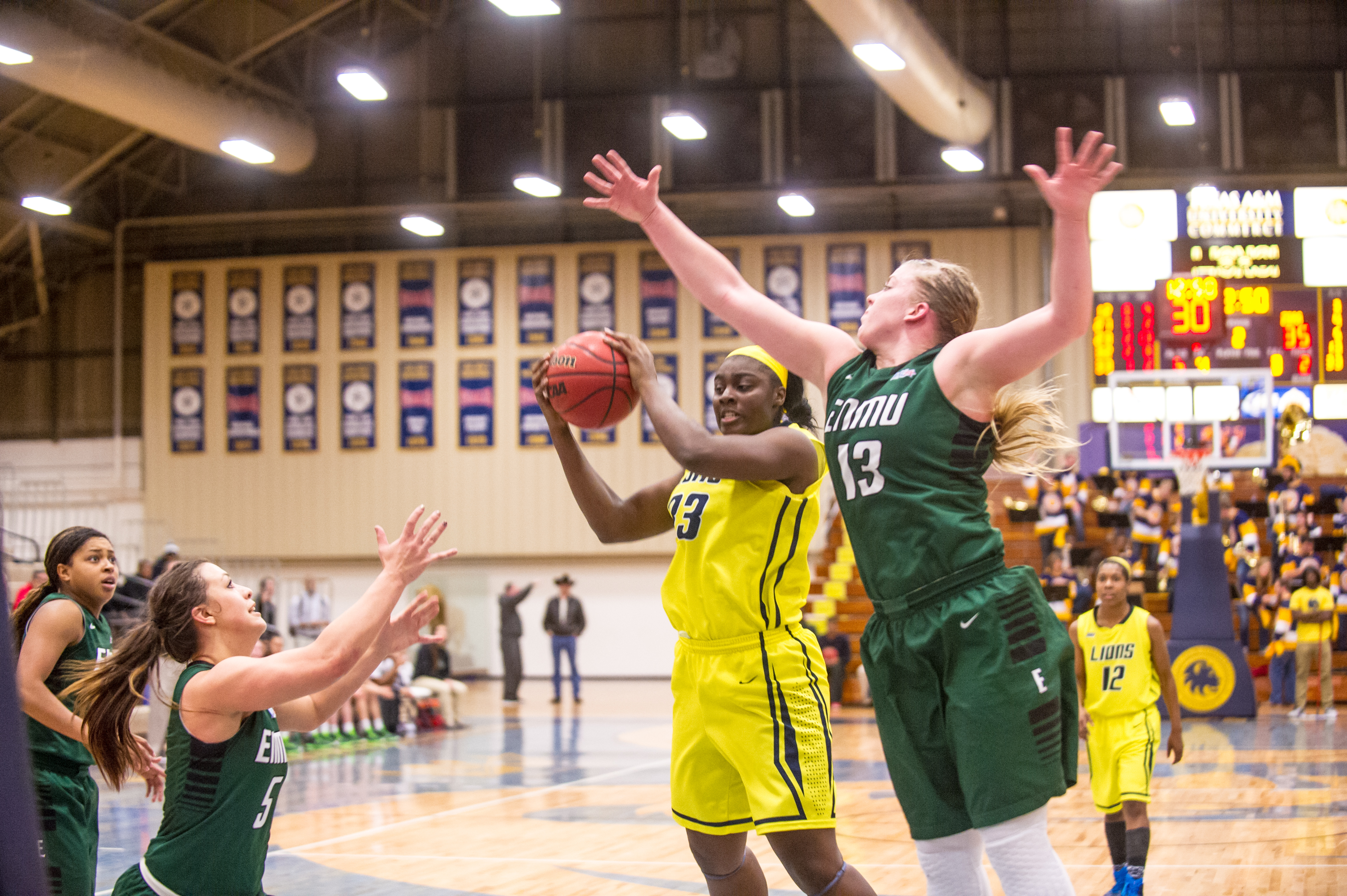
Women's basketball game

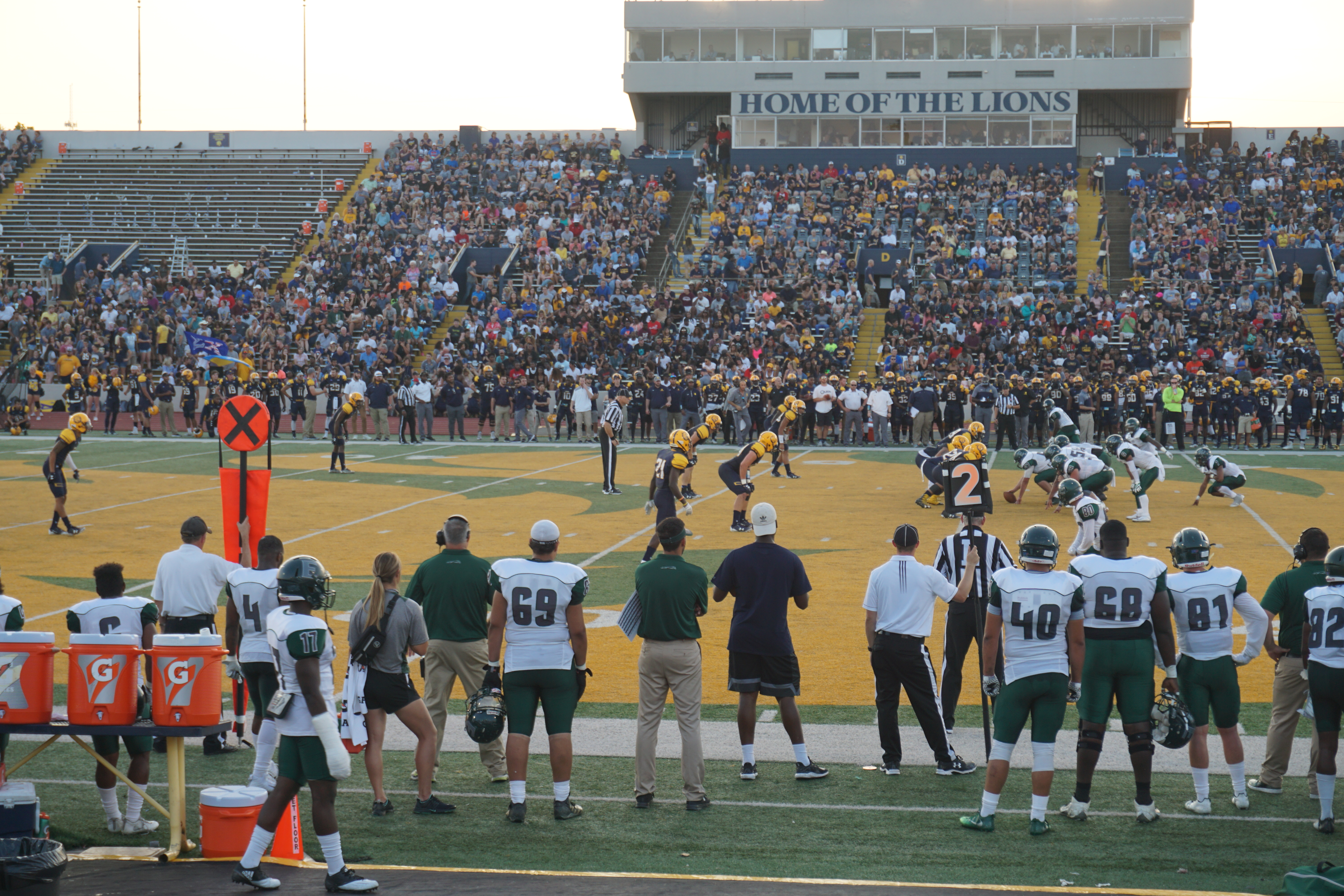
Football game

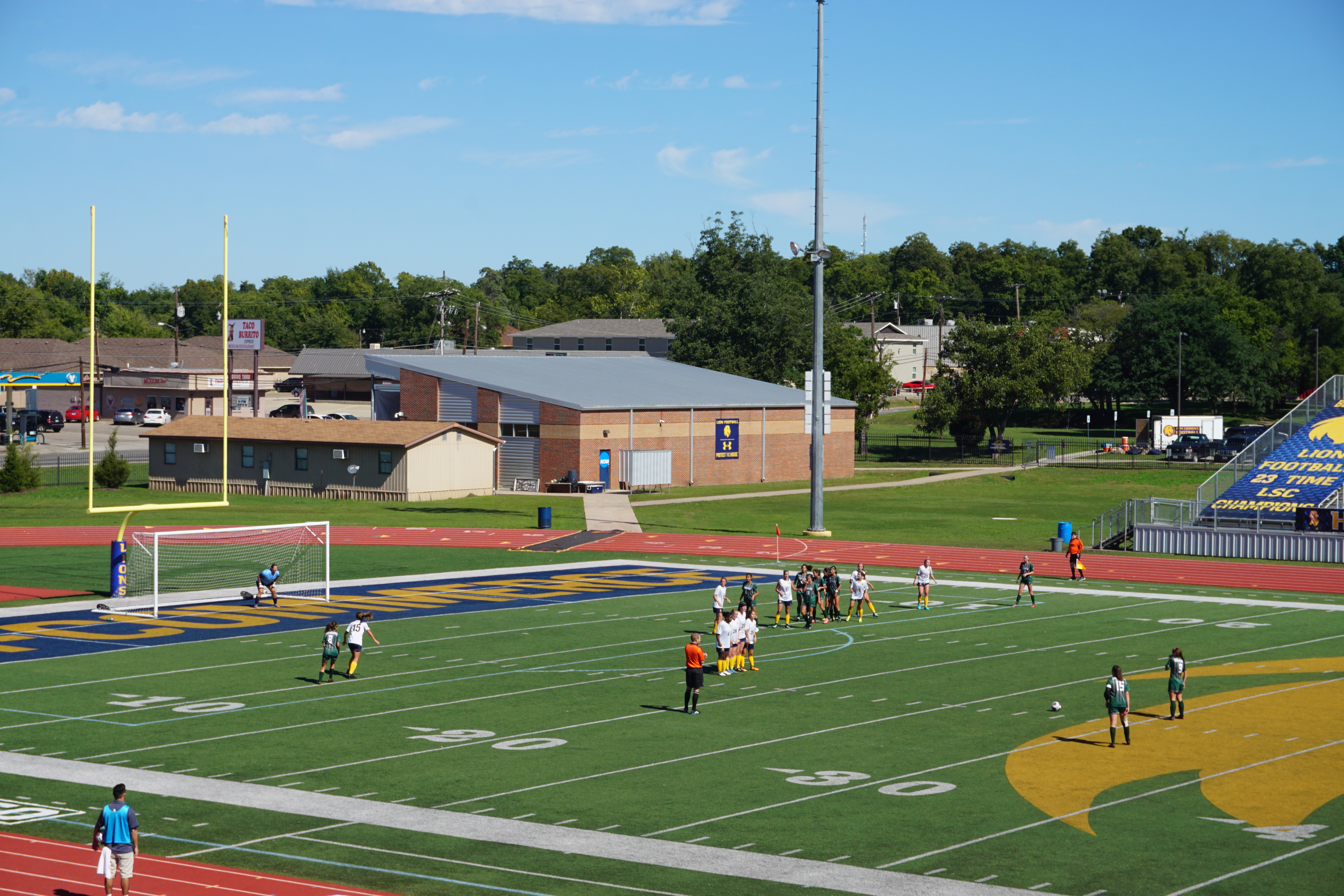
Women's soccer match

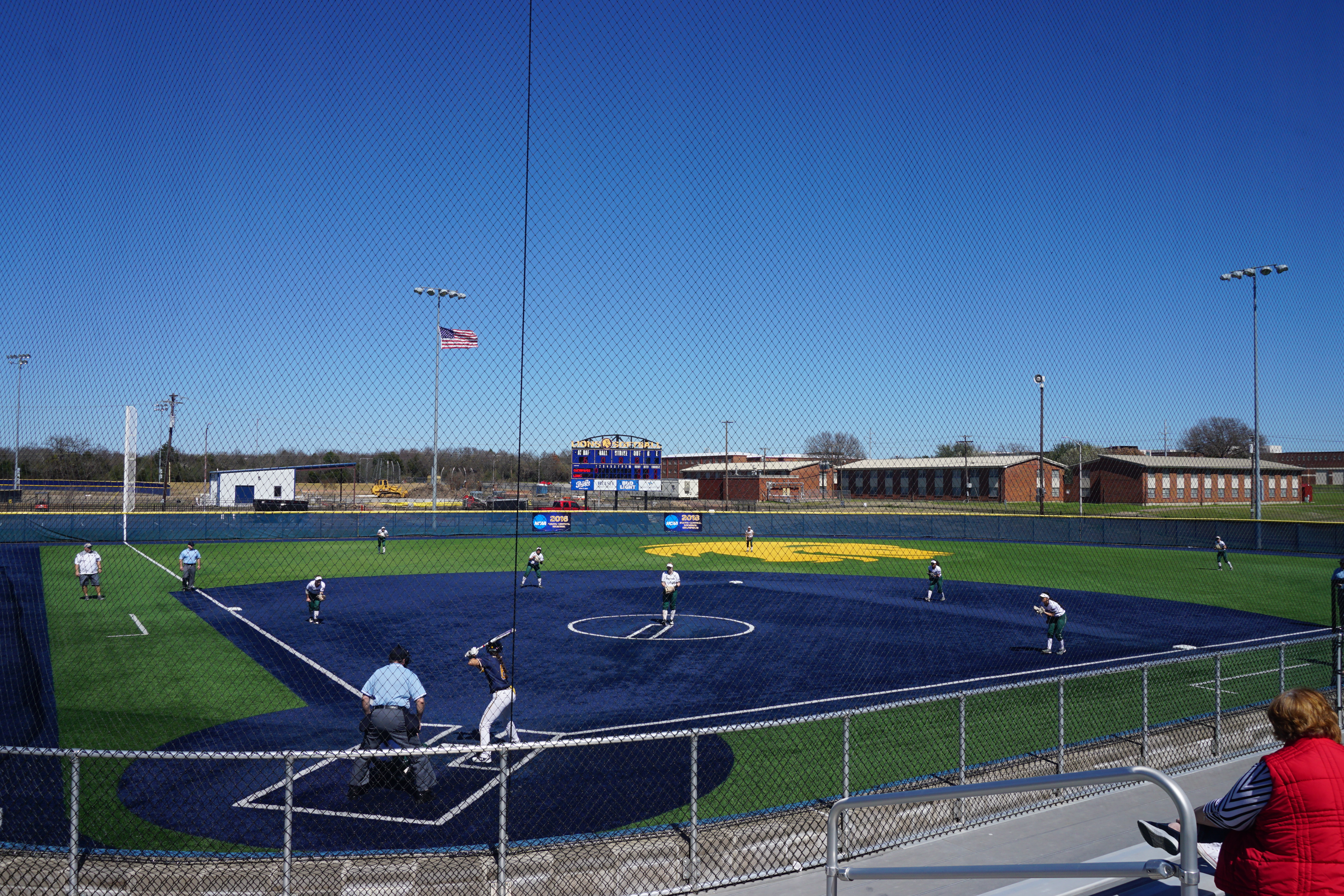
Softball game

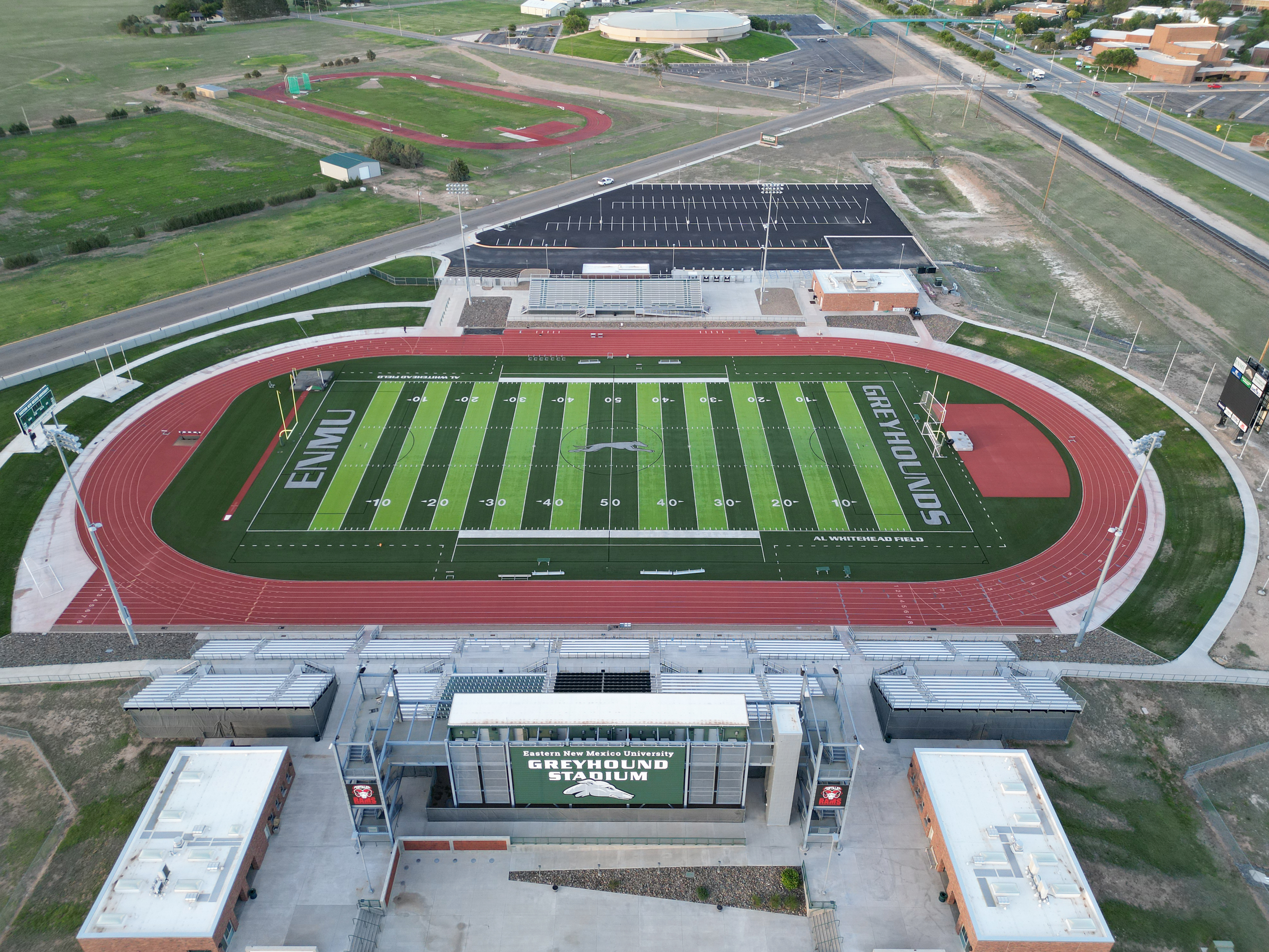
Greyhound Stadium
