= NAIA women's cross country championship =

- Sport: Cross country running
- Founded: 1980
- No. of teams: 35
- Country: United States
- Most recent champion: Taylor (2)
- Website: NAIA.com

The NAIA Women's cross country championship is the annual cross country meet to determine the national champions of NAIA women's cross country running in the United States and Canada. It has been held annually since 1980 (two years before the NCAA began to sponsor women's sports).

A team and individual championship are contested each year.

The most successful program are Simon Fraser, who have won 10 national titles.

The current champions are Taylor, who won their second title in 2025.

The race distance for the women's competition was increased to 6000 meters (3.73 miles) in 2023. All previous championships had been contested over 5000 meters (3.11 miles).

== Results ==
NAIA women's cross country championship
Year	Site	Championship results				Individual champion(s)	
Year	Site	Winner	Points	Runners-up	Points	Winner (team)	Time
1980	Salina, KS	Wisconsin–Parkside	52	Emporia State	100	Wendy Burman (Wisconsin–Parkside)	17:54
1981	Kenosha, WI	Adams State	25	Berry	71	Mary Jaqua (Adams State)	18:34
1982	Kenosha, WI	Marquette	48	Wisconsin–Eau Claire	109	Kate Webb (Marquette)	17:41
1983	Kenosha, WI	Simon Fraser	58	Marquette	79	Cindy Grant (Simon Fraser)	17:32
1984	Kenosha, WI	Wisconsin–Eau Claire	91	Portland	99	Katie Somers (Wisconsin–Eau Claire)	17:36
1985	Kenosha, WI	Portland	64	Wisconsin–Eau Claire	95	Val Hilden (Pacific Lutheran)	18:53
1986	Kenosha, WI	Wisconsin–Parkside	121	Emporia State	151	Gina Van Laar (Hillsdale)	17:40
1987	Kenosha, WI	Simon Fraser	60	Adams State	169	Leah Pells (Simon Fraser)	16:59
1988	Kenosha, WI	Pacific Lutheran	44	Adams State	69	Valerie Hilden (Pacific Lutheran)	17:41
1989	Kenosha, WI	Adams State	79	Western State	132	Wanda Howlett (Puget Sound)	17:55
1990	Kenosha, WI	Western State	58	Adams State	70	Sarah Howell (Simon Fraser)	17:44
1991	Kenosha, WI	Adams State	66	Simon Fraser	87	Amy Giblin (Adams State)	17:37
1992	Kenosha, WI	Puget Sound	76	George Fox	111	Aundrea Bertoia (Simon Fraser)	18:44
1993	Kenosha, WI	Puget Sound	38	Doane; Simon Fraser	169	Elizabeth Onyambu (Biola)	17:35
1994	Kenosha, WI	Puget Sound	51	Simon Fraser	74	Cari Rampersad (Simon Fraser)	17:51
1995	Kenosha, WI	Puget Sound	82	Simon Fraser	91	Cari Rampersad (Simon Fraser)	18:02
1996	Kenosha, WI	Simon Fraser	75	Puget Sound	114	Cari Rampersad (Simon Fraser)	17:14
1997	Kenosha, WI	Simon Fraser	56	Puget Sound	118	Heather deGeest (Simon Fraser)	18:33
1998	Kenosha, WI	Simon Fraser	22	Malone	146	Heather deGeest (Simon Fraser)	17:06
1999	Kenosha, WI	Malone	77	Spring Arbor	160	Melissa Clement (Simon Fraser)	17:39
2000	Kenosha, WI	Concordia (CA)	133	Concordia (NE)	188	Everlyne Lagat (Malone)	18:01
2001	Kenosha, WI	Cedarville	147	Concordia (NE)	169	Emile Mondo (Simon Fraser)	17:24
2002	Kenosha, WI	Northwest (WA)	77	Concordia (NE)	116	Emile Mondo (Simon Fraser)	16:43
2003	Louisville, KY	Simon Fraser	93	Northwest (WA)	114	Mirriam Kaumba (Oklahoma Baptist)	17:13.9
2004	Louisville, KY	Simon Fraser	95	Concordia (NE)	129	Mirriam Kaumba (Oklahoma Baptist)	16:53.7
2005	Louisville, KY	Simon Fraser	74	Black Hills State	190	Julia Howard (Simon Fraser)	17:24.15
2006	Louisville, KY	Simon Fraser	73	Cedarville	92	Genevieve Binsfeld (Minot State)	17:38.2
2007	Kenosha, WI	Simon Fraser	99	Cedarville	145	Jaime Canterbury (Azusa Pacific)	17:10.8
2008	Kenosha, WI	Azusa Pacific	66	Cedarville	97	Alissa McKaig (Indiana Tech)	16:41.4
2009	Fort Vancouver, WA	Cal State San Marcos	137	Biola	140	Justyna Mudy (Shorter)	17:30
2010	Fort Vancouver, WA	Cal State San Marcos	88	Biola	127	Justyna Mudy (Shorter)	17:42
2011	Fort Vancouver, WA	Cal State San Marcos	82	Azusa Pacific	91	Obsie Birru (Grand View)	17:15
2012	Fort Vancouver, WA	British Columbia	98	College of Idaho	112	Hillary Holt (College of Idaho)	17:00
2013	Lawrence, KS	British Columbia	56	College of Idaho	97	Hillary Holt (College of Idaho)	16:48.13
2014	Lawrence, KS	British Columbia	53	Lewis-Clark State	96	Maria Bernard (British Columbia)	17:03.8
2015	Charlotte, NC	Northwest Christian	98	British Columbia	118	Kellian Hunt (Biola)	17:16.7
2016	Elsah, IL	British Columbia	90	Northwest Christian	135	Aminat Olowora (Oklahoma City)	16.24.28
2017	Fort Vancouver, WA	British Columbia	109	Wayland Baptist	125	Aminat Olowora (Oklahoma City)	16:50
2018	Cedar Rapids, IA	Oregon Tech	125	Madonna	132	Anna Shields (Point Park)	17:15
2019	Fort Vancouver, WA	Madonna	111	College of Idaho	147	Hannah Stoffel (Huntington–IN)	17:18
2020	Cedar Rapids, IA	St. Francis (IL)	111	College of Idaho	146	Emma Wilson (Huntington–IN)	17:02.86
2021	Fort Vancouver, WA	Milligan	122	St. Francis (IL)	141	Alyssa Bearzi (Milligan)	18:14.9
2022	Tallahassee, FL	Taylor	50	Milligan	177	Lina May (William Carey)	16:50.9
Race distance changes from 5,000 meters to 6,000 meters
2023	Fort Vancouver, WA	College of Idaho	68	The Master's	92	Addy Wiley (Huntington–IN)	21:04.2
2024	Columbia, MO	The Master's	92	Taylor	93	Jaynie Halterman (Taylor)	20:24.7
2025	Tallahassee, FL	Taylor	90	Milligan	109	Jaynie Halterman (Taylor)	20:13.2
2026	Fort Vancouver, WA						
2027	Columbia, MO						

== Champions ==
=== Team titles ===
==== Active NAIA programs ====
School	Titles	Years
British Columbia	5	2012, 2013, 2014, 2016, 2017
Taylor	2	2022, 2025
The Master's	1	2024
College of Idaho	1	2023
Milligan	1	2021
St. Francis (IL)	1	2020
Madonna	1	2019
Oregon Tech	1	2018
Northwest Christian	1	2015
Northwest (WA)	1	2002

==== Former NAIA programs ====
School	Titles	Years
Simon Fraser	10	1983, 1987, 1996, 1997, 1998, 2003, 2004, 2005, 2006, 2007
Puget Sound	4	1992, 1993, 1994, 1995
Adams State	3	1981, 1989, 1991
Cal State San Marcos	3	2009, 2010, 2011
Wisconsin–Parkside	2	1980, 1986
Azusa Pacific	1	2008
Cedarville	1	2001
Concordia Irvine	1	2000
Malone	1	1999
Western Colorado	1	1990
Pacific Lutheran	1	1988
Portland	1	1985
Wisconsin–Eau Claire	1	1984
Marquette	1	1982

== See also ==
- NAIA men's cross country championship
- NCAA women's cross country championships (Division I, Division II, Division III)
- NCAA Men's cross country championships (Division I, Division II, Division III)
