= 2022 NAIA cross country championships =

- Edition: 67th men, 43rd women
- Date: November 18, 2022 8:30 AM EST
- Host city: Tallahassee, Florida
- Venue: Apalachee Regional Park
- Distances: 8 km men, 5 km women

The 2022 NAIA cross country championships was the 67th annual NAIA men's cross country championship and 43rd annual NAIA women's cross country championship to determine the team and individual national champions of NAIA men's and women's collegiate cross country running in the United States.

These championships were hosted by Apalachee Regional Park in Tallahassee, Florida.

The Dordt men won their first national title and Abraham Chelangam became the third consecutive individual champion for Oklahoma City University.

The women of Taylor won their first national championship and Lina May became the first individual champion for William Carey University.

== Television ==
The NAIA Network streamed the race.

== Men's team result (top 10) ==
| PL | Team | Score | 1 | 2 | 3 | 4 | 5 | (6) | (7) |
|---|---|---|---|---|---|---|---|---|---|
| 1st place, gold medalist(s) | Dordt | 97 | 11 | 14 | 15 | 19 | 38 | (42) | (117) |
| 2nd place, silver medalist(s) | Milligan | 115 | 4 | 8 | 16 | 31 | 56 | (58) | (69) |
| 3rd place, bronze medalist(s) | The Master's | 151 | 7 | 9 | 33 | 34 | 68 | (122) | (194) |
| 4 | Indiana Wesleyan | 208 | 12 | 17 | 39 | 48 | 92 | (99) | (162) |
| 5 | St. Francis (Ill) | 208 | 18 | 26 | 28 | 60 | 76 | (78) | (150) |
| 6 | Oklahoma City | 218 | 1 | 2 | 70 | 71 | 74 | (81) | (112) |
| 7 | College of Idaho | 227 | 21 | 41 | 49 | 57 | 59 | (132) | (236) |
| 8 | Grace | 247 | 5 | 36 | 45 | 61 | 100 | (152) | (195) |
| 9 | Southern Oregon | 278 | 24 | 44 | 52 | 64 | 94 | (119) | (161) |
| 10 | Huntington | 283 | 3 | 22 | 37 | 63 | 158 | (215) | (230) |

== Men's individual result (top 10) ==
| Position | Name | Team | Time |
|---|---|---|---|
| 1st place, gold medalist(s) | Abraham Chelangam | Oklahoma City | 23:41.9 |
| 2nd place, silver medalist(s) | Shimales Abebe | Oklahoma City | 24:03.9 |
| 3rd place, bronze medalist(s) | Haile Stutzman | Huntington | 24:05.0 |
| 4 | Aaron Jones | Milligan | 24:05.3 |
| 5 | Bryan Hernandez-Rios | Grace | 24:05.6 |
| 6 | Luke Pohl | Cornerstone | 24:05.8 |
| 7 | Vincent Nchogu | TAMU-Texarkana | 24:12.3 |
| 8 | Davis Boggess | The Master's | 24:17.1 |
| 9 | Will Stockley | Milligan | 24:19.5 |
| 10 | Brint Laubach | The Master's | 24:20.4 |

== Women's team result (top 10) ==
| PL | Team | Score | 1 | 2 | 3 | 4 | 5 | (6) | (7) |
|---|---|---|---|---|---|---|---|---|---|
| 1st place, gold medalist(s) | Taylor | 50 | 4 | 6 | 9 | 12 | 19 | (31) | (32) |
| 2nd place, silver medalist(s) | Milligan | 177 | 7 | 13 | 17 | 66 | 74 | (86) | (181) |
| 3rd place, bronze medalist(s) | College of Idaho | 201 | 23 | 25 | 27 | 42 | 84 | (128) | (132) |
| 4 | St. Francis (Ill) | 203 | 10 | 14 | 46 | 63 | 70 | (99) | (182) |
| 5 | Cornerstone | 211 | 11 | 24 | 29 | 57 | 90 | (96) | (98) |
| 6 | The Master's | 230 | 26 | 28 | 37 | 56 | 83 | (94) | (107) |
| 7 | St. Mary (Kan) | 251 | 15 | 22 | 45 | 65 | 104 | (143) | (168) |
| 8 | Dordt | 315 | 8 | 52 | 61 | 79 | 115 | (131) | (169) |
| 9 | Southern Oregon | 357 | 49 | 69 | 75 | 76 | 88 | (117) | (118) |
| 10 | Grace | 363 | 16 | 21 | 91 | 101 | 134 | (159) | (173) |

== Women's individual result (top 10) ==
| Position | Name | Team | Time |
|---|---|---|---|
| 1st place, gold medalist(s) | Lina May | William Carey | 16:50.9 |
| 2nd place, silver medalist(s) | Addy Wiley | Huntington | 16:58.9 |
| 3rd place, bronze medalist(s) | Sydney Little Light | Rocky Mountain | 17:25.6 |
| 4 | Abbey Brennan | Taylor | 17:28.3 |
| 5 | Alex Ebetino | St. Francis (Ind) | 17:29.2 |
| 6 | Lisa Voyles | Indiana Tech | 17:30.5 |
| 7 | Noel VanderWall | Taylor | 17:33.3 |
| 8 | Ellen-Mary Kearney | Milligan | 17:33.5 |
| 9 | Jessica Kampman | Dordt | 17:34.7 |
| 10 | Ahna Vanderwall | Taylor | 17:35.9 |

== See also ==
- NAIA men's cross country championships
- NAIA women's cross country championships
- NCAA Division I men's cross country championships
- NCAA Division I women's cross country championships
- NCAA Division II men's cross country championships
- NCAA Division II women's cross country championships
- NCAA Division III men's cross country championships
- NCAA Division III women's cross country championships

== Results ==
- https://live.pttiming.com/XC-PTT.html?mid=5226
