= 2023 NAIA cross country championships =

National athletics championship event

- Edition: 68th men, 44th women
- Date: November 17, 2023 10:30 AM PST
- Host city: (Washington (state)) Vancouver, Washington
- Venue: Fort Vancouver Historical Park
- Distances: 8 km men, 6 km women

The 2023 NAIA cross country championships was the 68th annual NAIA men's and 44th annual NAIA women's to determine the team and individual national champions of NAIA men's and women's collegiate cross country running in the United States.

These championships were hosted by the Cascade Collegiate Conference in Vancouver, Washington.

The race distance for the women's competition was increased to 6000 meters (3.73 miles). All previous championships had been contested over 5000 meters (3.11 miles).

The Milligan men won their second national title in the past three seasons and Jackson Wilson became the first individual champion for Rocky Mountain.

College of Idaho won their first women's national championship and Addy Wiley became the third Huntington runner in the past five years to win the individual championship. The championship was Wiley's last NAIA race before signing a professional contract. It was also Wiley's only cross country race of the season.

== Men's team result (top 15) ==
PL	Team	Score	1	2	3	4	5	(6)	(7)
1st place, gold medalist(s)	Milligan (TN)	93	5	6	8	28	46	(68)	(84)
2nd place, silver medalist(s)	Saint Mary (KS)	98	2	17	23	24	32	(77)	(145)
3rd place, bronze medalist(s)	Cumberlands (KY)	114	4	14	25	34	37	(72)	(108)
4	The Master's (CA)	156	7	11	27	55	56	(89)_	(150)
5	Indiana Wesleyan	206	12	36	43	44	71	(98)	(122)
6	College of Idaho	280	10	16	61	82	111	(113)	(132)
7	Eastern Oregon	283	18	54	58	75	78	(79)	(146)
8	Dordt (IA)	298	19	38	48	93	100	(130)	(195)
9	Taylor (IN)	300	30	50	59	76	85	(107)	(109)
10	Montreat (NC)	320	15	39	62	73	131	(169)	(178)
11	Oklahoma City	358	57	67	70	81	83	(87)	(123)
12	Shawnee State (OH)	382	13	26	80	127	136	(162)	(173)
13	Grace (IN)	418	45	53	69	117	134	(155)	(175)
14	Kansas Wesleyan	436	35	41	99	120	141	(159)	(196)
15	Doane (NE)	458	20	33	121	133	151	(199)	(201)

== Men's individual result (top 15) ==
Position	Name	Team	Time
1st place, gold medalist(s)	Jackson Wilson	Rocky Mountain (MT)	24:31.8
2nd place, silver medalist(s)	Joseph Skoog	Bethel (TN)	24:40.9
3rd place, bronze medalist(s)	Emad Bashir-Mohammed	Saint Mary (KS)	24:49.1
4	Robert Swoboda	Corban (OR)	24:50.3
5	Serhii Shevchenko	Cumberlands (KY)	24:55.7
6	Bryn Woodall	Milligan (TN)	24:56.9
7	Aaron Jones	Milligan (TN)	24:58.5
8	Jack Anderson	The Master's (CA)	25:02.0
9	Will Stockley	Milligan (TN)	25:03.9
10	Demetris Love, Jr.	Embry-Riddle (AZ)	25:05.4
11	Daniel Butler	College of Idaho	25:09.0
12	Daniel Rush	The Master's (CA)	25:09.6
13	Landon Wakeman	Indiana Wesleyan	25:13.1
14	Aiden Kammler	Shawnee State (OH)	25:13.4
15	Isaac Kiprop	Campbellsville (KY)	25:14.4

== Women's team result (top 15) ==
PL	Team	Score	1	2	3	4	5	(6)	(7)
1st place, gold medalist(s)	College of Idaho	68	2	3	5	7	51	(92)	(103)
2nd place, silver medalist(s)	The Master's (CA)	92	10	13	16	21	32	(64)	(135)
3rd place, bronze medalist(s)	Saint Mary (KS)	133	6	20	22	26	59	(78)	(82)
4	Milligan (TN)	145	14	18	19	33	61	(70)	(98)
5	Taylor (IN)	184	4	25	34	54	67	(72)	(136)
6	Huntington (IN)	201	1	11	47	69	73	(166)	(170)
7	Saint Francis (IL)	282	36	52	58	65	71	(154)	(204)
8	Southern Oregon	317	27	30	63	81	116	(122)	(218)
9	Cumberlands (KY)	321	9	24	79	86	123	(148)	(173)
10	Dordt (IA)	332	8	55	76	87	106	(131)	(132)
11	Lewis-Clark State (ID)	352	31	37	62	88	134	(142)	(164)
12	Embry-Riddle (AZ)	362	40	43	68	104	107	(138)	(139)
13	Grace (IN)	433	29	89	94	100	121	(128)	(227)
14	Indiana Wesleyan	434	41	48	105	115	125	(157)	(165)
15	Goshen (IN)	439	28	75	77	129	130	(147)	(167)

== Women's individual result (top 15) ==
Position	Name	Team	Time
1st place, gold medalist(s)	Addy Wiley	Huntington (IN)	21:04.2
2nd place, silver medalist(s)	Ellyse Tingelstad	College of Idaho	21:16.1
3rd place, bronze medalist(s)	Sage Martin	College of Idaho	21:39.4
4	Mollie Gamble	Taylor (IN)	21:40.2
5	Abbey Shirts	College of Idaho	21:41.9
6	Reagan Hiebert	Saint Mary (KS)	21:44.4
7	Kahea Figueira	College of Idaho	21:46.5
8	Jessica Kampman	Dordt (IA)	21:48.5
9	Alina Boshchuk	Cumberlands (KY)	21:50.8
10	Hannah Fredericks	The Master's (CA)	21:52.5
11	Anna Martin	Huntington (IN)	21:57.6
12	Haley Nieuwkoop	Cornerstone (MI)	22:00.4
13	Suzie Johnson	The Master's (CA)	22:01.5
14	Caitlin Dominy	Milligan (TN)	22:03.5
15	Alauna Carstens	Evergreen State (WA)	22:05.5

== See also ==
- NAIA men's cross country championships
- NAIA women's cross country championships
- NCAA Division I men's cross country championships
- NCAA Division I women's cross country championships
- NCAA Division II men's cross country championships
- NCAA Division II women's cross country championships
- NCAA Division III men's cross country championships
- NCAA Division III women's cross country championships
