= 2022 USATF U20 Outdoor Championships =

2022 USA Track & Field Outdoor Championships
- Dates: June 23–25
- Host city: Eugene, Oregon, U.S.
- Venue: Hayward Field, Oregon University
- Level: Junior
- Type: Outdoor
- Events: 40 (men: 20; women: 20)

The 2022 USATF U20 Outdoor Championships was the 49th edition of the annual national championship in outdoor track and field for American athletes aged under 20, organized by USA Track & Field. The three-day competition took place on June 23–25 in at Hayward Field in Eugene, Oregon.

== Qualification ==
To enter an event at the national competition, athletes must achieve the event's entry standard performance. The qualifying period for performances runs from June 9, 2021, to June 12, 2022, for all events, except race walk. The race walk qualifying window opened on April 11, 2021.

== Results ==
Results

=== Men's track ===
Event	Gold		Silver		Bronze	
100 meters	Laurenz Colbert	10.21	Michael Gizzi	10.28	Connor Washington	10.29
200 meters	Jordan Anthony	20.35	Brandon Miller	20.47	Laurenz Colbert	20.48
400 meters	Steven McElroy	44.93	Ashton Schwartzman	45.16	Charlie Bartholomew	45.40
800 meters	Miles Brown	1:50.90	Samuel Rodman	1:50.91	Daniel Watck	1:51.20
1500 meters	Nathan Green	3:45.19	Muluken Tewalt	3:47.62	Jack Dingman	3:48.75
5000 meters	Tyrone Gorze	14:08.08	Dylan Throop	14:09.22	Jacob Bourget	14:09.74
10,000 meters	Lucas Guerra	8:19.36	Tyrone Gorze	8:21.03	James Wischusen	8:23.32
110 m hurdles	Malik Mixon	13.28	TJ Caldwell	13.34	Jayden Smith	13.35
400 m hurdles	Kody Blackwood	50.62	Yan Vazquez	50.95	Grant Williams	51.02
3000 m steeplechase	Bryce Lentz	8:58.46	Peter Visser	9:02.07	Logan Patete	9:13.54
10 kilometers walk	Ryan Allen	49:53.14	Clayton Stoil	54:15.71	Lucien Beardsley	1:00:02.84

Men's field

Event	Gold		Silver		Bronze	
High jump	Marcus Monroe	2.12m	Aaron Kim	2.09m	Jalan River	2.09m
Pole vault	Justin Rogers	5.25m	Garrett Brown	5.15m	Hunter O'Brien	5.05m
Long jump	Johnny Brackins	8.03m	Curtis Williams	7.73m	Aaron Davis	7.64m
Triple jump	Solomon Washington	15.48m	Floyd Whitaker	15.35m	Jaden Trimble Patterson	14.66m
Shot put	Tarik Robinson-O'Hagan	19.62m	Cade Moran	19.15m	Cooper Mack	18.70m
Discus throw	Desmond Coleman	60.10m	Kevin Grubbs	60.02m	Ridge Estes	60.00m
Hammer throw	Tarik O'Hagan	75.08m	Collin Burkhart	72.58m	Jeremiah Nubbe	70.79m
Javelin throw	Evan Niedrowski	70.58m	Jackson Rimes	61.81m	Elijah Cook	59.41m
Decathlon	Landon Helms	6425	Bryce Pearson	6280	Max Tucker	6010

=== Women's track ===
Event	Gold		Silver		Bronze	
100 meters	Shawnti Jackson	11.07	Mia Brahe-Pedersen	11.09	Autumn Wilson	11.14
200 meters	Jayla Jamsion	22.93	Mia Brahe-Pedersen	22.98	Iyana Gray	23.20
400 meters	Mekenze Kelley	52.10	Zaya Akins	52.90	Kaylyn Brown	53.11
800 meters	Juliette Whittaker	1:59.04	Roisin Willis	2:00.32	Michaela Rose	2:06.71
1500 meters	Addison Wiley	4:15.53	Mia Barnett	4:20.86	Elizabeth Whaley	4:23.00
3000 meters	Kate Peters	9:34.78	Analee Weaver	9:41.65	Heidi Nielson	9:52.98
5000 meters	Analee Weaver	16:25.67	Heidi Nielson	16:30.50	Harper McClain	16:48.23
100 m hurdles	Jalaysiya Smith	13.21	Eddiyah Frye	13.26	Chyler Turner	13.36
400 m hurdles	Akala Garrett	57.47	Michaela Rose	58.30	Myla Greene	58.61
3000 m steeplechase	Harper McClain	10:23.35	Karrilynn Baloga	10:27.13	Addison Stevenson	10:58.64
10 kilometers walk	Valeriia Sholomistska*	46:46.97	Angelica Harris	49:29.73	Talia Green	49:31.54

*Valeriia Sholomistska was competing as a guest from Ukraine.

Women's field

Event	Gold		Silver		Bronze	
High jump	Miracle Ailes	1.81m	Emma Gates	1.81m	Cheyla Scott	1.81m
Pole vault	Amanda Moll	4.35m	Hana Moll	4.35m	Olivia Lueking	4.30m
Long jump	India Alix	6.17m	Sophia Beckmon	6.11m	Alyssa Banales	6.00m
Triple jump	Suzan Ogunleye	13.09m	Agur Dwol	12.74m	Riley Ammenhauser	12.60m
Shot put	Amelia Flynt	15.55m	Chrystal Herpin	15.52m	Sarah Marvin	14.76m
Discus throw	Siniru Iheoma	54.47m	Ames Burton	54.08m	Giavonna Meeks	52.87m
Hammer throw	Emily Fink	59.94m	Jillian Stafford	59.52m	Kali Terza	58.14m
Javelin throw	Kohana Nakato	48.11m	Saydi Orange	47.65m	Marin Barras	46.88m
Heptathlon	Blakelee Winn	5473	JaiCieonna Gero-Holt	5401	Bryanna Craig	5388

== World U20 team selection ==
The event served as the selection meet for the United States team for the 2022 World Athletics U20 Championships. In order to be entered, athletes needed to finish in the first two of their event at the national meet and also achieve an international qualifying standard mark. The United States team, as managed by USATF, can also bring a qualified back up athlete in case one of the team members is unable to perform.
