= NAIA men's cross country championship =

- Sport: Cross country running
- Founded: 1956
- Country: United States
- Most recent champion: Indiana Wesleyan (1)
- Website: NAIA.com

The NAIA men's cross country championship is the annual cross country meet to determine the national champions of NAIA men's cross country running. It has been held annually since 1956. A team and individual championship are contested each year.

The most successful program has been Adams State, with 12 national titles. Oklahoma City has the most titles (5) of active NAIA programs.

The current champions are the Indiana Wesleyan, who won their first national title in 2025.

== Results ==
NAIA men's cross country championship
| Year | Site | Championship results | | | | Individual champion(s) | |
| Year | Site | Winner | Points | Runners-up | Points | Winner (team) | Time |
|---|---|---|---|---|---|---|---|
| 1956 | Omaha, NE | South Dakota State | 71 | Kansas Teachers–Hays | 68 | Ray Mation (Redlands) | 22:42.3 |
| 1957 | Omaha, NE | Howard Payne | 45 | South Dakota State | 64 | Don Brooksiek (South Dakota State) | 21:00.8 |
| 1958 | Omaha, NE | Kansas Teachers | 67 | South Dakota State | 73 | Ed Vander Heauval (Central Michigan) | 20:55.6 |
| 1959 | Omaha, NE | Kansas Teachers | 62 | Nebraska Teachers | 66 | Tom O’Riordan (Idaho State) | 20:55.6 |
| 1960 | Omaha, NE | Southern Illinois | 37 | Graceland | 100 | Joe Thomas (Southern Illinois) | 20:39.0 |
| 1961 | Omaha, NE | Kansas Teachers | 73 | Kansas Teachers–Hays | 75 | Jim Keefe (Central Conn. State) | 21:18.5 |
| 1962 | Omaha, NE | Kansas Teachers | 50 | Kansas Teachers–Hays | 95 | Ireland Sloan (Kansas Teachers) | 20:22.7 |
| 1963 | Omaha, NE | Kansas Teachers–Hays | 53 | Kansas Teachers | 69 | John Camien (Kansas Teachers) | 20:23.7 |
| 1964 | Omaha, NE | Howard Payne | 29 | Kansas Teachers–Hays | 69 | John Camien (Kansas Teachers) | 20:25.8 |
| 1965 | Omaha, NE | Kansas Teachers–Hays | 42 | Whitworth | 117 | Pat McMahon (Oklahoma Baptist) | 20:28.3 |
| 1966 | Omaha, NE | Eastern Michigan | 126 | Howard Payne | 155 | Pat McMahon (Oklahoma Baptist) | 19:53.6 |
| 1967 | Omaha, NE | Eastern Michigan | 85 | St. Cloud State | 88 | John Mason (Kansas Teachers–Hays) | 20:14.0 |
| 1968 | Oklahoma City, OK | Kansas Teachers–Hays | 106 | Kansas Teachers | 110 | John Mason (Kansas Teachers–Hays) | 23:40.0 |
| 1969 | Oklahoma City, OK | Kansas Teachers–Hays | 102 | Eastern Michigan | 111 | Ralph Foote (Taylor) | 24:53.0 |
| 1970 | Liberty, MO | Eastern Michigan | 86 | Kansas Teachers–Hays | 136 | Rex Maddaford (Eastern New Mexico) | 25:29.4 |
| 1971 | Liberty, MO | Adams State | 196 | Eastern New Mexico | 210 | David Antognoli (Edinboro State) | 25:40.2 |
| 1972 | Liberty, MO | Malone | 92 | Occidental | 169 | Mike Nixon (Kansas State Pittsburg) | 24:29.4 |
| 1973 | Salina, KS | Eastern New Mexico | 35 | Malone | 99 | Tony Brien (Marymount) | 23:42.5 |
| 1974 | Salina, KS | Eastern New Mexico | 28 | U.S. International | 166 | Mike Boit (Eastern New Mexico) | 23:45.0 |
| 1975 | Salina, KS | Edinboro State | 97 | Eastern New Mexico | 144 | Mike Boit (Eastern New Mexico) | 24:23.0 |
| 1976 | Kenosha, WI | Edinboro State | 56 | Adams State | 103 | John Kebiro (Eastern New Mexico) | 24:21.0 |
| 1977 | Kenosha, WI | Adams State | 102 | Saginaw Valley State | 133 | Garry Henry (Pembroke State) | 24:11.0 |
| 1978 | Kenosha, WI | Pembroke State | 126 | Saginaw Valley State | 147 | Kelly Jensen (Southern Oregon) | 25:07.0 |
| 1979 | Kenosha, WI | Adams State | 63 | Wisconsin–La Crosse | 123 | Sam Montoya (Adams State) | 24:53.0 |
| 1980 | Salina, KS | Adams State | 48 | Malone | 78 | Pat Porter (Adams State) | 24:28.5 |
| 1981 | Kenosha, WI | Adams State | 76 | Wisconsin–La Crosse | 109 | Pat Porter (Adams State) | 24:55.0 |
| 1982 | Kenosha, WI | Simon Fraser | 49 | Saginaw Valley State | 167 | Steve Delano (Southwestern–KS) | 25:01.0 |
| 1983 | Kenosha, WI | Adams State | 47 | Wisconsin–La Crosse | 95 | Steve Delano (Southwestern–KS) | 24:44.0 |
| 1984 | Kenosha, WI | Adams State | 31 | Wisconsin–La Crosse | 97 | Mike Maraun (Simon Fraser) | 24:39.0 |
| 1985 | Kenosha, WI | Adams State | 26 | Wisconsin–La Crosse | 105 | Robbie Hipwood (Adams State) | 25:49.0 |
| 1986 | Kenosha, WI | Adams State | 78 | Western State | 78 | Rick Robirds (Adams State) | 24:10.0 |
| 1987 | Kenosha, WI | Adams State | 21 | New Mexico Highlands | 171 | Rick Robirds (Adams State) | 23:47.0 |
| 1988 | Kenosha, WI | Adams State | 51 | Western State | 88 | Craig Dickson (Adams State) | 24:18.0 |
| 1989 | Kenosha, WI | Adams State | 39 | Malone | 53 | Rick Robirds (Adams State) | 24:01.0 |
| 1990 | Kenosha, WI | Lubbock Christian | 33 | Adams State | 57 | James Bungei (Lubbock Christian) | 24:07.0 |
| 1991 | Kenosha, WI | Lubbock Christian | 26 | Adams State | 42 | James Bungei (Lubbock Christian) | 24:07.0 |
| 1992 | Kenosha, WI | Lubbock Christian | 33 | Hillsdale | 94 | James Bungei (Lubbock Christian) | 24:52.0 |
| 1993 | Kenosha, WI | Lubbock Christian | 24 | Simon Fraser | 61 | James Bungei (Lubbock Christian) | 23:37.0 |
| 1994 | Kenosha, WI | Lubbock Christian | 21 | Hillsdale | 120 | Simeon Sawe (Lubbock Christian) | 23:42.0 |
| 1995 | Kenosha, WI | Lubbock Christian | 17 | Life (GA) | 66 | Simeon Sawe (Lubbock Christian) | 24:22.0 |
| 1996 | Kenosha, WI | Lubbock Christian | 30 | Life (GA) | 79 | Silah Misoi (Life–GA) | 23:14.0 |
| 1997 | Kenosha, WI | Lubbock Christian | 40 | Life (GA) | 80 | Sammy Nyamong (Life–GA) | 25:53 |
| 1998 | Kenosha, WI | Life (GA) | 41 | Lindenwood | 81 | Silah Misoi (Life–GA) | 23:50.0 |
| 1999 | Kenosha, WI | Life (GA) | 25 | McKendree | 91 | Silah Misoi (Life–GA) | 23:31.0 |
| 2000 | Kenosha, WI | Life (GA) | 99 | Black Hills State | 137 | Alexis Sharangabo (Brevard) | 25:02 |
| 2001 | Kenosha, WI | Life (GA) | 84 | Malone | 118 | Daniel Kibungei (Malone) | 24:17 |
| 2002 | Kenosha, WI | Minot State | 120 | Eastern Oregon | 144 | Haregot Araya (McKendree) | 25:03 |
| 2003 | Louisville, KY | Minot State | 162 | Black Hills State | 152 | Jerry Ziak (British Columbia) | 24:22.6 |
| 2004 | Louisville, KY | Virginia Intermont | 54 | Aquinas (MI) | 175 | Soimo Kiplagat (Lindenwood) | 24:17.20 |
| 2005 | Louisville, KY | Virginia Intermont | 52 | Concordia (CA) | 122 | Soimo Kiplagat (Lindenwood) | 23:49.10 |
| 2006 | Louisville, KY | Virginia Intermont | 67 | Concordia (CA) | 136 | David Cheromei (Virginia Intermont) | 24:05.15 |
| 2007 | Kenosha, WI | Malone | 59 | Black Hills State | 202 | Aron Rono (Azusa Pacific) | 23:52.1 |
| 2008 | Kenosha, WI | Malone | 61 | Azusa Pacific | 118 | Aron Rono (Azusa Pacific) | 23:45.8 |
| 2009 | Fort Vancouver, WA | Malone | 44 | Concordia (NE) | 166 | Silas Kisorio (Oklahoma Christian) | 24:23 |
| 2010 | Fort Vancouver, WA | Southern Oregon | 105 | Wayland Baptist | 124 | Kennedy Kithuka (Wayland Baptist) | 24:02 |
| 2011 | Fort Vancouver, WA | Oklahoma Christian | 93 | Cal State San Marcos | 188 | Kennedy Kithuka (Wayland Baptist) | 23:15 |
| 2012 | Fort Vancouver, WA | St. Francis (IL) | 138 | Southern Oregon | 153 | John Gilbertson (Master's) | 23:56 |
| 2013 | Lawrence, KS | Oklahoma City | 77 | Southern Oregon | 124 | Eric Avila (Southern Oregon) | 24:02.45 |
| 2014 | Lawrence, KS | Oklahoma City | 55 | Southern Oregon | 121 | Benard Keter (Wayland Baptist) | 24:36.40 |
| 2015 | Charlotte, NC | Oklahoma City | 78 | Saint Mary | 168 | Geoffrey Kipchumba (William Carey) | 23:55.0 |
| 2016 | Elsah, IL | Southern Oregon | 122 | St. Francis (IL) | 148 | Jackson Thomas (Bacone) | 23.50.2 |
| 2017 | Fort Vancouver, WA | British Columbia | 41 | Columbia (MO) | 168 | Mark Shaw (Oklahoma City) | 24:09 |
| 2018 | Cedar Rapids, IA | Oklahoma City | 116 | Indiana Wesleyan | 143 | Colin De Young (Indiana Wesleyan) | 24:13 |
| 2019 | Fort Vancouver, WA | Oklahoma City | 110 | Taylor | 171 | Mark Shaw (Oklahoma City) | 24:39 |
| 2020 | Cedar Rapids, IA | Taylor | 73 | Huntington (IN) | 114 | Zouhair Talbi (Oklahoma City) | 23:45.15 |
| 2021 | Vancouver, WA | Milligan | 115 | Saint Mary | 175 | Zouhair Talbi (Oklahoma City) | 24:43.1 |
| 2022 | Tallahassee, FL | Dordt | 97 | Milligan | 115 | Abraham Chelangam (Oklahoma City) | 23:41.9 |
| 2023 | Fort Vancouver, WA | Milligan | 93 | Saint Mary | 98 | Jackson Wilson (Rocky Mountain) | 24:31.8 |
| 2024 | Columbia, MO | College of Idaho | 87 | Milligan | 96 | Evert Silva (Oklahoma City) | 23:14.0 |
| 2025 | Tallahassee, FL | Indiana Wesleyan | 117 | The Master's | 128 | Jack Anderson (The Master's) | 24:15.4 |
| 2026 | Fort Vancouver, WA | | | | | | |
| 2027 | Columbia, MO | | | | | | |

== Champions ==
=== Team titles ===
==== Active NAIA programs ====
| Team | Titles | Years |
|---|---|---|
| Oklahoma City | 5 | 2013, 2014, 2015, 2018, 2019 |
| Life | 4 | 1998, 1999, 2000, 2001 |
| Milligan | 2 | 2021, 2023 |
| Southern Oregon | 2 | 2010, 2016 |
| Indiana Wesleyan | 1 | 2025 |
| College of Idaho | 1 | 2024 |
| Dordt | 1 | 2022 |
| Taylor | 1 | 2020 |
| St. Francis (IL) | 1 | 2012 |

==== Former NAIA programs ====
| Team | Titles | Years |
|---|---|---|
| Adams State | 12 | 1971, 1977, 1979, 1980, 1981, 1983, 1984, 1985, 1986, 1987, 1988, 1989 |
| Lubbock Christian | 8 | 1990, 1991, 1992, 1993, 1994, 1995, 1996, 1997 |
| Emporia State (Kansas State Teachers) | 4 | 1958, 1959, 1961, 1962 |
| Fort Hays State (Kansas State–Hays) | 4 | 1958, 1959, 1961, 1962 |
| Malone | 4 | 1972, 2007, 2008, 2009 |
| Eastern Michigan | 3 | 1966, 1967, 1970 |
| Virginia Intermont | 3 | 2004, 2005, 2006 |
| Eastern New Mexico | 2 | 1973, 1974 |
| Edinboro (Edinboro State) | 2 | 1975, 1976 |
| Howard Payne | 2 | 1957, 1964 |
| Minot State | 2 | 2002, 2003 |
| Oklahoma Christian | 1 | 2011 |
| Simon Fraser | 1 | 1982 |
| UNC Pembroke (Pembroke State) | 1 | 1978 |
| Southern Illinois | 1 | 1960 |
| South Dakota State | 1 | 1956 |

== See also ==
- NAIA women's cross country championship
- NCAA men's cross country championships (Division I, Division II, Division III)
- NCAA women's cross country championships (Division I, Division II, Division III)
