= List of Eastern New Mexico Greyhounds head football coaches =

American football head coaches at Eastern New Mexico, US

There have been 18 head coaches in the history of the Eastern New Mexico Greyhounds football program.

== Tiny Reed ==
Reed held the position for the 1934 season. His coaching record at Eastern NMU was 7 wins, 0 losses, and 2 ties. This ranks him tenth at Eastern NMU in terms of total wins and first at Eastern NMU in terms of winning percentage.

== Jerry Dalrymple ==
Dalrymple held the position for the 1935 season. His overall coaching record at Eastern NMU was 7 wins, 4 losses, and 0 ties. This ranks him tenth at Eastern NMU in terms of total wins and second at Eastern NMU in terms of winning percentage.

== (in two spells) Al Garten ==
Garten held the position for fourteen seasons, from 1936 until 1937 and then returning from 1939 until 1953. His overall coaching record at Eastern NMU was 66 wins, 62 losses, and 4 ties. This ranks him second at Eastern NMU in terms of total wins and seventh at Eastern NMU in terms of winning percentage. The school did not field a football team from 1942 through 1944 because of World War II.

== R. P. Terrell ==
Terrell held the position for the 1938 season. His overall coaching record at Eastern NMU was 3 wins, 5 losses, and 2 ties. This ranks him 13th at Eastern NMU in terms of total wins and 11th at Eastern NMU in terms of winning percentage.

== Carl Richardson ==
Richardson held the position for ten seasons, from 1954 until 1963. His overall coaching record at Eastern NMU was 57 wins, 37 losses, and 3 ties. This ranks him third at Eastern NMU in terms of total wins and fifth at Eastern NMU in terms of winning percentage.

== B. B. Lees ==
Lees held the position for three seasons, from 1964 until 1966. His overall coaching record at Eastern NMU was 9 wins, 18 losses, and 1 ties. This ranks him eighth at Eastern NMU in terms of total wins and tenth at Eastern NMU in terms of winning percentage.

== Howard White ==
White held the position for three seasons, from 1967 until 1969. His overall coaching record at Eastern NMU was 8 wins, 20 losses, and 1 ties. This ranks him ninth at Eastern NMU in terms of total wins and 13th at Eastern NMU in terms of winning percentage.

== Jack Scott ==
Scott held the position for eight seasons, from 1970 until 1977. His overall coaching record at Eastern NMU was 40 wins, 41 losses, and 2 ties. This ranks him fifth at Eastern NMU in terms of total wins and eighth at Eastern NMU in terms of winning percentage.

== Dunny Goode ==
Dunny Goode held the position for five seasons, from 1978 until 1982. His coaching record at Eastern NMU was 21 wins, 29 losses, and 1 tie. This ranks him sixth in terms of total wins and ninth in terms of winning percentage.

== Bill Kelly ==
Kelly held the position for two seasons, from 1983 until 1984. His overall coaching record at Eastern NMU was 13 wins, 7 losses, and 1 ties. This ranks him seventh at Eastern NMU in terms of total wins and third at Eastern NMU in terms of winning percentage.

== Don Carthel ==
Carthel held the position for six seasons from 1985 until 1991 with 37 wins and 25 losses. Guided the Greyhounds to their first ever conference title in 1991. Michael Sinclair was the MVP of the team and played for the Seattle Seahawks for six seasons. He led the NFL in sacks in his fifth season beating out the late Reggie White.

Other standout players:

- Anthony Pertile – Midland, Texas
- Murray Garrett – Bay City, Texas
- Pete Sanders – Roswell, New Mexico
- Ron Arrington – Pampa, Texas
- Thomas Young – Bay City, Texas

== Howard Stearns ==
Stearns held the position for two seasons, from 1992 until 1993. His overall coaching record at Eastern NMU was 6 wins, 13 losses, and 1 tie. This ranks him 12th at Eastern NMU in terms of total wins and 11th at Eastern NMU in terms of winning percentage.

== Harold Elliott ==
Elliott held the position for eleven seasons, from 1994 until 2004, with a 68 wins, 49 losses, and 2 ties. Elliott led the Greyhound to seven consecutive winning seasons and 2 Lone Star South Co-championships.
