= Addison Wiley =

American middle-distance runner

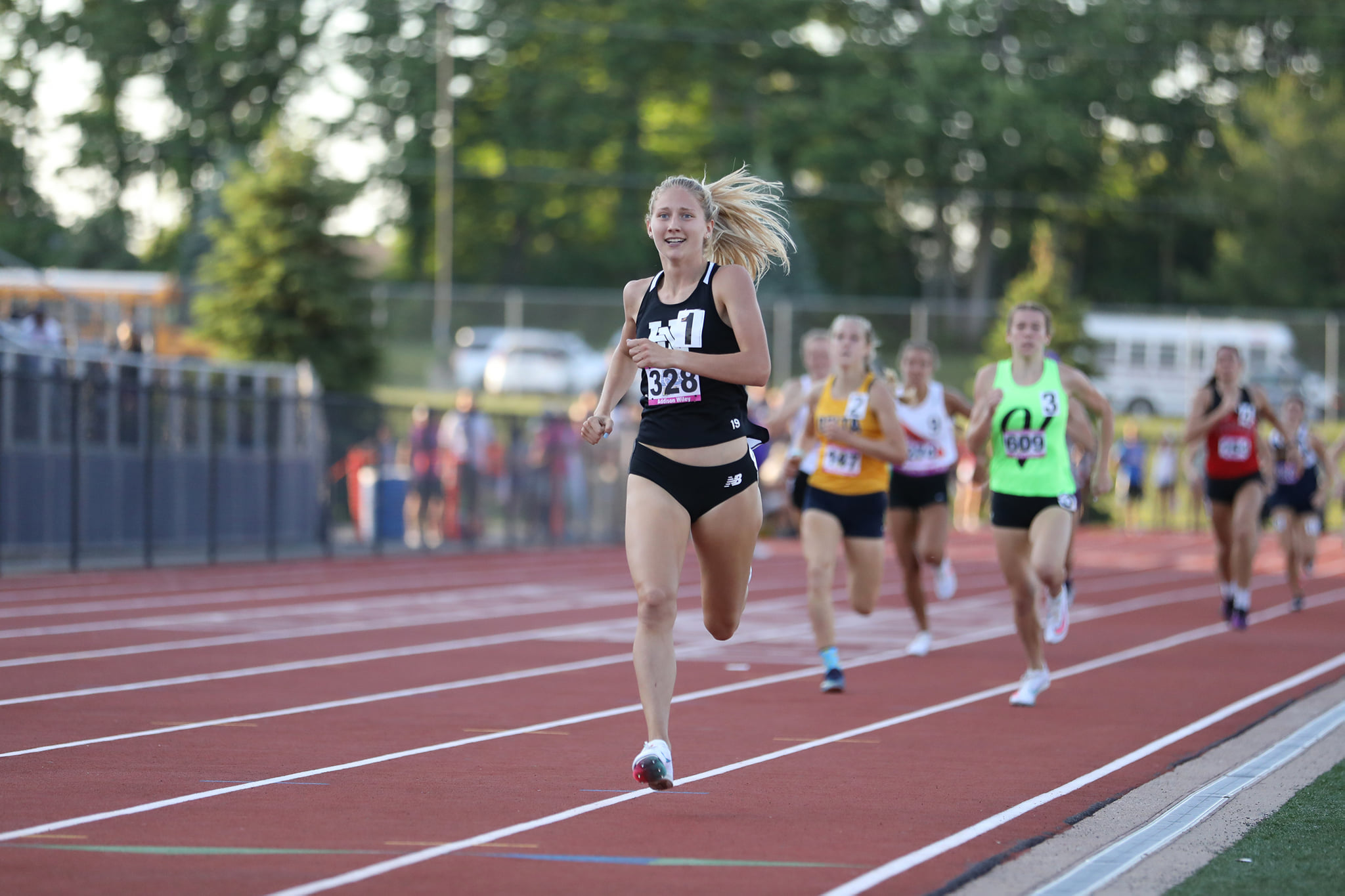

Personal information
- Born: October 24, 2003 (age 23)
- Home town: Huntington, Indiana, U.S.
- Employer: Adidas
- Height: 5 ft 8 in (173 cm)

Sport
- Country: United States
- Sport: Track and field, Cross Country
- Events: 800 m, 1500 m, Mile
- College team: Huntington University
- Turned pro: January 23, 2024

Achievements and titles
- Personal bests: 400 m: 57.12 (Huntington 2022); 600 m: 1:27.33 (Indianapolis 2026); 800 m: 1:56.83 (Szczecin, Poland 2024); 1000 m: 2:30.71 (Monaco 2025) AR; 1500 m: 3:59.17 (Brussels, Belgium 2023); 1600 m: 4:26.16 (Allendale 2022); Mile: 4:30.19 (West Chester 2024); Road mile: 4:25.5 (Des Moines 2026); 3000 m: 9:24.28i (Allendale 2022); 5000 m: 17:16.15 (Myrtle Beach 2021)
Medal record
Women's athletics
Representing the United States
World Indoor Championships
Bronze medal – third place	2026 Toruń	800 m
World Road Running Championships
Gold medal – first place	2026 Copenhagen	Mile mixed team
NACAC U23 Championships
Gold medal – first place	2023 San Jose	1500m

Addison "Addy" Wiley (born October 24, 2003) is an American professional middle- and long-distance runner and the American Record Holder in the 1000m.

Wiley is an eight-time NAIA national champion in cross country and track and field. She held the high school national record for the 1600m with a time of 4:26.16 and the collegiate record for the 1500m with a time of 3:59.17. She placed 5th in the World Athletics U20 Championships in the 1500m in 2022 and won gold in the NACAC U23 championships in 2023. She placed 2nd at the USATF indoor championships in the 800m to qualify for the 2024 world indoor championships in Glasgow, United Kingdom.

== High school career ==
Wiley attended Huntington North High School in Huntington, Indiana. She was a multi-sport athlete that did not fully commit to running until her senior season. She played on the varsity soccer team and was named All-Conference all four years, earning First Team honors as a sophomore, junior, and senior while leading her team in goals scored. She also played varsity basketball as a freshman and sophomore.

=== 2019 ===
In her freshman track season, Wiley ran the fastest time ever by an Indiana freshman in winning her first state championship in the 1600m in 4:46.93. She added another All-State performance by placing 7th in the 800m in 2:13.26.

As a sophomore in the fall, she competed in cross country for the first time. Despite limited running training due to being a member of the soccer team, Wiley achieved All-State by placing 10th at the state championships in 18:28.6.

=== 2020 ===
Wiley was unable to defend her 1600m state championship title in spring of her sophomore year due to the COVID-19 pandemic.

In the fall of her junior year, Wiley achieved All-State status in cross country again by placing 6th with a time of 18:25.9.

=== 2021 ===
On March 26 & 28, Wiley competed in the NSAF USA Meet of Champions in Myrtle Beach, South Carolina where she won the mile in 4:48.23 and placed second in the 5000m in 17:16.15.

At the 2021 IHSAA State Track and Field Championships, she became the first Indiana runner to win both the 800m (2:08.62) and the 1600m (4:45.27). She was subsequently named the 2020–2021 Gatorade Player of the Year award winner for Indiana Girls Track and Field.

On June 12, Wiley competed in the RunningLane Track Championships in Madison, Alabama. She won the mile in a new personal record of 4:38.14, the fastest high school time in the nation in 2021 and the fastest ever by an Indiana runner. Her time also ranked No. 9 on the all-time high school list for the outdoor mile.

Wiley next traveled to Renton, Washington to compete in the Brooks PR Invitational. Despite finishing second, her time of 2:04.41 was a new Indiana state record and the No. 5 fastest time in the nation for 2021.

Wiley ended her track season on July 3 at the Nike Outdoor National Championships at historic Hayward Field in Eugene, Oregon. She won her first high school national championship in the mile with a time of 4:42.78.

On October 30, Wiley finished her high school cross country career, achieving All-State status for the third time by placing 7th with a time of 18:40.2.

Wiley signed her National Letter of Intent with the University of Colorado on November 22, but would de-commit the following summer to enroll at her hometown college, Huntington University.

=== 2022 ===
Wiley opened her senior track season on March 12 at Nike Indoor Nationals at the Ocean Breeze Athletic Complex on Staten Island, New York. She earned All-America honors in both the 800m (3rd in 2:09.52) and the mile (2nd in 4:52.55).

At the 2022 IHSAA State Track and Field Championships on June 3, she repeated as state champion in both the 800m and 1600m. For the second consecutive year, she completed the double that no other Indiana runner has ever accomplished. She won the 1600m in 4:38.69 and the 800m in 2:06.26, both of which were state meet records. She then finished third in the 3200m in 10:38.57, and finally anchored the 4x400 relay team with a split time of 57.03. All four races were run within a timespan of only two hours, 17 minutes.

Wiley finished her high school career as a five-time Indiana State Champion and holder of six school records – 200m (26.24), 400m (57.12), 800m (2:04.40), 1600m (4:37.98), mile (4:38.14), and 3200m (10:13.40). For the second consecutive year, Wiley was honored as the 2021–2022 Gatorade Player of the Year award winner for Indiana Girls Track and Field.

On June 11, one week after the state championship meet, Wiley competed in the Midwest Redemption Meet at Grand Valley State University in Allendale, Michigan. Her 1600m time of 4:26.16 broke the national high school record of 4:33.29, set by Alexa Efraimson in 2014. Her time converts to a 4:27.71 for the mile, faster than the overall national record of 4:28.25 set by Mary Cain in 2013 and the outdoor mile record of 4:33.87 set by Katelyn Tuohy in 2018.

Wiley next competed in the Nike Outdoor National Championships in Eugene, Oregon, on June 19. She won her second national title, this time in the 800m. Her winning time of 2:04.64 was the No. 5 fastest time in the nation for 2022.

The following weekend, Wiley again competed in Eugene in the USATF U20 Outdoor Championships. She won her first USA Track & Field national title in the 1500m with a time of 4:15.53. Her placing earned her a spot on the United States team that would compete in the World Athletics U20 Championships the following month.

At the 2022 World Athletics U20 Championships in Cali, Colombia, Wiley qualified for the final by placing second in her heat with a time of 4:19.39. In the final, Wiley placed 4th with a personal record of 4:11.43.

== College career ==
=== 2022 ===
Wiley began her collegiate career at Huntington University in the fall of 2022. She won her first three cross country races, the Louisville Classic in Louisville, Kentucky, the Great Lakes Challenge in Grand Rapids, Michigan, and the Crossroads League Championships hosted by Marian University in Shelbyville, Indiana. At the 2022 NAIA Cross Country Championships held in Apalachee Regional Park in Tallahassee, Florida, Wiley finished in second place to earn her first collegiate All-America honor with a time of 16:58.9. Huntington placed 13th overall in the team standings.

=== 2023 ===
Wiley opened her track season at the Camel City Elite Races at the JDL Fast Track in Winston-Salem, North Carolina. Her mile time of 4:32.15 set a new NAIA national record and was the fastest collegiate time ever run at the Camel City Elite Races. She had to decline the $6,000 winnings due to NAIA regulations. It was the first time a collegiate athlete had won an Elite Race at Camel City.

On February 18, Wiley competed in the 1500m at the 2023 USA Indoor Track and Field Championships in Albuquerque, New Mexico. In a field consisting of 10 professional runners and only two collegiates, Wiley led the race for the first 1200m before ultimately placing 4th with a time of 4:18.84. She again had to decline the $1,500 prize money.

At the 2023 NAIA indoor track and field championships held in Brookings, South Dakota, Wiley won five national championships and broke one meet record in a span of only three hours, 55 minutes. She started the day by winning the mile in 4:48.04. An hour later, she won the 600m in a meet record time of 1:29.47. Forty-five minutes later, Wiley won the 800m in 2:10.93 and only thirty-five minutes later, she won the 3000m in 9:47.57. She finished the day by anchoring Huntington's Distance Medley Relay team to victory in 11:46.74. Only 13 female athletes in NAIA history have won five or more indoor titles in a four-year career; Wiley accomplished it in less than four hours. She was named the meet's Most Valuable Performer and the Huntington women's team finished as the national runner-up.

Wiley was named the 2023 NAIA women's indoor track & field National Track Athlete of the Year and the 2023 NAIA Women's Indoor Track & Field National Scholar Track Athlete of the Year by the U.S. Track & Field and Cross Country Coaches Association. In addition to her five national championships, she maintained a 3.512 cumulative GPA.

Wiley began her outdoor season on the roads, competing in the USATF Mile Road Championships in Des Moines, Iowa on April 25. Despite being the only non-professional runner in the 20-woman field, she placed 3rd with a time of 4:30.94. Her time was the 6th fastest in the nine-year history of the event. As an amateur, she had to decline the $1,500 prize for third place.

Wiley remained in Des Moines to compete against another professional field in the Drake Relays. She placed 4th in the 1500m with an NAIA record time of 4:12.53. She suffered her only loss of the year to a collegiate runner in a track final, losing to Canadian Simone Plourde of the University of Utah.

At the end of May, Wiley competed in the NAIA Women's Outdoor Track and Field Championship held at Indiana Wesleyan University in Marion, Indiana. She added two more national championships to her résumé, winning both the 800m (2:04.29) and the 1500m (4:14.56), along with running a leg of Huntington's 5th place 4 × 800 m relay in 2:01.25. The Huntington women's team placed 6th in the team standings.

Wiley was named the 2023 NAIA women's outdoor track & field National Scholar Track Athlete of the Year by the U.S. Track & Field and Cross Country Coaches Association and the Crossroads League Female Athlete of the Year. In total, she won seven NAIA national championships, nine NAIA All-America honors, nine Crossroads League Athlete of the Weeks honors, six NAIA Athlete of the Week honors, and was the NAIA Runner-up in cross country during her freshman year. Wiley also set five NAIA records and established two more NAIA all-conditions/out-of-competition records.

Wiley began her summer racing schedule at the Music City Track Carnival at Vanderbilt University in Nashville, Tennessee on June 3, part of the American Track League professional series. Her winning time of 4:03.22 time was the second fastest collegiate time in history behind only Jennifer Simpson, who won four Olympic and World Championship medals in the 1500m including the 2011 World Championship gold medal. The time broke the meet record of 4:03.64 set by 2021 Olympian Cory McGee and also met the World Athletics Championships standard of 4:03.50. Wiley again had to decline a cash prize, this time for $2,000.

Wiley next competed in the 2023 USA Outdoor Track and Field Championships in Eugene, Oregon. On July 6, Wiley won her semi-final heat with a time of 4:09.53, finishing ahead of 2021 Olympic gold medalist Athing Mu and Olympian Cory McGee. Two days later, she finished 5th in the final with a time of 4:04.25. As a result of her placing, Wiley earned a spot on the United States team that would participate in the NACAC U23 Championships later that month but had to decline another $2,000 prize.

On July 23, Wiley represented the United States in the NACAC U23 Championships in San José, Costa Rica. The meet consists of athletes from North America, Central America, and the Caribbean. Competing in the 1500m, she won the gold medal and set a new meet record with a time of 4:05.84, her third sub-4:06 performance since the start of June. The previous record of 4:15.52 was set in 2014 by Canada's Jenna Westaway.

Wiley continued her 2023 track season at the Ed Murphey Classic held at Rhodes College in Memphis, Tennessee, another stop on the American Track League professional series. She defeated a professional field that included 2023 World Championship team member Kaela Edwards to win in a personal record of 1:59.00, the fastest collegiate time in the nation in 2023. Wiley became the only female collegiate runner to ever run under 2:00 in the 800m and under 4:04 in the 1500m in her career. The following day, she competed on the roads again, this time in the Beale Street Murphey Mile against another field of professionals. Wiley bested a field led by three-time NCAA Champion Dani Jones to win in 4:37.7. Wiley earned $1,000 for each win but was required to decline it as an amateur athlete.

In September, Wiley made her first appearance on the European track circuit at the Galà dei Castelli meet in Bellinzona, Switzerland. She placed 2nd to Jamaica's Natoya Goule with a new PR of 1:57.64, making her the second fastest collegiate 800m runner of all-time behind only Olympic gold medalist Athing Mu. Both Wiley and Goule broke the meet record. Wiley's time ranks No. 3 in the US and No. 8 in the world for 2023 and makes her the 11th fastest American of all time.

On September 8, Wiley competed in her first Diamond League event, the Memorial Van Damme in Brussels, Belgium. She placed 8th in a field of 15, all but one of whom had previously competed in the Olympics and/or World Championships. Her time of 3:59.17 broke the all-time collegiate 1500m record of 3:59.90 set by Jennifer Simpson in 2009. It also made her the 10th fastest American of all-time and ranks her No. 2 in the US and No. 19 in the world for 2023. Wiley joined Mary Slaney as the only American women in history to run both sub-1:58 for 800m and sub-4:00 for 1500m during a career. She became the third youngest runner to ever accomplish the feat at the age of 19 years, 319 days.

Wiley represented the United States at the World Road Mile Championships in Riga, Latvia on October 1. She placed 9th with a time of 4:36.03.

On November 17, 2023, Wiley won the NAIA cross country national championship in Vancouver, Washington, in a time of 21:04.2.

=== 2024 ===
On January 9, Wiley was named to the 2024 Bowerman Preseason Watch List, becoming the first NAIA athlete to ever receive the honor.

== Professional career ==
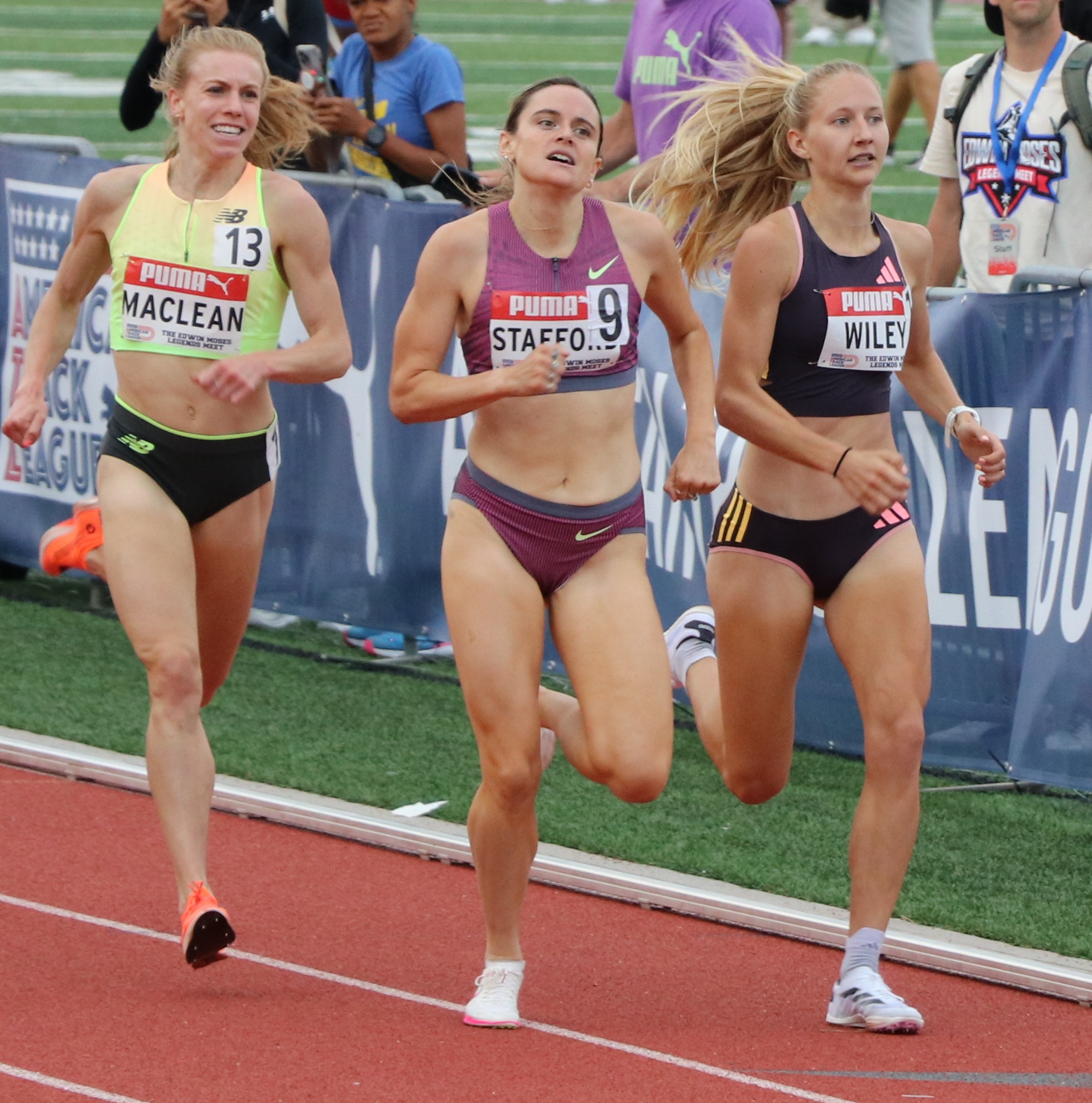
Addy Wiley competing in the 2024 Edwin Moses Legends Meet in Atlanta.

=== 2024 ===
On January 23, 2024, Wiley announced that she had signed a professional contract with Adidas and would forgo her final three seasons at Huntington University. Three days later, she made her professional debut at the PNC Lenny Lyles Invitational at the University of Louisville where she won the 800m.

At the USATF Indoor Championships, Wiley placed 2nd in the 800m in a new indoor personal best to qualify for the 2024 World Indoor Championships in Glasgow, United Kingdom. In Glasgow, she placed 3rd in her first-round heat but failed to qualify for the semifinals.

Wiley opened her outdoor season in Xiamen, China, competing in her second Diamond League event. She ran her second best ever 1500m in Atlanta on May 31 in her final tune-up for the Olympic Trials. Unfortunately, a bout of food poisoning sent her to the hospital and shortly afterward she injured her hamstring, forcing her to miss a lot of training in the weeks before the Trials.

At the Olympic Trials in Eugene, Oregon, Wiley competed in both the 800m and 1500m. She advanced to the semifinals of the 800m and then advanced to the final of the 1500m, where she placed 11th.

Following the Trials and having recovered from her injury, Wiley proceeded to win five of her next six races while running three of her four fastest times ever in the 800m. On August 28, she ran a new personal best and meet record in the 800m of 1:56.83, making her the 5th fastest American of all time. This performance made her one of only 22 runners in history to run under 1:57 for 800m and under 4:00 for 1500m during a career. She is the second youngest runner to ever achieve this honor.

On August 31, Wiley set her first American Record while competing in the Mityng Ambasadorów Białostockiego i Podlaskiego Sportu meet in Białystok, Poland. Her time of 2:31.49 broke the 1000m record held by four-time Olympian Regina Jacobs that had stood for 25 years. Wiley's time ranks as #12 all-time on the world list.

Wiley finished her 2024 season with a 3rd place at the Zurich Diamond League and a 4th place at the inaugural Athlos event. She finished the year with the #1 time in the United States in the 800m (5th fastest all-time by an American), #1 in the 1000m (American Record), and #11 in the 1500m. Worldwide, she ran the #5 fastest time at 800m and the #2 fastest time at 1000m (12th fastest in history).

=== 2025 ===
Opened her 2025 season at the Millrose Games, running a new indoor 800m PR of 2:00.14. In May, she placed 5th in the Shanghai Diamond League and 3rd in the Rabat Diamond League events. On May 27, she moved to #1 in the US rankings and into the top-10 in the world rankings in the 800m for the first time. In July, Wiley recorded two runners-up finishes in the Monaco Diamond League and the London Diamond League events. In Monaco, she broke her own NACAC record in the 1000m with a time of 2:30.71, moving her to #8 all-time on the world list. She finished the Diamond League season as the points leader and qualified for her first Diamond League Final, where she finished 8th.

== Personal life ==
When Wiley was 10-years-old, doctors discovered an extremely rare tumor known as an inflammatory myofibroblastic tumor between her right lung and her diaphragm. An IMT occurs in less than one in one million people and roughly 150–200 cases occur in the United States each year. The tennis ball sized tumor was pressing on her lung and causing high fevers, extreme fatigue and headaches. IMT's are usually benign but Wiley's was not. Doctors were able to completely remove the tumor surgically and no further treatments were necessary other than routine checkups. During the surgery, parts of her lung and diaphragm were removed and are held together today by two titanium staples.

In September 2023, in conjunction with her first track meets on the European circuit and Childhood Cancer Awareness Month, Wiley announced a fundraiser for patients at Riley Hospital for Children in Indianapolis, the hospital where she received her life saving cancer treatments ten years earlier. She promised to match donations up to $5,000. She has previously stated in an interview, "As a cancer survivor, I also like advocating for other children battling cancer, as a professional runner someday I plan to donate a large portion of my prize money to support children experiencing cancer." In September 2024, she teamed up with Adidas to send care packages to children who are battling cancer.

== Achievements ==
=== International competitions ===
Representing the United States
Year	Competition	Venue	Position	Event	Time
2022	World U20 Championships	Cali, Colombia	5th	1500m	4:11.43 PB
2023	NACAC U23 Championships	San José, Costa Rica	1st	1500m	4:05.84 CR
2023	World Road Running Championships	Riga, Latvia	9th	Mile	4:36.03
2024	World Indoor Championships	Glasgow, Scotland	17th	800m	2:02.69
2026	World Indoor Championships	Toruń, Poland	3rd	800m	1:58.36 PB
2026	World Ultimate Championship	Budapest, Hungary	4th	800 m	1:57.54

=== National championships ===
Representing Huntington University (2023) and adidas (2024-present)
Year	Competition	Venue	Position	Event	Time
2022	USATF U20 Championships	Eugene, Oregon	1st	1500m	4:15.53
2023	USATF Indoor Championships	Albuquerque, New Mexico	4th	1500m	4:18.84 PB
2023	USATF 1 Mile Road Championships	Des Moines, Iowa	3rd	Mile	4:30.94 PB
2023	USATF Outdoor Championships	Eugene, Oregon	5th	1500m	4:04.25
2024	USATF Indoor Championships	Albuquerque, New Mexico	2nd	800m	2:00.70 PB
2024	USA Olympic Trials	Eugene, Oregon	19th	800m	2:02.42
2024	USA Olympic Trials	Eugene, Oregon	11th	1500m	4:06.59
2025	USATF Indoor Championships	Staten Island, New York	7th	800m	2:00.89
2025	USATF Outdoor Championships	Eugene, Oregon	9th	800m	2:02.14
2025	USATF Cross Country Championships	Portland, Oregon	10th	2 km	6:39.5
2026	USATF Indoor Championships	Staten Island, New York	1st	800m	1:59.43 PB
2026	USATF 1 Mile Road Championships	Des Moines, Iowa	1st	Mile	4:25.5 PB
2026	USATF Outdoor Championships	New York City, New York	2nd	1500m	4:06.96
2026	USATF Outdoor Championships	New York City, New York	2nd	800m	1:59.40

=== Diamond League performances ===
Denotes the event served as the Diamond League Final
Date	Competition	Venue	Position	Event	Time
2023	Memorial Van Damme	Brussels, Belgium	8th	1500m	3:59.17 CR PB
2024	Xiamen Diamond League	Xiamen, China	11th	1500m	4:03.45 SB
2024	Weltklasse Zürich	Zürich, Switzerland	3rd	800m	1:58.16
2025	Shanghai Diamond League	Shaoxing, China	5th	800m	1:58.59 SB
2025	Meeting International Mohammed VI d'Athlétisme de Rabat	Rabat, Morocco	3rd	800m	1:57.55 SB
2025	BAUHAUS-galan	Stockholm, Sweden	7th	800m	1:58.86
2025	Herculis	Fontvieille, Monaco	2nd	1000m	2:30.71 AR
2025	London Athletics Meet	London, United Kingdom	2nd	800m	1:57.43 SB
2025	Athletissima	Lausanne, Switzerland	9th	800m	1:59.64
2025	Weltklasse Zürich	Zürich, Switzerland	8th	800m	1:59.14
2026	Meeting International Mohammed VI d'Athlétisme de Rabat	Rabat, Morocco	12th	800m	2:00.19
2026	Doha Diamond League	Doha, Qatar	1st	800m	1:57.98 SB
2026	Prefontaine Classic	Eugene, Oregon	3rd	800m	1:57.70 SB
2026	London Athletics Meet	London, United Kingdom	7th	800m	2:00.01

=== Circuit performances ===
Grand Slam Track results
Slam	Race group	Event	Pl.	Time	Prize money
2025 Philadelphia Slam	Short distance	1500 m	6th	4:07.41	US$12,500
2025 Philadelphia Slam	Short distance	800 m	6th	2:00.93	US$12,500

=== NAIA championships ===
Representing Huntington University
Year	Competition	Venue	Position	Event	Time
2022	NAIA XC Championships	Tallahassee, Florida	2nd	5K	16:58.9
2023	NAIA Indoor Championships	Brookings, South Dakota	1st	600 m	1:29.47
2023	NAIA Indoor Championships	Brookings, South Dakota	1st	800 m	2:10.93
2023	NAIA Indoor Championships	Brookings, South Dakota	1st	Mile	4:48.04
2023	NAIA Indoor Championships	Brookings, South Dakota	1st	3000 m	9:47.57
2023	NAIA Indoor Championships	Brookings, South Dakota	1st	DMR	11:46.74
2023	NAIA Outdoor Championships	Marion, Indiana	1st	800 m	2:04.29
2023	NAIA Outdoor Championships	Marion, Indiana	1st	1500 m	4:14.56
2023	NAIA Outdoor Championships	Marion, Indiana	5th	4 × 800 m relay	9:10.21
2023	NAIA XC Championships	Vancouver, WA	1st	6K	21:04.2

=== NAIA records ===
Event	Time	Venue	Date
Outdoor
800 meters	1:59.00	Memphis, Tennessee	August 4, 2023
1500 meters	4:03.22	Nashville, Tennessee	June 3, 2023
Indoor
600 meters	1:29.47	Brookings, South Dakota	March 4, 2023
800 meters	2:02.33	Allendale, Michigan	February 10, 2023
1500 meters	4:18.84	Albuquerque, New Mexico	February 16, 2023
One mile	4:32.15	Winston-Salem, North Carolina	February 4, 2023

=== Honors and awards ===
- 2020-2021 Gatorade Player of the Year Indiana Girls Track and Field
- 2021-2022 Gatorade Player of the Year Indiana Girls Track and Field
- 2022 USTFCCCA Great Lakes Region Cross Country Athlete of the Year
- 2023 USTFCCCA Great Lakes Region Indoor Track Athlete of the Year
- 2023 NAIA Women's Indoor Track and Field National Track Athlete of the Year
- 2023 NAIA Women's Indoor Track and Field National Scholar Track Athlete of the Year
- 2023 USTFCCCA Great Lakes Region Outdoor Track Athlete of the Year
- 2023 NAIA Women's Outdoor Track and Field National Scholar Track Athlete of the Year
- 2022-2023 Crossroads League Female Athlete of the Year
- 2023 NAIA Women's Cross Country National Scholar Athlete of the Year

=== Other ===
- 2x American Record Holder 1000m
- Youngest American to ever run sub-4:00 for 1500m - 19 years, 319 days (Previous youngest Mary Decker - 22 years, 9 days)
- One of only two Americans to ever run sub-4:00 for 1500m and sub-1:58 for 800m - 19 years, 319 days; Mary Decker - 24 years, 361 days
- 2nd youngest female to ever run sub-4:00 for 1500m and sub-1:57 for 800m
- 3rd youngest female to ever run sub-4:00 for 1500m and sub-1:58 for 800m
- 2nd youngest American to ever run sub-1:58 for 800m - 19 years, 315 days (Athing Mu - 18 years, 313 days)

== Personal bests ==
Track	Event	Time	Competition	Location	Date
Indoor	600 m	1:27.33	Hoosier Horsepower Classic	Indianapolis, Indiana	January 16, 2026
Indoor	800 m	1:58.36	World Athletics Indoor Championships	Toruń, Poland	March 22, 2026
Indoor	1000 m	2:35.77	Millrose Games	New York City, New York	February 1, 2026
Indoor	1500 m	4:07.32	New Balance Indoor Grand Prix	Boston, Massachusetts	February 4, 2024
Indoor	Mile	4:32.15	Camel City Elite Races	Winston-Salem, North Carolina	February 4, 2023
Indoor	3000 m	9:24.28	GVSU Holiday Open	Allendale, Michigan	December 9, 2022
Outdoor	800 m	1:56.83	International Wiesław Maniak Memorial	Szczecin, Poland	August 28, 2024
Outdoor	1000 m	2:30.71 AR	Herculis	Fontvieille, Monaco	July 11, 2025
Outdoor	1500 m	3:59.17	Memorial Van Damme	Brussels, Belgium	September 8, 2023
Outdoor	1600 m	4:26.16	Midwest Redemption Meet	Allendale, Michigan	June 11, 2022
Outdoor	Mile	4:30.19	West Chester Mile	West Chester, Pennsylvania	August 8, 2024
Outdoor	5000 m	17:16.15	NSAF Meet of Champions	Myrtle Beach, South Carolina	March 26, 2021
Road	Mile	4:25.5	USATF 1 Mile Road Championships	Des Moines, Iowa	April 21, 2026
