= Joe Palmisano =

American football player and coach

Biographical details
- Born: c. 1954

Playing career
- 1972–1975: Iowa State

Coaching career (HC unless noted)
- 1983–1984: UTEP (GA)
- 1985: Carson–Newman (assistant)
- 1986: Wingate (assistant)
- 1987-1989: Greenville (assistant)
- 1990-1991: Cumberland (TN) (assistant)
- 1993–1994: Malone
- 1995–1996: Akron (WR/RC)
- 1997: Akron (DB)
- 1998–2000: Akron (DC)

Head coaching record
- Overall: 9–9–1

Joe Palmisano (born c. 1954) is an American former college football player and coach. He served as the head football coach at Malone College from 1993 to 1994, compiling a record of 9–9–1.

== Playing career ==
Palmisano played college football at Iowa State University in Ames, Iowa from 1972 until 1975, and graduated with a B.A. in 1976.

== Coaching career ==
=== Malone College ===
Palmisano was the first head football coach for the Malone Pioneers located in Canton, Ohio and he held that position for two seasons, from 1993 until 1994. His career coaching record at Malone was 9–9–1. This ranks him fifth at Malone in total wins and third at Malone in winning percentage.

=== Other coaching positions ===
Palmisano worked at several other coaching positions in football. At the University of Akron, he was recruiting coordinator and wide receivers coach in 1995 and 1996, defensive secondary head coach in 1997, and in 1998 became the team's defensive coordinator where he remained until the conclusion of the 2000 season. He later became a sports broadcaster for the college football games.

Palmisano later became an assistant coach with the Canton Legends of the American Indoor Football League.

== Broadcasting career ==
Palmisano was the Saturday morning talk show from 8:00 a.m. to 11:00 a.m. on News-Talk 1480 WHBC in Canton, Ohio until 2021.
