= Tanya Hockman =

American volleyball coach and administrator

Tanya Hockman is the Malone University athletic director and coach of women's volleyball at Malone University in Canton, Ohio. 2012 will be her thirteenth season at the school as head coach and through the 2009 season, her lifetime coaching record is 260–151. She also served as an assistant Malone women's basketball coach from 1995 to 2001.

Hockman is also currently serving as an adjunct instructor in the Department of Theology (Sports Ministries) at Malone University. She is also the National Christian College Athletic Association East Region Volleyball Chair, a position she has held since 2005 and is a former board member of both the Association of Church Sports and Recreation Ministries and the Regional Sports Consortium.

== Coaching achievements ==
At Malone, Hockman has coached two NAIA Honorable Mention honorees (Angela Lockhart and Brandie Beebe), two AMC Player of the Year recipients (Angela Lockhart and Kim Slone) and six NAIA All-America Scholar Athletes. Hockman was awarded Coach of the Year by the American Mideast Conference in 2000, 2001 and the Tachikara/AVCA NAIA Region IX Coach of the Year in 2001.

== Personal life ==
Hockman graduated with a Bachelor of Arts in Christian Ministries at Malone in 1994 and in 1999 completed a master's degree in Christian Ministries also from Malone. She and her husband Scott and three daughters reside in North Canton, Ohio.

Tanya and her husband, Scott, also a Malone graduate (1994), and their 3 daughters reside in North Canton.
