= Fred Thomas (American football coach) =

American football player and coach

Biographical details
- Born: May 4, 1955 (age 71)
- Education: Timken High School (1973); Youngstown State University (1979); Ashland University (1994)

Coaching career (HC unless noted)
- 1978–1986: Youngstown State (Defensive Line Coach 1978-1983) (Defensive Coordinator 1984-1986)
- 1987-1989: Girard High School (Head Coach)
- 1990-1991: Alliance High School (Head Coach)
- 1992–1998: GlenOak High School (Head Coach)
- 1999-2014: Walsh University (Assistant Head Coach & Defensive Coordinator)
- 2015: Malone University (Defensive Assistant)
- 2015–2018: Malone University (Head Coach)
- 2019: University of Mount Union (Offensive Line Assistant)
- 2020: Sandy Valley High School (Defensive Line and Linebackers Assistant)

Head coaching record
- Overall: 4–25

Accomplishments and honors

Awards
- 1979 NCAA Division II National Runner-Up; 1987 Mahoning Valley Coach of the Year; 1991 Stark County Division I Coach of the Year; 1993 Stark County Amateur Baseball Hall of Fame; 1994 Federal League Coach of the Year

Fred Thomas is an American retired football coach. He was the seventh and final head coach for the Malone Pioneers in Canton, Ohio from 2015 to 2018. After the announcement of the conclusion of the football program at Malone, Thomas became an assistant football coach for the Mount Union Purple Raiders in Alliance, Ohio beginning in the 2019 season. He had previously served as an assistant coach at Malone for the 2015 season.

== Coaching history ==
=== Assistant coaching and high school ===
Thomas was the defensive coordinator at Walsh University for 16 seasons and worked at Youngstown State from 1978 to 1986. He also was a high school head coach at Girard, Alliance, and GlenOak and an voluntary assistant at Sandy Valley, all in Ohio. He became an assistant coach at Malone for the 2015 season under Eric Hehman.

=== Malone University Pioneers ===
When Hehman resigned at Malone University, it took the university just over 24 hours to offer the new head coach position to Thomas, something that Malone athletic director Charlie Grimes said was an easy move—a decision they said was based in confidence, excitement, respect, and heart. Thomas took over the program after its first winless year in school history and coached the team during its first season in the Great Midwest Athletic Conference. As the first season progressed, three teams including Malone had come together to start conference play in 2016 and Malone finished third among the three.

After the conclusion of the 2018 season, Thomas heard the decision to discontinue the program fifteen minutes before having to tell his assistant coaches and players.

== Head coaching record ==
Year	Team	Overall	Conference	Standing	Bowl/playoffs
Malone Pioneers (Great Midwest Athletic Conference) (2016–2018)
2016	Malone Pioneers	1–8	0–2	3rd	
2017	Malone Pioneers	1–9	1–6	8th	
2018	Malone Pioneers	2–8	1–7	8th	
Malone Pioneers:		4–25	2–16		
Total:		4–25			
