= Cedarville Yellow Jackets =

College sports teams of Ceadarville university

- University: Cedarville University
- Nickname: Yellow Jackets
- NCAA: Division II
- Conference: G-MAC
- Athletic director: Christopher Cross
- Varsity teams: 17 (8 men's, 9 women's)
- Basketball arena: Callan Athletic Center
- Baseball stadium: Yellow Jacket Field
- Soccer stadium: Yellow Jacket Soccer Complex
- Colors: Blue and yellow
- Mascot: Stinger
- Website: yellowjackets.cedarville.edu
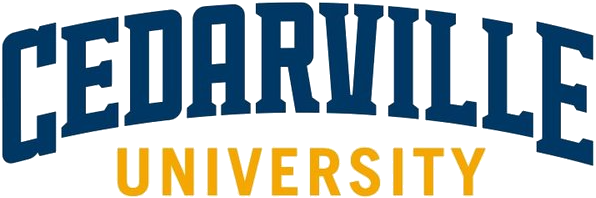

The Cedarville Yellow Jackets represent Cedarville University, Ohio, in intercollegiate sports. The Yellow Jackets compete at the NCAA Division II level as member of in the Great Midwest Athletic Conference (G-MAC) and also hold membership with the National Christian College Athletic Association (NCCAA). The official school colors are blue and gold. Men's sports include baseball, basketball, cross country, golf, soccer, tennis and indoor track and field, and outdoor track and field. Women's sports include basketball, cross country, soccer, softball, tennis, indoor track and field, outdoor track and field, and volleyball.

== History ==
The university became a full member of NCAA Division II on July 12, 2012. In 2013 the university joined five other regional institutions to form the Great Midwest Athletic Conference.

Prior to joining the NCAA, Cedarville competed as a member of the National Association of Intercollegiate Athletics (NAIA) in the American Mideast Conference (AMC). Cedarville ended their affiliation with the NAIA after the 2010–11 academic year, after competing in the NAIA for over 60 years. The university was one of the founding members of the AMC, then known as the Mid-Ohio League, in 1949. In 2007, the women's track program placed 2nd in the nation among all NAIA divisions. Both the men's and women's basketball teams have advanced to the NAIA Division II national basketball championships. In 2005, the men's team made it to the NAIA Division II final four, and in both 2004 and 2005 the women's team competed in the NAIA Division II championship game. Cedarville's women's sports won the American Mideast Conference (AMC) All-Sports Award for the 2004–2005 season. The women's cross country team won the school's only NAIA national title in any sport in 2001. The Lady Jackets also claimed the 2008 All-Ohio Intercollegiate Cross Country Championship which features all of the colleges and the universities in the state. They are the only NAIA program to ever win the All-Ohio women's title.

Since joining NCAA Division II, 10 Cedarville teams have competed in their respective NCAA Championships. Yellow Jacket golfer Jacob Forsyth competed in the NCAA Division II Super Regional (2013). Carsyn Koch won the 800-meter race at the NCAA Division II Track and Field Indoor and Outdoor Championships (2016, 2017)., competed at the U.S. Olympic Trials in 2016, and competed in the U.S. Outdoor National Track and Field Championships (2017). Dan Michalski won the 3,000-meter steeplechase at the NCAA Division II Track and Field Outdoor Championships (2017), becoming Cedarville's first men's NCAA Division II champion.

== Varsity teams ==
Men's sports	Women's sports
Baseball	Basketball
Basketball	Cross country
Cross country	Esports
Esports	Golf
Golf	Soccer
Soccer	Softball
Tennis	Tennis
Track and field	Track and field
	Volleyball

== National championships ==
=== Team ===
Sport	Association	Division	Year	Opponent/Runner-up	Score
Women's cross country (1)	NAIA	Single	2001	Concordia Nebraska	147–169

== Achievements ==
In 2007, the women's track program placed 2nd in the nation among all NAIA divisions. Both the men's and women's basketball teams have advanced to the NAIA Division II national basketball championships. In 2005, the men's team made it to the NAIA Division II final four, and in both 2004 and 2005 the women's team competed in the NAIA Division II championship game. Cedarville's women's sports won the AMC All-Sports Award for the 2004–2005 season. The women's cross country team won the school's only NAIA national title in any sport in 2001. The Lady Jackets also claimed the 2008 All-Ohio Intercollegiate Cross Country Championship which features all of the colleges and the universities in the state. They are the only NAIA program to ever win the All-Ohio women's title.
