= Malone Pioneers =

College sport team in Ohio

- University: Malone University
- Conference: GMAC
- NCAA: Division II
- Athletic director: Tanya Hockman
- Location: Canton, Ohio
- Varsity teams: 18 (8 men's, 9 women's, 1 co-ed)
- Basketball arena: Osborne Hall
- Baseball stadium: Thurman Munson Memorial Stadium
- Soccer stadium: King Field
- Aquatics center: C.T. Branin Natatorium
- Lacrosse stadium: King Field
- Golf course: Tannenhauf Golf Club
- Volleyball arena: Osborne Hall
- Mascot: J.W. Scout
- Nickname: Pioneers
- Fight song: Malone University Fight Song
- Colors: Blue and red
- Website: malonepioneers.com
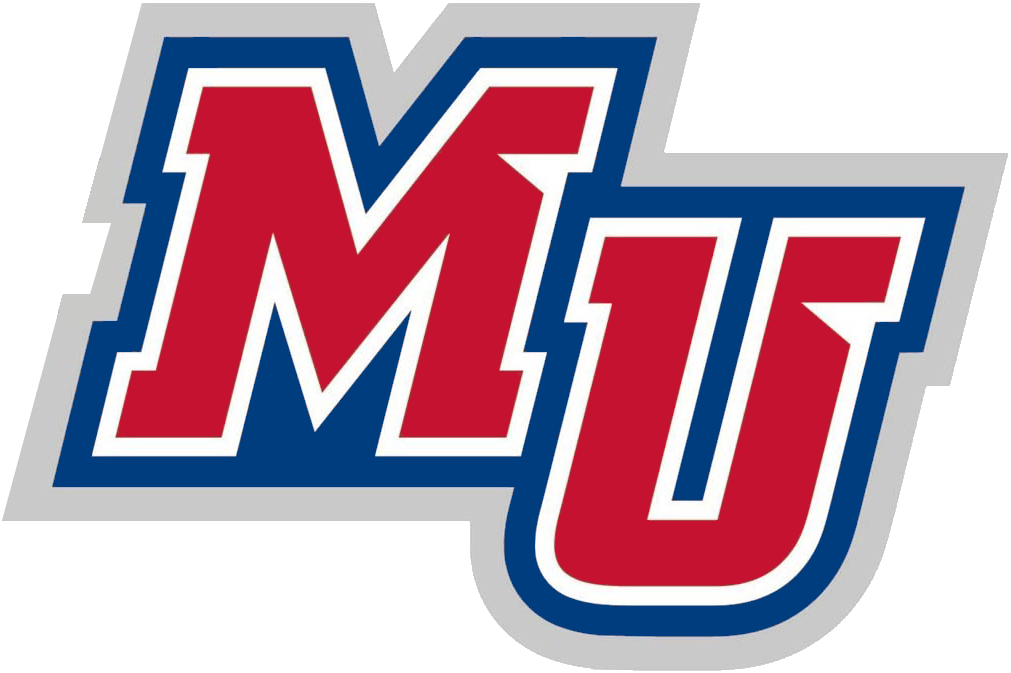

The Malone Pioneers are athletic teams of Malone University in Canton, Ohio, United States. The Pioneers compete in Division II of the National Collegiate Athletic Association (NCAA) as members of the Great Midwest Athletic Conference (G-MAC). Malone joined the G-MAC after four seasons in the Great Lakes Intercollegiate Athletic Conference (GLIAC) from 2012–13 to 2015–16. Malone joined the GLIAC and Division II in the 2011–12 season (as an independent in its provisional status) and completed the NCAA Division II membership process in July 2013 after having previously competed in the National Association of Intercollegiate Athletics (NAIA); mostly known for its tenure with the now-defunct American Mideast Conference from 1965–66 to 1988–89, and from 1993–94 to 2010–11.

In 2016, the Pioneers began play in the Great Midwest Athletic Conference, also known as the G-MAC.

== Varsity teams ==
Men's sports	Women's sports
Baseball	Basketball
Basketball	Cross country
Cross country	Golf
Golf	Lacrosse
Lacrosse	Soccer
Soccer	Softball
Swimming	Swimming
Track and field	Track and field
	Volleyball
Co-ed sports
eSports

=== Baseball ===
The baseball team, founded in 1963, plays home games at Thurman Munson Memorial Stadium, their home since 2021. The team previously played at the stadium from 2008 through 2015, before using the baseball field at nearby Jackson High School from 2016 through 2020. During the 2016 and 2017 seasons, the team also held a few home games at Schoonover Stadium on the campus of Kent State University. The program's longest tenured coach is Bob Starcher, who led the Pioneer baseball program for 23 seasons, accumulating 521 wins. During Starcher's tenure as head coach, the program experienced 19 winning seasons and 12 conference or district titles. In 2007, the last baseball game was played on the site of long-time Bob Starcher Field at Malone College.

=== Football ===
Malone University played football continuously between 1993 and 2018. The program began under head coach Joe Palmisano with a 23–23 tie against Bethany (WV) on September 4, 1993. Malone concluded their program with an all-time record of 104 wins, 164 losses, and 2 ties. The last head football coach was Fred Thomas, who coached from 2016 to 2018. He took over the program from Eric Hehman, who held the position from 2009 until 2015. The school disbanded the team in February 2019.

==== Conference titles ====
Year	Conference	Record
1995	Mid-States Football Association Mideast Division	3–0–1
1996	Mid-States Football Association Mideast Division	5–1
1998	Mid-States Football Association Mideast Division	5–1

==== Postseason history ====
NAIA Football Playoffs
Year	Round	Result
1995	Round 1	W 24–23, Geneva
1995	Quarterfinals	L 7–15, Findlay
1998	Round 1	L 41–46, Georgetown (KY)

Victory Bowl
Year	Result	Location
2006	L 28–56, North Greenville	Younts Stadium
2007	W 45–17, Geneva	Reeves Field
2008	L 44–49, Northwestern (MN)	Hubert H. Humphrey Metrodome

=== Track and field/cross country ===
There have been a total of 133 Men's NAIA track and field All-Americans and 17 NAIA national champions. On the woman's side, there have been 59 NAIA All-Americans and two national champions. Both of these totals include indoor and outdoor track and field. Keith Spiva is arguably the most accomplished track and field athlete produced by Malone. He won 4 NAIA national titles and was named an All-American 6 times. He is also the only Malone track and field athlete to win back-to-back national titles in a single event (1989 and 1990 200 meter dash). Christopher Sinick is the most decorated male athlete, with a total of 11 All-American awards in both cross country and track. Combination of track and field with cross-country accomplishments, there have been 69 additional Men's NAIA All-Americans and 28 Woman's NAIA All-Americans. Moreover, Malone has produced one Men's and one Woman's individual cross country national champions.

Christian Dorosario, a member of the Malone Pioneers in the 1970s and school record holder in the mile relay, competed at the 1972 Summer Olympics and 1976 Summer Olympics in the short sprints.

==== National championships ====
Sport	Titles	Assoc.	Division	Year	Opponent/Runner-up	Score
Cross country (men's)	4	NAIA	Single	1972	Occidental	92–169
Cross country (men's)	4	NAIA	Single	2007	Black Hills State	59–202
Cross country (men's)	4	NAIA	Single	2008	Azusa Pacific	61–118
Cross country (men's)	4	NAIA	Single	2009	Concordia Nebraska	44–166
Cross country (women's)	1	NAIA	Single	1999	Spring Arbor	77–160

Malone has won the following national honors:

- NAIA
  - Men's national cross-country champions: 1972, 2007, 2008 and 2009
  - Men's national cross-country runner-up: 1973, 1980, 1989, and 2001
  - Women's national cross-country champions: 1999
  - Women's national cross-country runner-up: 1998
- NCCAA
  - Men's national track & field champions: 1973, 1989, 1991, and 2007
  - Men's national cross-country champions (Division I): 1986–1992, 1994, 1995, 1997–2000, 2002, 2003, 2005, and 2006
  - Women's national track & field champions: 1987–1989, 1999–2002, 2004, and 2005
  - Women's national cross-country champions (Division I): 1986, 1987, 1989, 1990, 1992, 1993, 1997–1999, and 2004

=== Volleyball ===
Women's Volleyball has been played at Malone since 1975 and has amassed nearly 900 all-time wins. The current coach Tanya Hockman has been head of the program since 1999 and has held the position longer than any other volleyball coach at Malone.

The Malone volleyball program has been an extremely successful one through the years, particularly in the mid 1980s and now under Hockman, who has led the team to over 450 wins during her tenure. The 2001 team tied the school record for most wins in a season at 41 and the program also has two AMC titles (2000, 2001) under Hockman.
