= 2018 NCAA Division II cross country championships =

2018 cross-country running meet of the NCAA (Division II)

2018 NCAA Division II Cross Country Championships
- Edition: 61st–Men; 38th–Women
- Date: December 1, 2018
- Host city: (Pennsylvania) Pittsburgh
- Venue: Bob O'Connor Golf Course
- Distances: 10 km–Men; 6 km–Women

The 2018 NCAA Division II Cross Country Championships was the 61st annual NCAA Men's Division II Cross Country Championship and the 38th annual NCAA Women's Division II Cross Country Championship to determine the team and individual national champions of NCAA Division II men's and women's collegiate cross country running in the United States. In all, four different titles were contested: men's and women's individual and team championships. Results were track and field results reporting system. In the men's 10k, Marcelo Laguera of CSU–Pueblo took home the individual title in 31:46.4, while Grand Valley State University won the team title, scoring 89 points and defeating second-placed Colorado School of Mines (99) and third-placed Western Colorado University (117). In the women's 6k, Sarah Berger of the Grand Valley State University won the individual title in 22:07.7, while Grand Valley State University won the team title with 41 points, beating second-placed University of Mary (83) and third-placed Adams State University (90).

== Women's title ==
- Distance: 6,000 meters

=== Women's Team Result (Top 10) ===
PL	Team	Total Time	Average Time	Score	1	2	3	4	5	(6)	(7)
1st place, gold medalist(s)	Grand Valley State	1:53:39	22:43	41	1	5	6	8	21	(90)	(169)
2nd place, silver medalist(s)	UMary	1:55:16	23:03	83	3	10	13	23	34	(40)	(124)
3rd place, bronze medalist(s)	Adams State	1:55:19	23:03	90	2	9	19	27	33	(41)	(99)
4	Western Colorado	1:55:57	23:11	98	4	14	15	28	37	(58)	(59)
5	Colorado Mines	1:59:40	23:56	252	36	42	54	55	65	(67)	(92)
6	Alaska Anchorage	1:59:04	23:48	255	17	18	32	39	149	(187)	(207)
7	Michigan Tech	1:59:39	23:55	288	16	38	45	94	95	(130)	(134)
8	Chico State	2:00:34	24:06	300	44	49	60	69	78	(85)	(109)
9	Simon Fraser	2:00:46	24:09	342	30	46	56	91	119	(157)	(192)
10	Queens (NC)	2:01:52	24:22	418	43	71	80	103	121	(175)	(205)

=== Women's Individual Result (Top 10) ===
Rank	Name	Team	Time
1st place, gold medalist(s)	(United States) Sarah Berger	Grand Valley State	22:07.7
2nd place, silver medalist(s)	(Republic of Ireland) Eilish Flanagan	Adams State	22:12.4
3rd place, bronze medalist(s)	(United States) Emily Roberts	UMary	22:15.5
4	(Poland) Alicja Konieczek	Western Colorado	22:30.4
5	(United States) Allie Ludge	Grand Valley State	22:39.7
6	(Germany) Hanna Gröber	Grand Valley State	22:40.6
7	(Germany) Leah Hanle	Mount Olive	22:50.8
8	(United States) Kayla Wooten	UC-Colorado Springs	22:51.2
9	(United States) Gina Patterson	Grand Valley State	22:53.3
10	(United States) Eileen Stressling	Azusa Pacific	22:54.4

== Men's title ==
- Distance: 10,000 meters

=== Men's Team Result (Top 10) ===
PL	Team	Total Time	Average Time	Score	1	2	3	4	5	(6)	(7)
1st place, gold medalist(s)	Grand Valley State	2:44:10	32:50	89	2	6	20	24	37	(48)	(217)
2nd place, silver medalist(s)	Colorado Mines	2:45:09	33:01	99	9	14	16	27	33	(54)	(55)
3rd place, bronze medalist(s)	Western Colorado	2:45:38	33:07	117	5	12	28	34	38	(56)	(67)
4	Adams State	2:46:53	33:22	175	3	11	36	57	68	(85)	(101)
5	Sioux Falls	2:48:35	33:43	214	7	40	41	50	76	(122)	(176)
6	Saginaw Valley	2:48:29	33:41	226	15	23	42	58	88	(128)	(156)
7	Chico State	2:48:58	33:47	230	30	31	32	66	71	(105)	(106)
8	Alaska Anchorage	2:49:46	33:57	279	8	43	53	65	110	(136)	(148)
9	Queens (NC)	2:50:11	34:02	288	19	45	64	74	86	(98)	
10	Augustana (SD)	2:51:19	34:15	328	46	60	61	70	91	(147)	(173)

=== Men's Individual Result (Top 10) ===
Rank	Name	Team	Time
1st place, gold medalist(s)	(Mexico) Marcelo Laguera	CSU–Pueblo	31:46.4
2nd place, silver medalist(s)	(United States) Zach Panning	Grand Valley State	31:53.6
3rd place, bronze medalist(s)	(United States) Elias Gedyon	Adams State	32:05.1
4	(Kenya) Gidieon Kimutai	Missouri Southern	32:11.7
5	(United States) Taylor Stack	Western Colorado	32:18.0
6	(United States) Enael Woldemichae	Grand Valley State	32:26.4
7	(United States) Mason Phillips	Sioux Falls	32:27.3
8	(United States) Luke Greer	Carson–Newman	32:31.2
9	(Kenya) Wesley Kirui	Alaska Anchorage	32:35.1
10	(United States) Josh Hoskinson	Colorado Mines	32:38.0

== See also ==
- NCAA Men's Division I Cross Country Championship
- NCAA Women's Division I Cross Country Championship
- NCAA Men's Division II Cross Country Championship
- NCAA Women's Division II Cross Country Championship
- NCAA Men's Division III Cross Country Championship
- NCAA Women's Division III Cross Country Championship
