= 2019 NCAA Division II cross country championships =

2019 cross-country running meet of the NCAA (Division II)

2019 NCAA Division II Cross Country Championships
- Edition: 62nd–Men; 39th–Women
- Date: November 23, 2019
- Host city: Sacramento, California
- Venue: Arcade Creek Cross Country Course
- Distances: 10 km–Men; 6 km–Women

The 2019 NCAA Division II Cross Country Championships was the 62nd annual NCAA Men's Division II Cross Country Championship and the 39th annual NCAA Women's Division II Cross Country Championship to determine the team and individual national champions of NCAA Division II men's and women's collegiate cross country running in the United States. In all, four different titles were contested: men's and women's individual and team championships. Results were track and field results reporting system. In the men's 10k, Ezra Mutai of American International College took home the individual title in 29:31.2, while Colorado School of Mines won the team title, scoring 57 points and defeating second-placed Adams State University (136) and third-placed California State University, Chico (143). In the women's 6k, Stephanie Cotter of the Adams State University won the individual title in 19:15.5, while Adams State University won the team title with 23 points, beating second-placed Grand Valley State University (87) and third-placed Colorado School of Mines (133).

== Women's title ==
- Distance: 6,000 meters

=== Women's Team Result (Top 10) ===
PL	Team	Total Time	Average Time	Score	1	2	3	4	5	(6)	(7)
1st place, gold medalist(s)	Adams State	1:39:29	19:53	23	1	2	3	6	11	(22)	(27)
2nd place, silver medalist(s)	Grand Valley State	1:43:39	20:43	87	10	12	16	21	28	(36)	(60)
3rd place, bronze medalist(s)	Colorado Mines	1:44:18	20:51	133	7	14	17	38	57	(79)	(90)
4	Western Colorado	1:45:29	21:05	192	31	34	37	39	51	(54)	(84)
5	UMary	1:45:32	21:06	233	4	30	56	70	73	(75)	(91)
6	Augustana (SD)	1:46:14	21:14	234	35	42	49	53	55	(58)	(64)
7	Chico State	1:47:16	21:27	319	48	52	65	69	85	(104)	(168)
8	Alaska Anchorage	1:47:03	21:24	374	5	8	82	137	142	(229)	(235)
9	Cal State East Bay	1:47:47	21:33	380	26	47	66	117	124	(187)	(220)
10	Walsh	1:47:59	21:35	380	26	47	66	117	124	(187)	(220)

=== Women's Individual Result (Top 10) ===
Rank	Name	Team	Time
1st place, gold medalist(s)	(Republic of Ireland) Stephanie Cotter	Adams State	19:15.5
2nd place, silver medalist(s)	(Republic of Ireland) Eilish Flanagan	Adams State	19:39.0
3rd place, bronze medalist(s)	(Republic of Ireland) Roisin Flanagan	Adams State	19:39.3
4	(Norway) Ida Narbuvoll	UMary	20:12.1
5	(Kenya) Emmanuelah Chelimo	Alaska Anchorage	20:18.3
6	(United States) HaLeigh Hunter-Galvan	Adams State	20:19.2
7	(United States) Chloe Cook	Colorado Mines	20:24.0
8	(United States) Billie Hatch	Dixie State	20:26.1
9	(United States) Lauren Bailey	UIndy	20:27.9
10	(Kenya) Nancy Jeptoo	Alaska Anchorage	20:30.2

== Men's title ==
- Distance: 10,000 meters

=== Men's Team Result (Top 10) ===
PL	Team	Total Time	Average Time	Score	1	2	3	4	5	(6)	(7)
1st place, gold medalist(s)	Colorado Mines	2:30:31	30:06	57	4	7	13	16	17	(30)	(78)
2nd place, silver medalist(s)	Adams State	2:32:43	30:32	136	2	9	28	44	53	(125)	(128)
3rd place, bronze medalist(s)	Chico State	2:33:22	30:40	143	22	25	26	33	37	(41)	(116)
4	Grand Valley State	2:33:47	30:45	177	20	23	27	42	65	(85)	(93)
5	Northwest Missouri State	2:33:41	30:44	206	6	8	32	56	104	(221)	(225)
6	Augustana (SD)	2:34:28	30:53	225	14	21	54	60	76	(123)	(159)
7	Western Colorado	2:34:38	30:55	273	3	10	71	90	99	(131)	(207)
8	Queens (NC)	2:35:39	31:07	280	29	31	63	70	87	(166)	(188)
9	Augusta	2:36:38	31:19	332	39	47	66	74	106	(194)	
10	West Texas A&M	2:36:23	31:16	351	11	57	80	96	107	(180)	

=== Men's Individual Result (Top 10) ===
Rank	Name	Team	Time
1st place, gold medalist(s)	(Kenya) Ezra Mutai	American International	29:31.2
2nd place, silver medalist(s)	(Australia) Kale Adams	Adams State	29:43.9
3rd place, bronze medalist(s)	(United States) Taylor Stack	Western Colorado	29:47.6
4	(United States) Kyle Moran	Colorado Mines	29:49.9
5	(Kenya) Gidieon Kimutai	Missouri Southern	29:49.9
6	(Spain) Karim Achengli	Northwest Missouri State	29:52.5
7	(United States) Dylan Ko	Colorado Mines	29:54.3
8	(Kenya) Joshua Chepkesir	UNC Pembroke	29:55.9
9	(Peru) Jhordan Ccope	Northwest Missouri State	30:04.1
10	(United States) Carson Bix	Adams State	30:05.8

== See also ==
- NCAA Men's Division I Cross Country Championship
- NCAA Women's Division I Cross Country Championship
- NCAA Men's Division II Cross Country Championship
- NCAA Women's Division II Cross Country Championship
- NCAA Men's Division III Cross Country Championship
- NCAA Women's Division III Cross Country Championship
