= 2021 NCAA Division II cross country championships =

2021 cross-country running meet of the NCAA (Division II)

2021 NCAA Division II Cross Country Championships
- Edition: 63rd–Men; 40th–Women
- Date: November 20, 2021
- Host city: Saint Leo, Florida
- Venue: Abbey Golf Course
- Distances: 10 km–Men; 6 km–Women

The 2021 NCAA Division II Cross Country Championships was the 63rd annual NCAA Men's Division II Cross Country Championship and the 40th annual NCAA Women's Division II Cross Country Championship to determine the team and individual national champions of NCAA Division II men's and women's collegiate cross country running in the United States. In all, four different titles were contested: men's and women's individual and team championships. Results were track and field results reporting system.

In the men's 10k, Isaac Harding of Grand Valley State took home the individual title in 29:58.3, leading Grand Valley State Lakers men's cross country to win the team title, scoring 43 points and defeating second-placed Adams State University (84) and third-placed Colorado Mines (123). In the women's 6k, Hannah Becker of the Grand Valley State won the individual title in 20:22.0, while Adams State University won the team title with 59 points, beating second-placed Grand Valley State University (79) and third-placed Augustana (SD) (118).

== Women's title ==
- Distance: 6,000 meters

=== Women's Team Result (Top 10) ===
PL	Team	Total Time	Average Time	Score	1	2	3	4	5	(6)	(7)
1st place, gold medalist(s)	Adams State	1:44:43	20:56	6	9	10	14	20	(30)	(41)	
2nd place, silver medalist(s)	Grand Valley State	1:44:38	20:55	79	1	2	13	31	32	(38)	(71)
3rd place, bronze medalist(s)	Augustana (SD)	1:46:10	21:14	118	7	19	24	28	40	(48)	(63)
4	Colorado School of Mines	1:47:38	21:31	197	21	22	42	54	58	(61)	(97)
5	Wingate	1:47:25	21:29	208	5	35	39	55	74	(125)	(191)
6	Queens (N.C.)	1:47:51	21:34	254	3	15	45	46	145	(155)	(160)
7	UC Colorado Springs	1:48:36	21:43	263	11	34	70	72	76	(132)	(161)
8	Lee (Tenn)	1:48:38	21:43	297	4	17	84	92	100	(105)	(113)
9	Western Colorado	1:49:29	21:53	321	25	33	66	83	114	(126)	(180)
10	U-Mary	1:49:55	21:59	353	16	67	69	81	120	(133)	(152)

=== Women's Individual Result (Top 10) ===
Rank	Name	Team	Time
1st place, gold medalist(s)	(United States) Hannah Becker	Grand Valley State	20:22.0
2nd place, silver medalist(s)	(United States) Klaudia O'Malley	Grand Valley State	20:26.9
3rd place, bronze medalist(s)	(Mexico) Fatima Alanis	Queens (N.C.)	20:28.1
4	(Germany) Celine Ritter	Lee (Tenn)	20:30.5
5	(South Africa) Lara Orrock	Wingate	20:35.8
6	(United States) Brianna Robles	Adams State	20:36.3
7	(United States) Lindsay Cunningham	Winona State	20:44.8
8	(United States) Megan Means	Augustana (SD)	20:46.2
9	(United States) Florance Uwajeneza	West Texas A&M	20:46.6
10	(Germany) Franziska Althaus	Adams State	20:55.1

== Men's title ==
- Distance: 10,000 meters

=== Men's Team Result (Top 10) ===
PL	Team	Total Time	Average Time	Score	1	2	3	4	5	(6)	(7)
1st place, gold medalist(s)	Grand Valley State	2:32:39	30:31	43	1	2	10	12	18	(41)	(68)
2nd place, silver medalist(s)	Adams State										
3rd place, bronze medalist(s)	Colorado Mines										
4	Augustana (SD)										
5	UC Colorado Springs										
6	Wingate										
7	Western Colorado										
8	Chico State										
9	Lewis										
10	Colorado Christian										

== See also ==
- NCAA Men's Division I Cross Country Championship
- NCAA Women's Division I Cross Country Championship
- NCAA Men's Division II Cross Country Championship
- NCAA Women's Division II Cross Country Championship
- NCAA Men's Division III Cross Country Championship
- NCAA Women's Division III Cross Country Championship
