= NCAA Division II women's cross country championships =

American collegiate cross country tournament

- Current season, competition or edition: 2025 NCAA Division II women's cross country championships
- Association: NCAA
- Sport: Cross country
- Founded: 1981; 45 years ago
- Division: Division II
- No. of teams: 34
- Country: United States; Canada
- Most recent champions: Team: Grand Valley State (8th); Individual: Tristian Spence, Adams State
- Most titles: Team: Adams State (21)
- Website: NCAA.com

The NCAA Division II women's cross country championships are contested at an annual meet hosted by the NCAA to determine the team and individual national champions of women's collegiate cross country running among its Division II members in the United States and Canada.

The championships have been held every November since the NCAA began sponsoring women's sports in 1981 and are now held at the same time and location as the NCAA Division II men's cross country championships.

Adams State have been the most successful program, with 21 national titles.

The defending national teams champions are Grand Valley State, who won their eighth national title in 2025 in this sport.

Tristian Spence, representing Adams State, is the reigning individual champion.

== Format ==
The race field included 8 teams in 1981, 11 teams from 1982 to 1992 and 17 teams from 1993 to 1999. Beginning in 2000, the national championship race has included 24 teams. Teams compete in one of eight regional championships to qualify. In addition to the 24 teams, 16 individual runners qualify for the national championship.

== Results ==
- The race distance was 5,000 meters (5 kilometers) from 1981 to 1997 and 6,000 meters (6 kilometers) from 1997 to the present.

NCAA Division II Women's Cross Country Championship
Year	Site (Host Team)	Championship Results				Individual Championship	
Year	Site (Host Team)	Champion	Points	Runner-up	Points	Winner (Team)	Time
1981; Details	Cape Girardeau, MO (Southeast Missouri State)	South Dakota State	26	Cal Poly	49	Eileen Kraemer (Cal Poly)	17:41.00†
1982; Details	St. Cloud, MN (St. Cloud State)	Cal Poly	32	South Dakota State	45	Amy Harper (Cal Poly)	21:13.60
1983; Details	Somers, WI (Wisconsin–Parkside)	Cal Poly (2)	48	Holy Cross	92	Amy Harper (Cal Poly)	17:10.00†
1984; Details	Clinton, MS (Mississippi College)	Cal Poly (3)	32	South Dakota State	107	Christine Ridenour (Southeast Missouri State)	16:53.20†
1985; Details	East Stroudsburg, PA (East Stroudsburg)	Cal Poly (4)	30	Cal State Northridge	86	Bente Moe (Seattle Pacific)	17:42.20
1986; Details	Riverside, CA (UC Riverside)	Cal Poly (5)	39	Cal State Northridge	93	Gladees Prieur (Cal Poly)	16:43.00
1987; Details	Evansville, IN (Southern Indiana)	Cal Poly (6)	53	Cal State Los Angeles	84	Sylvia Mosqueda (Cal State Los Angeles)	16:57.00
1988; Details	Clinton, MS (Mississippi College)	Cal Poly (7)	49	Air Force	51	Laura Byrne (Southeast Missouri State)	16:56.80
1989; Details	East Stroudsburg, PA (East Stroudsburg)	Cal Poly (8)	34	Air Force	67	Darcy Arreola (Cal State Northridge)	17:14.20
1990; Details	Arcata, CA (Humboldt State)	Cal Poly (9)	61	Air Force	78	Callie Calhoun (Air Force)	16:56.60
1991; Details	Edwardsville, IL (SIU Edwardsville)	Cal Poly (10)	60	UC Davis	93	Christie Allen (Pittsburg State)	18:04.00
1992; Details	Slippery Rock, PA (Slippery Rock)	Adams State	64	Western State Colorado	99	Christie Allen (Pittsburg State)	18:18.00
1993; Details	Riverside, CA (UC Riverside)	Adams State (2)	75	Cal Poly	106	Elva Dryer (Western State)	17:34.40
1994; Details	Kearney, NE (Nebraska–Kearney)	Adams State (3)	47	Western State Colorado	55	Elva Dryer (Western State)	17:20.90
1995; Details	Spartanburg, SC (USC Spartanburg)	Adams State (4)	62	Abilene Christian	143	Tumaini Urio (Western State)	16:54.85
1996; Details	Arcata, CA (Humboldt State)	Adams State (5)	35	Western State Colorado	94	Denise Summers (Adams State)	17:46.80
1997; Details	Somers, WI (Wisconsin–Parkside)	Adams State (6)	37	Lewis; Western State Colorado	106	Kasia Arient (Lewis)	17:31.20
The race distance changes from 5 kilometers to 6 kilometers
1998; Details	Lawrence, KS (Kansas)	Adams State (7)	56	Western State Colorado	79	Kimberly Bugg (Adams State)	21:43.00†
1999; Details	Joplin, MO (Missouri Southern State)	Adams State (8)	23	Western State Colorado	47	Marjo Venalainen (Kennesaw State)	20:48.20†
2000; Details	Pomona, CA (Cal Poly Pomona)	Western State Colorado	38	North Dakota	131	Marjo Venalainen (Kennesaw State)	21:33.60
2001; Details	Slippery Rock, PA (Slippery Rock)	Western State Colorado (2)	46	Adams State	55	Hannah Lawrence (Western State)	21:24.70
2002; Details	Ashland, OH (Cal Poly Pomona)	Western State Colorado (3)	43	Adams State	46	Amber Klein (Adams State)	20:54.50
2003; Details	Cary, NC	Adams State (9)	38	Western State Colorado	101	Chelsea Smith (BYU Hawaii)	20:33.90†
2004; Details	Evansville, IN (Southern Indiana)	Adams State (10)	31	Edinboro	101	Chelsea Smith (BYU Hawaii)	21:33.00
2005; Details	Pomona, CA (Cal Poly Pomona)	Adams State (11)	54	Grand Valley State	69	Mandi Zemba (Grand Valley State)	21:01.70
2006; Details	Pensacola, FL	Adams State (12)	94	Western State Colorado	101	Esther Komen (Western State)	20:09.40†
2007; Details	Joplin, MO (Missouri Southern State)	Adams State (13)	63	Seattle Pacific	178	Jessica Pixler (Seattle Pacific)	20:29.10
2008; Details	Slippery Rock, PA (Slippery Rock)	Adams State (14)	79	Grand Valley State	102	Jessica Pixler (Seattle Pacific)	20:59.00
2009; Details	Evansville, IN (Southern Indiana)	Adams State (15)	73	Grand Valley State	81	Jessica Pixler (Seattle Pacific)	20:22.60
2010; Details	Louisville, KY (Bellarmine)	Grand Valley State	66	Western State Colorado	95	Neely Spence (Shippensburg)	20:41.20
2011; Details	Spokane, WA	Augustana (SD)	75	Western State Colorado	79	Neely Spence (Shippensburg)	20:53.80
2012; Details	Joplin, MO (Missouri Southern State)	Grand Valley State (2)	101	Augustana (SD)	104	Alicia Nelson (Adams State)	20:03.30
2013; Details	Spokane, WA	Grand Valley State (3)	54	Adams State	91	Jennifer Agnew (Mary)	20:50.70
2014; Details	Louisville, KY (Bellarmine)	Grand Valley State (4)	50	Hillsdale	115	Kendra Foley (Grand Valley State)	21:05.80
2015; Details	Joplin, MO (Missouri Southern State)	Adams State (16)	83	Grand Valley State	97	Alexis Zeis (U-Mary)	20:03.4
2016; Details	Tampa, FL (Saint Leo)	Grand Valley State (5)	116	Adams State	139	Kendra Foley (Grand Valley State)	20:01.8
2017; Details	Evansville, IN (Southern Indiana)	Adams State (17)	126	Mary (ND)	137	Caroline Kurgat (Alaska Anchorage)	20:32.3
2018; Details	Pittsburgh, PA (Clarion)	Grand Valley State (6)	41	Mary (ND)	83	Sarah Berger (Grand Valley State)	22:07.7
2019; Details	Sacramento, CA (CSU, Sacramento)	Adams State (18)	23	Grand Valley State	87	Stephanie Cotter (Adams State)	19:15.5
2020	Evansville, IN (Southern Indiana)	Cancelled due to the COVID-19 pandemic in the United States					
2021; Details	Tampa, FL	Adams State (19)	59	Grand Valley State	79	Hannah Becker (Grand Valley State)	20:22.0
2022; Details	Seattle, WA (Seattle Pacific)	Adams State (20)	75	Grand Valley State	126	Stephanie Cotter (Adams State)	19:45.2
2023; Details	Joplin, MO (Missouri Southern State)	Grand Valley State (7)	59	Adams State	86	Lindsay Cunningham (Winona State)	19:30.1
2024; Details	Sacramento, CA	Adams State (21)	61	West Texas A&M	127	Lauren Kiley (Grand Valley State)	20:28.5
2025; Details	Kenosha, WI (Wisconsin–Parkside)	Grand Valley State (8)	65	Colorado Mines	69	Tristian Spence (Adams State)	20:11.0
2026	Lawrence, KS						
2027	Huntsville, AL						

- A † indicates a then-NCAA record-setting time for that particular distance.
- A time highlighted in ██ indicates the all-time NCAA championship record for that distance.

== Champions ==
Team national championships, by school: 21, 10, 8, 3, 1

=== Team titles ===
School	Titles	Years
Adams State	21	1992, 1993, 1994, 1995, 1996, 1997, 1998, 1999, 2003, 2004, 2005, 2006, 2007, 2008, 2009, 2015, 2017, 2019, 2021, 2022, 2024
Grand Valley State	8	2010, 2012, 2013, 2014, 2016, 2018, 2023, 2025
Western Colorado	3	2000, 2001, 2002
Augustana (SD)	1	2011

==== Former programs ====
School	Titles	Years
Cal Poly	10	1982, 1983, 1984, 1985, 1986, 1987, 1988, 1989, 1990, 1991
South Dakota State	1	1981

- Schools in italics reclassified athletics from NCAA Division II.

== See also ==
- NCAA Women's Cross Country Championships (Division I, Division III)
- NCAA Men's Cross Country Championships (Division I, Division II, Division III)
- AIAW Intercollegiate Women's Cross Country Champions
- NAIA Cross Country Championships (Men, Women)
