= NCAA Division II men's cross country championships =

- Current season, competition or edition: 2025 NCAA Division II men's cross country championships
- Association: NCAA
- Sport: Cross country
- Founded: 1958; 68 years ago
- Division: Division II
- Country: United States; Canada
- Most recent champion: Team: Wingate (2nd)
- Most titles: Team: Adams State (13)
- Website: NCAA.com

The NCAA Division II men's cross country championships (previously the NCAA College Division cross country championships, from 1958 to 1973) are contested at an annual meet organized by the NCAA to determine the team and individual national champions of men's collegiate cross country running among its Division II members in the United States and Canada. It has been held every fall, usually in November, since breaking off from the NCAA University Division Men's Cross Country Championships in 1958.

Initially created for cross country programs from smaller universities and colleges, a third championship, the NCAA Division III men's cross country championships, split away in 1973 when the NCAA created its current three-division structure.

Adams State have been the most successful program, with 13 national titles.

The defending national teams champions are Wingate, who won their second national title in 2025.

Adams State's Kidus Begashaw is the reigning individual champion.

== Format ==
The field for the championship race has ranged in size from a low of 11 teams in 1959 to a high of 59 teams in 1972. From 1983 to 1999 the field was fixed at 17 teams. Beginning in 2000, the national championship race has included 24 teams. Teams compete in one of eight regional championships to qualify. In addition to the 24 teams, 16 individual runners qualify for the national championship.

The race distance from 1958 to 1967 was 4 miles (6.4 km). From 1968 to 1975 the race distance was 5 miles (8.0 km). Since 1976 the race distance has been 10,000 meters (6.2 mi)

The event record for the 10,000 meter distance is 28:04.00, set by Shane Healy of Adams State Grizzlies in 1994.

== Results ==
- The race distance was 4 miles from 1958 to 1967, 5 miles from 1968 to 1975, and 10,000 meters (10 kilometers) from 1976 to the present.

NCAA Division II Men's Cross Country Championship (NCAA College Division Men's Cross Country Championship, 1958–1973)
Year	Site (Host Team)	Championship Results				Individual Championship	
Year	Site (Host Team)	Champion	Points	Runner-up	Points	Winner (Team)	Time
1958; Details	Wheaton, IL (Wheaton)	Northern Illinois	90	South Dakota State	93	Paul Whiteley (Emporia State)	20:45.0†
1959; Details	Wheaton, IL (Wheaton)	South Dakota State	67	Emporia State	75	Paul Whiteley (Emporia State)	23:01.6
1960; Details	Wheaton, IL (Wheaton)	Central State (OH)	72	Mankato State	109	John Mulholland (Loras)	20:28.3†
1961; Details	Wheaton, IL (Wheaton)	Southern Illinois	33	South Dakota State	82	John Mulholland (Loras)	20:06.0†
1962; Details	Wheaton, IL (Wheaton)	Central State (OH) (2)	77	Northern Illinois	96	Leslie Hegedus (Central State–OH)	19:59.1†
1963; Details	Wheaton, IL (Wheaton)	Emporia State	44	Akron	174	John Camien (Emporia State)	19:16.9
1964; Details	Wheaton, IL (Wheaton)	Kentucky State	95	Northeast Missouri State	105	Ed Schneider (Northeast Missouri State)	19:43.9
1965; Details	Wheaton, IL (Wheaton)	San Diego State	55	Eastern Michigan	164	Gene Takle (Luther)	19:38.9
1966; Details	Wheaton, IL (Wheaton)	San Diego State (2)	58	Western Illinois	184	Bob Fitts (Cortland State)	19:40.6
1967; Details	Wheaton, IL (Wheaton)	San Diego State (3)	66	Cal Poly Pomona	133	Arjan Gelling (North Dakota)	19:33.5
The race distance changes from 4 miles to 5 miles
1968; Details	Wheaton, IL (Wheaton)	Eastern Illinois	99	Mankato State	130	Dave Robbins (Portland State)	25:14.00†
1969; Details	Wheaton, IL (Wheaton)	Eastern Illinois (2)	84	Eastern Michigan	146	Ron Stonitsch (C.W. Post)	24:53.00†
1970; Details	Wheaton, IL (Wheaton)	Eastern Michigan	100	Cal State Fullerton	124	Mark Covert (Cal State Fullerton)	25:13.00
1971; Details	Wheaton, IL (Wheaton)	Cal State Fullerton	147	North Dakota State	81	Mike Slack (North Dakota State)	24:19.00†
1972; Details	Wheaton, IL (Wheaton)	North Dakota State	84	South Dakota State	143	Mike Slack (North Dakota State)	24:36.00
1973; Details	Wheaton, IL (Wheaton)	South Dakota State (2)	88	Southwest Missouri State	93	Garry Bentley (South Dakota State)	23:49.00†
1974; Details	Springfield, MO (Southwest Missouri State)	Southwest Missouri State	112	South Dakota State	130	Garry Bentley (South Dakota State)	23:33.80
1975; Details	Northridge, CA (Cal State Northridge)	UC Irvine	59	Cal State Northridge	91	Ralph Serna (UC Irvine)	23:40.6
The race distance changes from 5 miles to 10,000 meters
1976; Details	Springfield, MO (Southwest Missouri State)	UC Irvine (2)	50	Southwest Missouri State	73	Ralph Serna (UC Irvine)	29:42.00†
1977; Details	Chicago, IL (Illinois–Chicago)	Eastern Illinois (3)	37	South Dakota State	151	Michael Bollman (North Dakota State)	30:08.70
1978; Details	Indiana, PA (Indiana of Pennsylvania)	Cal Poly	42	South Dakota State	165	James Schankel (Cal Poly)	30:34.00
1979; Details	Riverside, CA (UC Riverside)	Cal Poly (2)	45	Sacramento State	108	James Schankel (Cal Poly)	29:43.00
1980; Details	Somers, WI (Wisconsin–Parkside)	Humboldt State	115	UNC Pembroke	120	Garry Henry (UNC Pembroke)	29:32.00†
1981; Details	Lowell, MA (Lowell)	Millersville	97	Edinboro	99	Mark Conover (Humboldt State)	31:45.70
1982; Details	St. Cloud, MN (St. Cloud State)	Eastern Washington	84	South Dakota State	123	Greg Beardsley (Edinboro)	36:49.80
1983; Details	Somers, WI (Wisconsin–Parkside)	Cal Poly Pomona	86	St. Cloud State	100	Brian Ferrari (California–PA)	30:38.20
1984; Details	Clinton, MS (Mississippi College)	Southeast Missouri State	87	Edinboro	129	Michael Vanatta (Southeast Missouri State)	29:55.00
1985; Details	East Stroudsburg, PA (East Stroudsburg)	South Dakota State (3)	60	Edinboro	108	Samson Obwocha (East Texas State)	30:49.40
1986; Details	Riverside, CA (UC Riverside)	Edinboro	56	South Dakota State	79	Samson Obwocha (East Texas State)	30:52.00
1987; Details	Evansville, IN (Southern Indiana)	Edinboro (2)	95	Mankato State	113	Charles Cheruiyot (Mount St. Mary's)	30:42.00
1988; Details	Clinton, MS (Mississippi College)	Edinboro (3) & Mankato State	77	South Dakota State		Doug Hanson (North Dakota State)	29:47.00
1989; Details	East Stroudsburg, PA (East Stroudsburg)	South Dakota State (4)	97	Edinboro	102	Rob Edson (Keene State)	31:44.90
1990; Details	Arcata, CA (Humboldt State)	Edinboro (4)	50	Shippensburg	125	Doug Hanson (North Dakota State)	29:18.80†
1991; Details	Edwardsville, IL (SIU Edwardsville)	UMass Lowell	48	Nebraska–Kearney	96	Martin Lyons (Edinboro)	31:29.00
1992; Details	Slippery Rock, PA (Slippery Rock)	Adams State	15	Western State	56	Phillip Castillo (Adams State)	32:24.00
1993; Details	Riverside, CA (UC Riverside)	Adams State (2)	25	Edinboro	103	Shane Healy (Adams State)	28:04.00
1994; Details	Kearney, NE (Nebraska–Kearney)	Adams State (3)	55	Western State	73	Charles Mulinga (Lewis)	30:59.90
1995; Details	Spartanburg, SC (USC Upstate)	Western State	69	Central Missouri State	98	Charles Mulinga (Lewis)	30:20.12
1996; Details	Arcata, CA (Humboldt State)	South Dakota State (5)	119	Lewis	142	Alexandr Alexin (Central Missouri State)	31:23.60
1997; Details	Somers, WI (Wisconsin–Parkside)	South Dakota	78	Central Missouri State	83	Elly Rono (Southern Indiana)	31:13.90
1998; Details	Lawrence, KS (Kansas)	Adams State (4)	68	Western State	74	Yi Min Wu (Edinboro)	31:06.60
1999; Details	Joplin, MO (Missouri Southern State)	Western State (2)	27	Adams State	95	Michael Aish (Western State)	29:19.00
2000; Details	Pomona, CA (Cal Poly Pomona)	Western State (3)	29	Abilene Christian	62	Alfred Rugema (Abilene Christian)	30:17.00
2001; Details	Slippery Rock, PA (Slippery Rock)	Western State (4)	38	Abilene Christian	74	Michael Aish (Western State)	30:52.60
2002; Details	Ashland, OH (Cal Poly Pomona)	Western State (5)	35	Abilene Christian	81	Alfred Rugema (Abilene Christian)	30:43.70
2003; Details	Cary, NC	Adams State (5)	40	Abilene Christian	68	Celedonio Rodriguez (Adams State)	30:25.60
2004; Details	Evansville, IN (Southern Indiana)	Western State (6)	39	Adams State	76	Nicodemus Naimadu (Abilene Christian)	31:38.10
2005; Details	Pomona, CA (Cal Poly Pomona)	Western State (7)	51	Adams State	108	Nicodemus Naimadu (Abilene Christian)	30:13.80
2006; Details	Pensacola, FL	Abilene Christian	57	Adams State	70	Nicodemus Naimadu (Abilene Christian)	29:17.50
2007; Details	Joplin, MO (Missouri Southern State)	Abilene Christian (2)	59	Adams State & Western State	66	Nicodemus Naimadu (Abilene Christian)	29:37.70
2008; Details	Slippery Rock, PA (Slippery Rock)	Adams State (6)	67	Western State	88	Scott Bauhs (Chico State)	30:23.00
2009; Details	Evansville, IN (Southern Indiana)	Adams State (7)	23	Western State	86	Reuben Mwei (Adams State)	30:27.80
2010; Details	Louisville, KY (Bellarmine)	Adams State (8)	57	Western State	102	Michael Crouch (Queens–NC)	30:43.20
2011; Details	Spokane, WA	Western State (8)	27	Adams State	69	Ryan Haebe (Western State)	30:45.10
2012; Details	Joplin, MO (Missouri Southern State)	Adams State (9)	34	Colorado Mines	102	Micah Chelimo (Alaska–Anchorage)	28:56.60
2013; Details	Spokane, WA	Adams State (10)	54	Grand Valley State	104	Tabor Stevens (Adams State)	29:50.10
2014; Details	Louisville, KY (Bellarmine)	Adams State (11)	69	Grand Valley State	127	Tabor Stevens (Adams State)	30:02.00
2015; Details	Joplin, MO (Missouri Southern State)	Colorado Mines	100	Adams State	127	Alfred Chelanga (Shorter)	29:24.6
2016; Details	Tampa, FL (Saint Leo)	Adams State (12)	54	Grand Valley State	79	Vincent Kiprop (Missouri Southern)	29:07.4
2017; Details	Evansville, IN (Southern Indiana)	Adams State (13)	44	Grand Valley State	64	James Ngandu (Tiffin)	30:18.8
2018; Details	Pittsburgh, PA (Clarion)	Grand Valley State	89	Colorado Mines	99	Marcelo Laguera (CSU-Pueblo)	31:46.4
2019; Details	Joplin, MO (Missouri Southern State)	Colorado Mines (2)	57	Adams State	136	Ezra Mutai (American Int'l)	29:31.2
2020; Details	Evansville, IN (Southern Indiana)	Cancelled due to the COVID-19 pandemic in the United States					
2021; Details	Tampa, FL	Grand Valley State (2)	43	Adams State	84	Isaac Harding (Grand Valley State)	29:58.3
2022; Details	Seattle, WA (Seattle Pacific)	Colorado Mines (3)	43	Wingate	177	Dillon Powell (Colorado Mines)	29:28.0
2023; Details	Joplin, MO (Missouri Southern State)	Wingate	70	Colorado Mines	79	William Amponsah (West Texas A&M)	29:04.3
2024; Details	Sacramento, CA	Colorado Mines (4)	63	Wingate	66	William Amponsah (West Texas A&M)	29:40.8
2025; Details	Kenosha, WI (Wisconsin–Parkside)	Wingate (2)	62	Adams State	71	Kidus Begashaw (Adams State)	29:38.8

- A † indicates a then-NCAA record-setting time for that particular distance.
- A time highlighted in ██ indicates the all-time NCAA championship record for that distance.

== Champions ==
=== Team titles ===
Team national championships, by school: 13, 8, 5, 4, 3, 2, 1

Team	Titles	Years
Adams State	13	1992, 1993, 1994, 1998, 2003, 2008, 2009, 2010, 2012, 2013, 2014, 2016, 2017
Western Colorado	8	1995, 1999, 2000, 2001, 2002, 2004, 2005, 2011
Colorado Mines	4	2015, 2019, 2022, 2024
Edinboro	4	1986, 1987, 1988, 1990
Central State (OH)	2	1960, 1962
Grand Valley State	2	2018, 2021
Wingate	2	2023, 2025
Cal Poly Pomona	1	1983
Cal Poly Humboldt	1	1980
Emporia State	1	1963
Kentucky State	1	1964
Millersville	1	1981
Minnesota State	1	1988

==== Former Division II ====
Team	Titles	Years
South Dakota State	5	1959, 1973, 1985, 1989, 1996
Eastern Illinois	3	1968, 1969, 1977
San Diego State	3	1965, 1966, 1967
Abilene Christian	2	2006, 2007
UC Irvine	2	1975, 1976
Cal Poly	2	1978, 1979
Cal State Fullerton	1	1971
Eastern Michigan	1	1970
Eastern Washington	1	1982
UMass Lowell	1	1991
Missouri State	1	1974
North Dakota State	1	1972
Northern Illinois	1	1958
South Dakota	1	1997
Southeast Missouri State	1	1984

=== Individual titles by team ===
Rank	Team	Titles	Years
1	Adams State	7	1992, 1993, 2003, 2009, 2013, 2014
2	Abilene Christian	6	2000, 2002, 2004, 2005, 2006, 2007
3	North Dakota State	5	1971, 1972, 1977, 1988, 1990
4	West Texas A&M	3	1964, 2023, 2024
4	Edinboro	3	1982, 1991, 1998
4	Emporia State	3	1958, 1959, 1963
4	Western Colorado	3	1999, 2001, 2011
5	UC Irvine	2	1975, 1976
5	Cal Poly	2	1978, 1979
5	Lewis	2	1994, 1995
5	Loras	2	1960, 1961
5	South Dakota State	2	1973, 1974
5	East Texas A&M	2	1985, 1986
6	Alaska Anchorage	1	2012
6	American International	1	2019
6	Chico State	1	2008
6	Cal State Fullerton	1	1970
6	California (PA)	1	1983
6	Central Missouri	1	1996
6	Central State (OH)	1	1962
6	Colorado Mines	1	2022
6	CSU Pueblo	1	2018
6	Cortland	1	1966
6	Grand Valley State	1	2021
6	Cal Poly Humboldt	1	1981
6	Keene State	1	1989
6	LIU Post	1	1969
6	Luther	1	1965
6	Missouri Southern	1	2016
6	Mount St. Mary's	1	1987
6	UNC Pembroke	1	1980
6	North Dakota	1	1967
6	Portland State	1	1968
6	Queens (NC)	1	2010
6	Shorter	1	2015
6	Southeast Missouri State	1	1984
6	Southern Indiana	1	1997
6	Tiffin	1	2017
6	Truman	1	1964

=== Individual titles by runner ===
Rank	Runner	Team	Titles	Years
1	Nicodemus Naimadu	Abilene Christian	4	2004, 2005, 2006, 2007
2	Paul Whiteley	Emporia State	2	1958, 1959
2	John Mulholland	Loras	2	1960, 1961
2	Mike Slack	North Dakota State	2	1971, 1972
2	Garry Bentley	South Dakota State	2	1973, 1974
2	Ralph Serna	UC Irvine	2	1975, 1976
2	James Schankel	Cal Poly	2	1978, 1979
2	Samson Obwocha	East Texas A&M	2	1985, 1986
2	Doug Hanson	North Dakota State	2	1988, 1990
2	Charles Mulinga	Lewis	2	1994, 1995
2	Michael Aish	Western Colorado	2	1999, 2001
2	Alfred Rugema	Abilene Christian	2	2000, 2002
2	Tabor Stevens	Adams State	2	2013, 2014

== See also ==
- NCAA Men's Cross Country Championships (Division I, Division III)
- NCAA Women's Cross Country Championships (Division I, Division II, Division III)
- Pre-NCAA Cross Country Champions
- NAIA Cross Country Championships (Men, Women)
