= 2019 NCAA Division III cross country championships =

2019 cross-country running meet of the NCAA (Division III)

2019 NCAA Division III Cross Country Championships
- Edition: 47th–Men; 39th–Women
- Date: November 23, 2019
- Host city: (Kentucky) Louisville, KY
- Distances: 8 km–Men; 6 km–Women

The 2019 NCAA Division III Cross Country Championships was the 47th annual NCAA Men's Division III Cross Country Championship and the 39th annual NCAA Women's Division III Cross Country Championship to determine the team and individual national champions of NCAA Division III men's and women's collegiate cross country running in the United States. In all, four different titles were contested: men's and women's individual and team championships..

The women's race team title was won by Johns Hopkins, their 6th title (and 3rd title in the previous 4 years). The women's individual title was won by Parley Hannah of Ithaca, becoming the first Bomber to win the women's race in program history. In the men's race, the team title was won by Pomona-Pitzer, their 1st title. The men's individual title went to Patrick Watson Stevenson, becoming the first ever individual national champion for his school

== Women's title ==
- Distance: 6,000 meters

=== Women's Team Result (Top 10) ===
PL	Team	Total Time	Average Time	Score	1	2	3	4	5	6	7
1st place, gold medalist(s)	Johns Hopkins	1:50:39.8	22:08.0	125	13	16	18	27	51	80	87
2nd place, silver medalist(s)	Washington	1:50:44.7	22:09.0	138	5	14	30	42	47	105	-
3rd place, bronze medalist(s)	Williams	1:51:36.1	22:19.3	168	17	22	36	44	49	66	121
4	Chicago	1:52:13.1	22:26.7	208	12	32	35	58	71	83	102
5	Carleton	1:52:08.7	22:25.8	210	9	23	53	61	64	114	123
6	Wartburg	1:52:12.5	22:26.5	219	7	28	50	52	82	136	164
7	MIT	1:52:02.0	22:24.4	252	6	11	46	77	112	169	215
8	Tufts	1:52:40.1	22:32.1	310	4	21	43	107	135	142	187
9	Dickinson	1:53:09.3	22:37.9	332	3	38	48	78	165	174	190
10	SUNY Geneseo	1:53:24.8	22:41.0	360	2	59	89	91	119	148	192

=== Women's Individual Result (Top 10) ===
Rank	Name	Year	Team	Time
1st place, gold medalist(s)	Parley Hannah	SR	Ithaca	20:53.8
2nd place, silver medalist(s)	Genny Corcoran	SR	SUNY Geneseo	21:11.8
3rd place, bronze medalist(s)	Isabel Cardi	JR	Dickinson	21:19.9
4	Whitney Rich	JR	Whitman	21:23.6
5	Kassie Rosenbum	SO	Loras	21:25.0
6	Danielle Page	SO	Tufts	21:25.5
7	Paige Lawler	SR	Washington	21:26.1
8	Evie Bultemeyer	JR	Trine	21:27.6
9	Sophia Gorman	JR	Colby	21:29.1
10	Izzi Gengaro	SO	MIT	21:30.6

== Men's title ==
- Distance: 8,000 meters

=== Men's Team Result (Top 10) ===
PL	Team	Total Time	Average Time	Score	1	2	3	4	5	6	7
1st place, gold medalist(s)	Pomona-Pitzer	2:04:50.1	24:58.1	164	5	13	33	55	58	96	126
2nd place, silver medalist(s)	North Central	2:05:05.7	25:01.2	182	9	26	32	46	69	82	99
3rd place, bronze medalist(s)	Williams	2:05:11.5	25:02.3	183	9	16	38	45	76	150	221
4	Washington	2:05:21.3	25:04.3	193	17	31	44	49	52	60	68
5	Johns Hopkins	2:05:21.9	25:04.4	208	3	35	50	54	66	112	115
6	Claremont-Mudd-Scripps	2:05:20.1	25:04.1	222	2	34	41	72	73	87	168
7	Wisconsin-La Crosse	2:05:20.4	25:04.1	231	4	6	61	62	98	157	183
8	SUNY Geneseo	2:06:14.0	25:14.8	293	19	21	65	77	111	113	153
9	MIT	2:06:20.8	25:16.2	299	24	48	67	71	89	160	174
10	RPI	2:06:35.9	25:35.9	333	14	30	80	91	118	145	214

=== Men's Individual Result (Top 10) ===
Rank	Name	Year	Team	Time
1st place, gold medalist(s)	Patrick Watson	SR	Stevenson	24:13.9
2nd place, silver medalist(s)	Matthew Wilkinson	JR	Carleton	24:19.6
3rd place, bronze medalist(s)	Thomas D'Anieri	SR	Claremont-Mudd-Scripp	24:25.2
4	Jared Pangallozzi	JR	Johns Hopkins	24:31.7
5	Josh Schraeder	SR	Wisconsin-La Crosse	24:32.1
6	David Fassbender	JR	Wisconsin-Whitewater	24:32.7
7	Ethan Widlansky	SO	Pomona-Pitzer	24:32.7
8	Tyler Nault	SR	Wisconsin-La Crosse	24:36.9
9	Ryan Cutter	JR	Chicago	24:38.8
10	Aidan Ryan	JR	Williams	24:40.1

== See also ==
- 2019 NCAA Division I Cross Country Championships
- NCAA Women's Division III Cross Country Championship
- NCAA Men's Division III Cross Country Championship
