= 2017 NCAA Division III cross country championships =

2017 cross-country running meet of the NCAA (Division III)

2017 NCAA Division III Cross Country Championships
- Edition: 45th–Men; 37th–Women
- Date: November 18, 2017
- Host city: (Illinois) Elsah, IL
- Distances: 8 km–Men; 6 km–Women

The 2017 NCAA Division III Cross Country Championships was the 45th annual NCAA Men's Division III Cross Country Championship and the 37th annual NCAA Women's Division III Cross Country Championship to determine the team and individual national champions of NCAA Division III men's and women's collegiate cross country running in the United States. In all, four different titles were contested: men's and women's individual and team championships.

The women's race team title was won by Johns Hopkins, defending their title from the previous year and winning their 5th title in program history. The women's individual title was won by senior Khia Kurtenbach of the University of Chicago, becoming the school's second cross country individual champion in program history (and first since 1999). In the men's race, the team title was won by North Central, their 18th title (and 2nd in a row). The Cardinals 139 point margin of victory was just 5 points from tying the men's championship record for largest margin of victory. The men's individual title went to Darin Lau of Wisconsin-Eau Claire, the 1st individual men's champion in school history.

== Women's title ==
- Distance: 6,000 meters

=== Women's Team Result (Top 10) ===
PL	Team	Total Time	Average Time	Score	1	2	3	4	5	6	7
1st place, gold medalist(s)	Johns Hopkins	1:47:00	21:24	96	3	14	19	28	32	(36)	(76)
2nd place, silver medalist(s)	Wisconsin-Eau Claire	1:48:37	21:43	191	10	17	24	43	97	(170)	(174)
3rd place, bronze medalist(s)	Washington	1:48:51	21:46	202	9	16	27	71	79	(95)	(118)
4	MIT	1:49:27	21:53	210	20	35	38	47	70	(92)	-
5	Carleton	1:49:38	21:55	258	4	30	41	78	105	(181)	(208)
6	SUNY Geneseo	1:50:11	22:02	274	21	31	67	72	83	(134)	(205)
7	Tufts	1:50:08	22:01	294	7	39	50	82	116	(119)	(141)
8	Williams	1:50:21	22:04	310	15	25	60	99	111	(125)	(162)
9	Ithaca	1:50:34	22:06	350	8	23	88	93	138	(176)	(214)
10	RPI	1:51:52	22:22	397	40	63	90	91	113	(151)	(159)

=== Women's Individual Result (Top 10) ===
Rank	Name	Team	Time
1st place, gold medalist(s)	Khia Kurtenbach	University of Chicago	20:39.2
2nd place, silver medalist(s)	Bryn McKillop	Claremont-Mudd-Scripts	20:45.9
3rd place, bronze medalist(s)	Ellie Clawson	Johns Hopkins	20:47.0
4	Kaitlyn Mooney	Coast Guard	20:48.3
5	Nicky Roberts	Amherst	20:49.5
6	Meg Mathison	Carleton	21:00.3
7	Abigail Nadler	Middlebury	21:00.9
8	Cheyenne Moore	Wisconsin-Oshkosh	21:01.0
9	Emily Richards	Ohio Northern	21:02.0
10	Gabrielle Stravach	Emory	21:02.4

== Men's title ==
- Distance: 8,000 meters

=== Men's Team Result (Top 10) ===
PL	Team	Total Time	Average Time	Score	1	2	3	4	5	6	7
1st place, gold medalist(s)	North Central	2:02:47	24:33	57	2	3	7	14	31	(40)	(57)
2nd place, silver medalist(s)	Wisconsin-La Crosse	2:05:26	25:05	196	17	21	36	39	83	(106)	(216)
3rd place, bronze medalist(s)	Christopher Newport	2:05:06	25:01	221	5	11	18	71	116	(135)	(144)
4	Amherst	2:06:14	25:14	251	19	24	53	77	78	(142)	(175)
5	Washington	2:06:16	25:15	269	8	25	70	81	85	(152)	(185)
6	Pomona-Pitzer	2:06:25	25:17	282	20	22	52	64	124	(149)	(151)
7	Wisconsin-Eau Claire	2:06:55	25:11	283	1	30	75	76	101	(121)	(122)
8	Haverford	2:06:25	25:17	295	15	35	38	82	125	(186)	-
9	Loras	2:06:40	25:20	301	27	29	44	96	105	(157)	(165)
10	Carleton	2:06:49	25:21	308	12	48	69	84	95	(174)	(211)

=== Men's Individual Result (Top 10) ===
Rank	Name	Team	Time
1st place, gold medalist(s)	Darin Lau	Wisconsin-Eau Claire	24:03.59
2nd place, silver medalist(s)	Jared Borowsky	North Central	24:12.44
3rd place, bronze medalist(s)	Dhruvil Patel	North Central	24:14.15
4	Grant O'Connor	RPI	24:19.35
5	Grayson Reid	Christopher Newport	24:20.60
6	Isaac Garcia-Cassani	SUNY Geneseo	24:32.24
7	Brad Hodkinson	Pacific Lutheran	24:32.25
8	Al Baldonado	North Central	24:34.92
9	David O'Gara	Washington	24:36.50
10	Ian McVey	Ohio Northern	24:37.00

== See also ==
- NCAA Women's Division III Cross Country Championship
- NCAA Men's Division III Cross Country Championship
