= Mark Conover =

American long distance runner and coach (1960–2022)

Mark Robert Conover (May 28, 1960 – April 6, 2022) was an American long distance runner and coach. He was born in Contra Costa County, California. He is most famous for his unexpected strategic victory at the 1988 United States Olympic Trials marathon, qualifying him for the 1988 Summer Olympics in Seoul, South Korea, where he was a member of the U.S. Team. The winning time of 2:12:26 at the Olympic trials was his personal best.

Conover showed his potential running for Miramonte High School in Orinda, California, finishing fifth at the CIF California State Meet in the 2 mile behind Jeff Nelson just a year before Nelson would set the record in the event which would hold for almost 30 years.

He then went on to Humboldt State University, where he became the 1981 NCAA Division II Cross Country Champion. In 1993, he was inducted into the Humboldt State Hall of Fame.

1984 was his first Olympic Trials, finishing ninth in a qualifying heat of the 10,000 metres. At the Seoul Games, an injury kept him from finishing in his Olympics debut. Four years later, Conover returned to the marathon to finish 10th at the 1992 trials.

His time as a professional runner was cut short in 1993 by a two-year battle with Hodgkin’s disease, although he returned to running in years to follow. Professional internships that developed into planning jobs in San Luis Obispo County had him training in the area. He began as an assistant coach at Cal Poly, San Luis Obispo. In 2009 he was named director of track & field and cross country for the university.

Conover then led his teams to Big West Conference women's cross country titles in 2012 and 2013, a women's track & field crown in the spring of 2021, and men's cross country titles in 2009, 2011, 2012, 2013, 2016, 2017, 2018, and 2019.

Conover died on April 6, 2022, after battling cancer. He was 61. In February 2023, Cal Poly announced it had renamed its annual Cal Poly Invitational meet held in late March to the Mark Conover Classic in his memory.
