= 2018 NCAA Division III cross country championships =

2018 cross-country running meet of the NCAA (Division III)

2018 NCAA Division III Cross Country Championships
- Edition: 46th–Men; 38th–Women
- Date: November 17, 2018
- Host city: (Wisconsin) Winneconne, WI
- Distances: 8 km–Men; 6 km–Women

The 2018 NCAA Division III Cross Country Championships was the 46th annual NCAA Men's Division III Cross Country Championship and the 38th annual NCAA Women's Division III Cross Country Championship to determine the team and individual national champions of NCAA Division III men's and women's collegiate cross country running in the United States. In all, four different titles were contested: men's and women's individual and team championships.

The women's race team title was won by Washington University, their 2nd title. Washington narrowly edged out defending champion Johns Hopkins by a single point, making it the narrowest margin of victory since 1987. The women's individual title was won by junior Paige Lawler of Washington University, becoming the first cross country individual champion in program history. In the men's race, the team title was won by North Central, their 19th title (and 3rd in a row). The Cardinals 43 point victory was the 3rd lowest winning score in the history of the men's race (and the lowest score since 2006). The men's individual title went to Dhruvil Patel of North Central, the 8th Cardinal to win the individual men's title in program history, and the first since 2000.

== Women's title ==
- Distance: 6,000 meters

=== Women's Team Result (Top 10) ===
PL	Team	Total Time	Average Time	Score	1	2	3	4	5	6	7
1st place, gold medalist(s)	Washington	1:47:52	21:34	98	1	6	10	23	58	79	102
2nd place, silver medalist(s)	Johns Hopkins	1:48:33	21:42	99	5	16	18	27	33	37	71
3rd place, bronze medalist(s)	MIT	1:51:11	22:14	247	14	41	54	65	73	93	157
4	Wisconsin-Eau Claire	1:51:35	22:19	265	22	43	52	53	95	123	139
5	SUNY Geneseo	1:51:22	22:16	277	17	19	31	103	107	115	136
6	Brandeis	1:51:09	22:13	277	4	48	51	60	114	160	202
7	Williams	1:51:54	22:22	283	36	44	46	76	81	172	184
8	Middlebury	1:51:47	22:21	301	21	28	67	77	108	130	203
9	Wisconsin-La Crosse	1:51:35	22:19	313	9	15	74	88	127	134	168
10	Carleton	1:52:18	22:27	326	34	45	50	78	119	163	164

=== Women's Individual Result (Top 10) ===
Rank	Name	Team	Time
1st place, gold medalist(s)	Paige Lawler	Washington	20:55.0
2nd place, silver medalist(s)	Claire Lamb	Otterbein	20:58.7
3rd place, bronze medalist(s)	Annie Rodenfels	Centre	20:58.9
4	Kaitlyn Mooney	Coast Guard	21:04.2
5	Emily Bryson	Brandeis	21:08.3
6	Caelyn Reilly	Johns Hopkins	21:11.3
7	Aly Wayne	Washington	21:12.6
8	Natalie Cooper	TCNJ	21:14.3
9	Emily Forner	Allegheny	21:16.7
10	Cassie Vince	Albion	21:21.2

== Men's title ==
- Distance: 8,000 meters

=== Men's Team Result (Top 10) ===
PL	Team	Total Time	Average Time	Score	1	2	3	4	5	6	7
1st place, gold medalist(s)	North Central	2:03:15	24:39	43	1	2	7	9	24	50	63
2nd place, silver medalist(s)	Washington	2:04:33	24:54	110	6	8	23	32	41	56	153
3rd place, bronze medalist(s)	Wisconsin-La Crosse	2:04:45	24:57	127	4	11	22	31	59	83	166
4	Haverford	2:05:55	25:11	213	12	14	21	61	105	183	208
5	Wartburg	2:06:16	25:15	227	19	29	40	54	85	87	122
6	Amherst	2:06:37	25:19	253	18	37	51	53	94	170	205
7	Pomona-Pitzer	2:06:56	25:23	298	3	42	70	84	99	114	142
8	Williams	2:06:52	25:22	300	5	30	75	92	98	124	133
9	Johns Hopkins	2:07:18	25:27	308	10	65	72	80	81	132	146
10	SUNY Geneseo	2:07:29	25:29	329	17	46	73	86	107	110	216

=== Men's Individual Result (Top 10) ===
Rank	Name	Team	Time
1st place, gold medalist(s)	Dhruvil Patel	North Central	24:24.5
2nd place, silver medalist(s)	Al Baldonado	North Central	24:29.7
3rd place, bronze medalist(s)	Andy Reischling	Pomona-Pitzer	24:32.9
4	Josh Schraeder	Wisconsin-La Crosse	24:34.2
5	Ian McVey	Ohio Northern	24:37.1
6	Ryan Cox	Williams	24:37.2
7	Brad Hodkinson	Washington	24:39.1
8	Chris Buechner	North Central	24:41.2
9	Zach Lee	Wisconsin-Platteville	24:42.4
10	Nick Matteucci	Washington	24:43.9

== See also ==
- NCAA Women's Division III Cross Country Championship
- NCAA Men's Division III Cross Country Championship
