= 1958 NCAA College Division cross country championships =

1958 cross-country running meet of the NCAA (College Division)

1958 NCAA College Division Cross Country Championships
- Organisers: NCAA
- Edition: 1st
- Date: November 15, 1958
- Host city: (Illinois) Wheaton, Illinois; Wheaton College
- Venue: Chicago Country Club
- Distances: 4 miles (6.4 km)
- Participation: 20–teams 114–individuals athletes

The 1958 NCAA College Division Cross Country Championships were contested at the first annual NCAA-sanctioned cross country meet to determine the team and individual national champions of men's collegiate cross country running among small colleges in the United States.

This was the first NCAA championship held exclusively for College Division (future Divisions II and III) teams; all university teams remained part of the NCAA University Division Cross Country Championship (later re-designated as Division I).

Held on November 15, 1958, the meet was hosted by Wheaton College at the Chicago Country Club in Wheaton, Illinois. The distance for the race was 4 miles (6.4 kilometers).

The team national championship was won by Northern Illinois, the Huskies' first. The individual championship was won by Paul Whiteley, from Kansas State Teachers, with a time of 20:45.

== Qualification ==
Following the creation of the NCAA"s multi-division structure this year, only NCAA College Division teams, and their respective runners, were eligible. In total, 20 teams and 114 individual runners contested this championship.

== Results ==
- Distance: 4 miles (6.4 kilometers)

=== Team result ===
Rank	Team	Points
1st place, gold medalist(s)	Northern Illinois	90
2nd place, silver medalist(s)	South Dakota State	93
3rd place, bronze medalist(s)	Central Michigan	107
4	Wheaton (IL) (H)	131
5	Southern Illinois	134
6	Wabash	140
7	Kansas State Teachers	148
8	Slippery Rock State	202
9	Ohio Wesleyan	205
10	Mankato State	217
11	Roanoke	231
12	DePauw	258
13	Albion	319

== See also ==
- NCAA University Division Cross Country Championship
