= Air Force Falcons women's cross country =

- University: United States Air Force Academy
- Head coach: Laura Bowerman (3rd season)
- Conference: MW
- Location: Air Force Academy, CO
- Nickname: Falcons
- Colors: Blue and silver

National championships
- AIWA Division II: 1979

NCAA Championship appearances
- AIWA Division II: 1979, 1980, 1981; NCAA Division II: 1982, 1983, 1986, 1987, 1988, 1989, 1990, 1992, 1993, 1994, 1995; NCAA Division I: 2016, 2019

Air Force Falcons women's cross country is one of the cross country teams of the United States Air Force Academy in Air Force Academy, Colorado.The Falcons compete in the Mountain West Conference at the Division I level in the NCAA and are coached by Laura Bowerman.

== National Championships ==
=== Team National Championship ===
Year	Runner-up	Score
1979		

=== Individual National Champion ===
Year	Athlete	Time
1990	Callie Calhoun	16:57

== Championship Results ==
Year	Coach	Place	Points
2019	Ryan Cole	8th	259
2016	Ryan Cole	25th	527
1995	Mark Stanforth	6th	184
1994	Mark Stanforth	14th	275
1993	Mark Stanforth	11th	265
1992	Mark Stanforth	6th	149
1990	Capt. Gail Conway	2nd	78
1989	Capt. Gail Conway	2nd	67
1988	Capt. Mark Sperre	2nd	51
1987	Capt. Mark Sperre	9th	198
1986	Capt. Gus Schalkham	9th	198
1983	Ernie Cuncliffe	8th	176
1982	Ernie Cuncliffe	6th	173
1981	Ernie Cuncliffe	2nd	85
1980	Ernie Cuncliffe	3rd	122
1979	Ernie Cuncliffe	1st	79

== Coaches ==
Coach	Tenure
Laura Bowerman	2022-Present
Ryan Cole	2014-2022
Juli Benson	2009-2014
Ralph Linderman	2008-2009
John Hayes	2007-2008
Mark Stanforth	1992-2007
Capt. Gail Conway	1989-1992
Capt. Mark Sperre	1987-1989
Capt. Gus Schalkham	1985-1987
Ernie Cuncliffe	1979-1985
Capt. Jim Scott	1977-1979
Maj. Lloyd "Vic" Hackley	1976-1977
