= Ron Stonitsch =

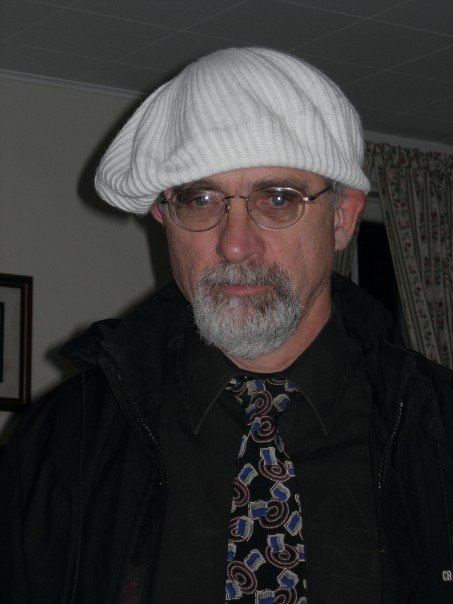
Stonitsch in 2006

Ron Stonitsch was the 1969 NCAA Division II Cross-Country National Champion, a multiple All-American in Cross-Country and Track, a 4:01 miler and the C. W. Post College record holder in the one, two, and three-mile events. He also holds the Penn Relays 2 mile record (8:38). Since 1982, Stonitsch has coached cross-country at Vassar College. There he coached three runners to All-American status: Tracy Nichols (1990), James McCowan (1997), and Colin Sanders (2006).
