= NCAA Division III women's cross country championships =

American collegiate cross country tournament

- Association: NCAA
- Sport: Cross country
- Founded: 1981; 45 years ago
- Division: Division III
- Country: United States
- Most recent champion: NYU (1st)
- Most titles: Johns Hopkins (8)
- Broadcaster: FloTrack Media
- Website: https://www.ncaa.com/sports/cross-country-women/d3

The NCAA Division III women's cross country championships are contested at an annual cross country meet hosted by the NCAA to determine the individual and team national champions of women's intercollegiate cross country running among its Division III programs in the United States. It is held every fall, usually on the Saturday before Thanksgiving in November.

The most successful program is Johns Hopkins, with eight national titles.

The current champions are NYU, who won their first title in 2025.

== Format ==
The race included 9 teams in 1981, 12 teams from 1982 to 1986, 14 teams from 1987 to 1992, 21 teams from 1993 to 1998 and 24 teams from 1999 to 2005. Beginning in 2006, the national championship race has included 32 teams. Teams compete in one of eight regional championships to qualify. In addition to the 32 teams, 56 individual runners qualify for the national championship.

== Results ==
- The race distance was 5,000 meters (5 kilometers) from 1981 to 2001 and 6,000 meters (6 kilometers) from 2002 to the present.

NCAA Division III Women's Cross Country Championship
Year	Finals Site (Host Team)	Team Championship				Individual Championship		Records	Refs
Year	Finals Site (Host Team)	Winner	Points	Runner-up	Points	Winner (Team)	Time	Records	Refs
1981	Kenosha, WI (Carthage)	Central (IA)	26	Glassboro State	70	Cynthia Sturm (Westfield State)	18:43.30†	Pomona-Pitzer Athletics	
1982	Fredonia, NY (Fredonia)	St. Thomas (MN)	44	UW–La Crosse	83	Tori Neubauer (UW–La Crosse)	18:45.00	Pomona-Pitzer Athletics	
1983	Newport News, VA (Christopher Newport)	UW–La Crosse	45	St. Thomas (MN)	70	Tori Neubauer (UW–La Crosse)	16:29.00	Pomona-Pitzer Athletics	
1984	Delaware, OH (Ohio Wesleyan)	St. Thomas (MN) (2)	50	UW–La Crosse	64	Julia Kirtland (Macalester)	17:23.55	Pomona-Pitzer Athletics	
1985	Atlanta, GA (Emory)	Franklin & Marshall	73	St. Thomas (MN)	81	Dorcas Denhartog (Middlebury)	18:05.00	Pomona-Pitzer Athletics	
1986	Fredonia, NY (Fredonia)	St. Thomas (MN) (3)	45	Ithaca	73	Lisa Koelfgen (St. Thomas–MN)	19:14.00	Pomona-Pitzer Athletics	
1987	Holland, MI (Hope)	St. Thomas (MN) (4); UW–Oshkosh	81	Ithaca	85	Shelley Scherer (Carleton)	17:36.00	Pomona-Pitzer Athletics	
1988	St. Louis, MO (WashU)	UW–Oshkosh (2)	69	St. Thomas (MN)	73	Anna Prineas (Carleton)	17:38.60	Pomona-Pitzer Athletics	
1989	Rock Island, IL (Augustana–IL)	Cortland State	29	UW–Oshkosh	62	Marybeth Crawley (Cortland State)	17:19.00	Pomona-Pitzer Athletics	
1990	Grinnell, IA (Grinnell)	Cortland State (2)	43	UW–Oshkosh	48	Vicki Mitchell (Cortland State)	17:24.71	Pomona-Pitzer Athletics	
1991	Newport News, VA (Christopher Newport)	UW–Oshkosh (2)	98	Cortland State	103	Laura Horejs (UW–Oshkosh)	17:21.00	Pomona-Pitzer Athletics	
1992	Schenectady, NY (Union)	Cortland State (3)	18	Calvin	108	Sarah Edmonds (Gustavus Adolphus)	18:09.80	Pomona-Pitzer Athletics	
1993	Grinnell, IA (Grinnell)	Cortland State (4)	61	Calvin	93	Renea Bluekamp (Calvin)	17:46.70	Pomona-Pitzer Athletics	
1994	Bethlehem, PA (Moravian)	Cortland State (5)	54	Calvin	115	Michelle LaFleur (Cortland State)	17:47.20	Pomona-Pitzer Athletics	
1995	La Crosse, WI (UW–La Crosse)	Cortland State (6)	46	UW–Oshkosh	83	Jessica Caley (Williams)	17:24.50	Pomona-Pitzer Athletics	
1996	Rock Island, IL (Augustana–IL)	UW–Oshkosh (3)	62	St. Thomas (MN)	113	Turena Johnson (Luther)	17:40.00	Pomona-Pitzer Athletics	
1997	Cambridge, MA (MIT)	Cortland State (7)	148	UW–Eau Claire	167	Tiffany Speckman (UW–Oshkosh)	18:29.00	Pomona-Pitzer Athletics	
1998	Carlisle, PA (Dickinson)	Calvin	124	TCNJ	170	Cheryl Smith (Cortland State)	17:48.39	Pomona-Pitzer Athletics	
1999	Oshkosh, WI (UW–Oshkosh)	Calvin (2)	85	Middlebury	119	Rhaina Echols (Chicago)	16:46.20	Pomona-Pitzer Athletics	
2000	Spokane, WA (Whitworth)	Middlebury	103	Williams	123	Johanna Olson (Luther)	17:54.40	Pomona-Pitzer Athletics	
2001	Rock Island, IL (Augustana–IL)	Middlebury (2)	98	Williams	166	Dana Boyle (Puget Sound)	16:46.00		
The race distance changes from 5 kilometers to 6 kilometers									
2002	Northfield, MN (St. Olaf)	Williams	42	Middlebury	145	Missy Buttry (Wartburg)	20:17.30†		
2003	Hanover, IN (Hanover)	Middlebury (3)	135	Trinity (CT)	174	Missy Buttry (Wartburg)	20:00.20		
2004	Eau Claire, WI (UW–Eau Claire)	Williams (2)	110	Middlebury	129	Missy Buttry (Wartburg)	20:22.00		
2005	Delaware, OH (Ohio Wesleyan)	SUNY Geneseo	88	Williams	107	Hailey Harren (Gustavus Adolphus)	21:51.90		
2006	Wilmington, OH (Wilmington)	Middlebury (4)	144	Amherst	145	Sarah Zerzan (Willamette)	22:31.00		
2007	Northfield, MN (St. Olaf)	Amherst	120	Plattsburgh State	159	Sarah Zerzan (Willamette)	20:54.00	Results	
2008	Hanover, IN (Hanover)	Middlebury (5)	179	Calvin	237	Marie Borner (Bethel)	20:43.91	Results FinishTiming.com	
2009	Berea, OH (Baldwin Wallace)	UW–Eau Claire	171	St. Lawrence	180	Wendy Pavlus (St. Lawrence)	21:28.00	Results	
2010	Waverly, IA (Wartburg)	Middlebury (6)	185	Washington University in St. Louis	193	Wendy Pavlus (St. Lawrence)	20:49.30	Results	
2011	Oshkosh, WI (UW–Oshkosh)	Washington University in St. Louis	70	Middlebury	111	Chiara Del Piccolo (Williams)	20:52.08	Results	
2012	Terre Haute, IN (Rose-Hulman)	Johns Hopkins	158	Wartburg	221	Christy Cazzola (UW–Oshkosh)	20:53.30	Delta Timing Results	
2013	Hanover, IN (Hanover)	Johns Hopkins (2)	85	Williams	137	Chelsea Johnson (St. Scholastica)	21:11.70	TFRRS Delta Timing	
2014	Wilmington, OH (Wilmington)	Johns Hopkins (3)	87	MIT	112	Amy Regan (Stevens)	20:51.90	TFRRS FinishTimingResults.com	
2015	Winneconne, WI (UW–Oshkosh)	Williams	81	Geneseo State	179	Abrah Masterson (Cornell College)	21:23.10	TFRRS Boxscore	
2016	Louisville, KY (Louisville)	Johns Hopkins (4)	128	Washington University in St. Louis	202	Amy Regan (Stevens Tech)	20:16.40	TFRRS Delta Timing	
2017; Details	Elsah, IL (Principia)	Johns Hopkins (5)	96	UW–Eau Claire	191	Khia Kurtenbach (Chicago)	20:39.20	TFRRS TRXC Timing	
2018; Details	Winneconne, WI (UW–Oshkosh)	Washington University in St. Louis (2)	98	Johns Hopkins	99	Paige Lawler (Washington University in St. Louis)	20:55.00	TFRRS Delta Timing Official Meet Report	
2019; Details	Louisville, KY (Spalding)	Johns Hopkins (6)	125	Washington University in St. Louis	138	Parley Hannan; Ithaca College	20:53.8	TFRRS Leone Timing	
2020	Not held because of the COVID-19 pandemic								
2021	Louisville, KY (Spalding)	Johns Hopkins (7)	130	Claremont-Mudd-Scripps	132	Kassie Rosenblum (Loras)	20:11.1	TFRRS Leone Timing	
2022	Lansing, MI (Olivet)	Johns Hopkins (8)	144	Chicago	147	Kassie Rosenblum Parker (Loras)	21:06.5	TFRRS	
2023	Carlisle, PA (Dickinson)	Carleton	151	NYU	154	Fiona Smith (Saint Benedict)	19:54.1		
2024	Terre Haute, IN (Rose–Hulman)	MIT	128	Chicago	138	Faith Duncan (Wilmington (OH))	20:16.5		
2025	Spartanburg, SC (Converse)	NYU	79	Williams	106	Audrey Maclean (Middlebury)	20:16.8		

- A † indicates a then-NCAA record-setting time for that particular distance.
- A time highlighted in ██ indicates the all-time NCAA championship record for that distance.

== Champions ==
=== Team titles ===
Team	Titles	Years
Johns Hopkins	8	2012, 2013, 2014, 2016, 2017, 2019, 2021, 2022
Cortland	7	1989, 1990, 1992, 1993, 1994, 1995, 1997
Middlebury	6	2000, 2001, 2003, 2006, 2008, 2010
Wisconsin–Oshkosh	4	1987, 1988, 1991, 1996
Williams	3	2002, 2004, 2015
Washington University	2	2011, 2018
Calvin	2	1998, 1999
NYU	1	2025
MIT	1	2024
Carleton	1	2023
Wisconsin–Eau Claire	1	2009
Amherst	1	2007
Geneseo	1	2005
Franklin & Marshall	1	1985
Wisconsin–La Crosse	1	1983
Central (IA)	1	1981

==== Former programs ====
Team	Titles	Years
St. Thomas (MN)	4	1982, 1984, 1986, 1987

== See also ==
- NCAA Women's Cross Country Championships (Division I, Division II)
- NCAA Men's Cross Country Championships (Division I, Division II, Division III)
- Pre-NCAA Cross Country Champions
- NAIA Cross Country Championships (Men, Women)
