= Adams State Grizzlies =

Athletic teams of Adams State University

- University: Adams State University
- Conference: RMAC
- NCAA: Division II
- Athletic director: Katelyn Smith
- Location: Alamosa, Colorado
- Varsity teams: 18 (9 men's, 9 women's)
- Football stadium: Rex Stadium
- Basketball arena: Plachy Hall
- Baseball stadium: ASU Baseball Field
- Soccer stadium: ASU Soccer Field
- Nickname: Grizzlies
- Colors: Green and white
- Website: asugrizzlies.com
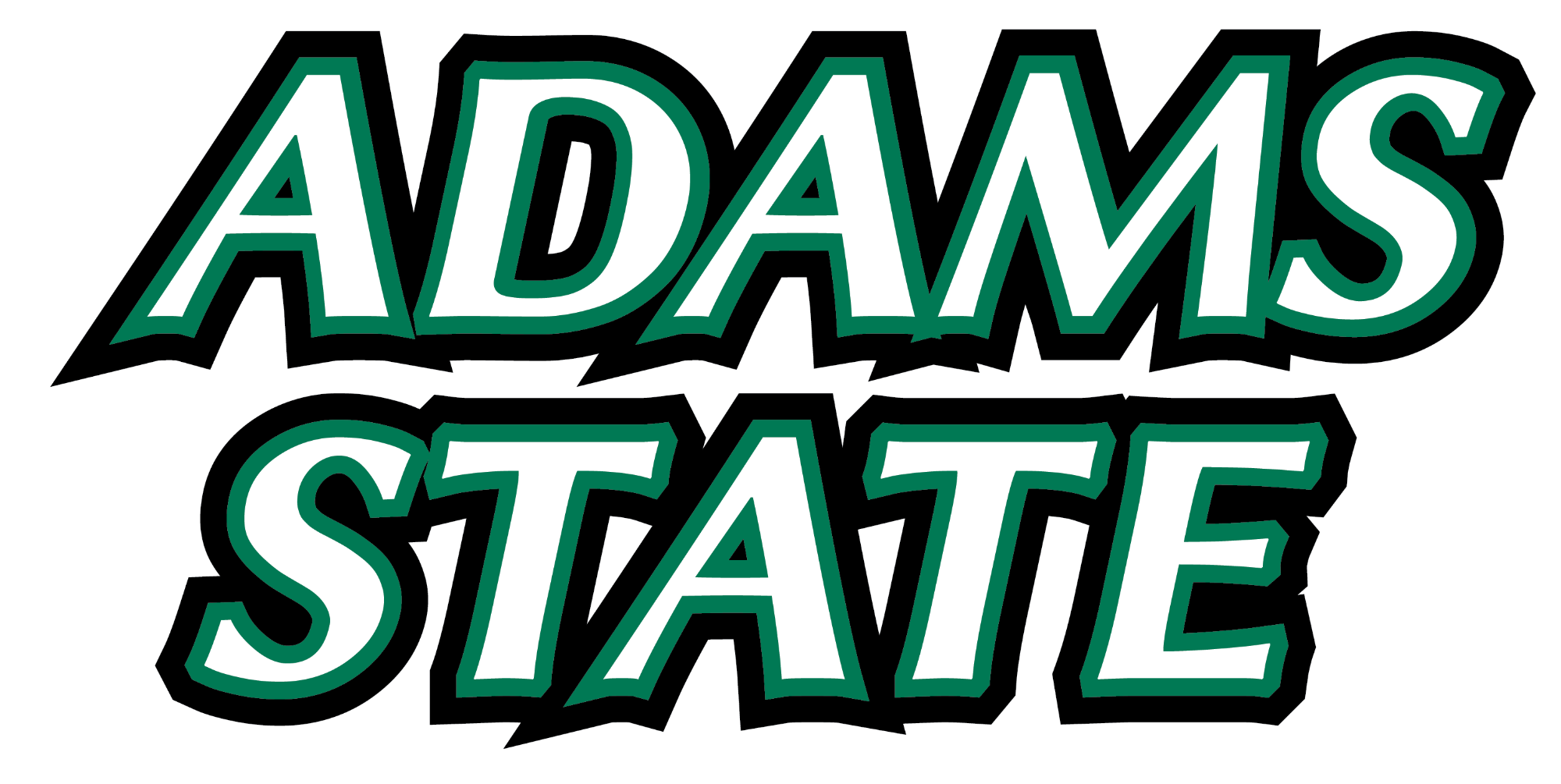

Team NCAA championships
- 40

The Adams State Grizzlies are the athletic teams that represent Adams State University, located in Alamosa, Colorado, in NCAA Division II intercollegiate sports. The Grizzlies compete as members of the Rocky Mountain Athletic Conference for all 18 varsity sports.

Adams State adopted the Grizzlies nickname in the spring of 1996. The school's athletic teams were known as the Indians from the mid-1920s until November 1995.

== Varsity sports ==
=== Teams ===
Men's sports

- Baseball
- Basketball
- Cross Country
- Football
- Lacrosse
- Soccer
- Swimming
- Track & Field
- Wrestling

Women's sports

- Basketball
- Cross Country
- Golf
- Soccer
- Softball
- Swimming
- Track & Field
- Volleyball
- Wrestling

== National championships ==
=== Team ===
The Grizzlies have won sixty-one team national championships.

| Sport | Association | Division | Year | Opponent/Runner-up | Score |
|---|---|---|---|---|---|
| Men's Cross Country (25) | NAIA (12) | — | 1971 | Eastern New Mexico | 196–210 |
| Men's Cross Country (25) | NAIA (12) | — | 1977 | Saginaw Valley State | 102–133 |
| Men's Cross Country (25) | NAIA (12) | — | 1979 | Wisconsin–La Crosse | 63–123 |
| Men's Cross Country (25) | NAIA (12) | — | 1980 | Malone | 48–78 |
| Men's Cross Country (25) | NAIA (12) | — | 1981 | Wisconsin–La Crosse | 76–109 |
| Men's Cross Country (25) | NAIA (12) | — | 1983 | Wisconsin–La Crosse | 47–95 |
| Men's Cross Country (25) | NAIA (12) | — | 1984 | Wisconsin–La Crosse | 31–97 |
| Men's Cross Country (25) | NAIA (12) | — | 1985 | Wisconsin–La Crosse | 26–105 |
| Men's Cross Country (25) | NAIA (12) | — | 1986 | Western State | 78–78 |
| Men's Cross Country (25) | NAIA (12) | — | 1987 | New Mexico Highlands | 21–171 |
| Men's Cross Country (25) | NAIA (12) | — | 1988 | Western State | 51–88 |
| Men's Cross Country (25) | NAIA (12) | — | 1989 | Malone | 39–53 |
| Men's Cross Country (25) | NCAA (13) | Division II | 1992 | Western State | 15–56 |
| Men's Cross Country (25) | NCAA (13) | Division II | 1993 | Edinboro | 25–103 |
| Men's Cross Country (25) | NCAA (13) | Division II | 1994 | Western State | 55–73 |
| Men's Cross Country (25) | NCAA (13) | Division II | 1998 | Western State | 68–74 |
| Men's Cross Country (25) | NCAA (13) | Division II | 2003 | Abilene Christian | 40–68 |
| Men's Cross Country (25) | NCAA (13) | Division II | 2008 | Western State | 67–88 |
| Men's Cross Country (25) | NCAA (13) | Division II | 2009 | Western State | 23–85 |
| Men's Cross Country (25) | NCAA (13) | Division II | 2010 | Western State | 57–102 |
| Men's Cross Country (25) | NCAA (13) | Division II | 2012 | Colorado Mines | 34–102 |
| Men's Cross Country (25) | NCAA (13) | Division II | 2013 | Grand Valley State | 54–104 |
| Men's Cross Country (25) | NCAA (13) | Division II | 2014 | Grand Valley State | 69–127 |
| Men's Cross Country (25) | NCAA (13) | Division II | 2016 | Grand Valley State | 54–79 |
| Men's Cross Country (25) | NCAA (13) | Division II | 2017 | Grand Valley State | 44–64 |
| Women's Cross Country (24) | NAIA (3) | — | 1981 | Barry | 25–71 |
| Women's Cross Country (24) | NAIA (3) | — | 1989 | Western State | 79–132 |
| Women's Cross Country (24) | NAIA (3) | — | 1991 | Simon Fraser | 66–87 |
| Women's Cross Country (24) | NCAA (21) | Division II | 1992 | Western State | 64–99 |
| Women's Cross Country (24) | NCAA (21) | Division II | 1993 | Cal Poly–San Luis Obispo | 75–106 |
| Women's Cross Country (24) | NCAA (21) | Division II | 1994 | Western State | 47–55 |
| Women's Cross Country (24) | NCAA (21) | Division II | 1995 | Abilene Christian | 62–143 |
| Women's Cross Country (24) | NCAA (21) | Division II | 1996 | Western State | 35–94 |
| Women's Cross Country (24) | NCAA (21) | Division II | 1997 | Western State; Lewis | 37–106 |
| Women's Cross Country (24) | NCAA (21) | Division II | 1998 | Western State | 56–79 |
| Women's Cross Country (24) | NCAA (21) | Division II | 1999 | Western State | 23–47 |
| Women's Cross Country (24) | NCAA (21) | Division II | 2003 | Western State | 38–101 |
| Women's Cross Country (24) | NCAA (21) | Division II | 2004 | Edinboro | 31–101 |
| Women's Cross Country (24) | NCAA (21) | Division II | 2005 | Grand Valley State | 54–69 |
| Women's Cross Country (24) | NCAA (21) | Division II | 2006 | Western State | 94–101 |
| Women's Cross Country (24) | NCAA (21) | Division II | 2007 | Seattle Pacific | 63–178 |
| Women's Cross Country (24) | NCAA (21) | Division II | 2008 | Grand Valley State | 79–102 |
| Women's Cross Country (24) | NCAA (21) | Division II | 2009 | Grand Valley State | 73–81 |
| Women's Cross Country (24) | NCAA (21) | Division II | 2015 | Grand Valley State | 83–97 |
| Women's Cross Country (24) | NCAA (21) | Division II | 2017 | Mary (ND) | 126–137 |
| Women's Cross Country (24) | NCAA (21) | Division II | 2019 | Grand Valley State | 23–87 |
| Women's Cross Country (24) | NCAA (21) | Division II | 2021 | Grand Valley State | 59-79 |
| Women's Cross Country (24) | NCAA (21) | Division II | 2022 | Grand Valley State | 75–126 |
| Women's Cross Country (24) | NCAA (21) | Division II | 2024 | Grand Valley State | 61–127 |
| Men's indoor track and field (4) | NAIA (2) | Single | 1990 | Azusa Pacific | 58–44 |
| Men's indoor track and field (4) | NAIA (2) | Single | 1992 | Azusa Pacific | 82–72 |
| Men's indoor track and field (4) | NCAA (2) | Division II | 2010 | St. Augustine's | 89–72 (+17) |
| Men's indoor track and field (4) | NCAA (2) | Division II | 2015 | Findlay | 45–40 (+5) |
| Women's indoor track and field (7) | NAIA (1) | Single | 1985 | Prairie View A&M | 67–64 |
| Women's indoor track and field (7) | NCAA (6) | Division II | 2008 | St. Augustine's | 55–48 (+7) |
| Women's indoor track and field (7) | NCAA (6) | Division II | 2014 | Johnson C. Smith | 67–59 (+8) |
| Women's indoor track and field (7) | NCAA (6) | Division II | 2017 | Grand Valley State | 47–39 (+8) |
| Women's indoor track and field (7) | NCAA (6) | Division II | 2019 | Grand Valley State | 87–64 (+23) |
| Women's indoor track and field (7) | NCAA (6) | Division II | 2023 | Minnesota State | 52-51 (+1) |
| Women's indoor track and field (7) | NCAA (6) | Division II | 2024 | Pittsburgh State | 67–64.5 (+2.5) |
| Men's Outdoor Track and Field (1) | NCAA | Division II | 2012 | Lincoln (MO) | 77–73 (+4) |

== Individual sports ==
=== Cross-country and track ===
The Grizzly track and cross-country teams are coached by Damon Martin, winner of 20 National Coach of the Year awards. Martin was inducted into Adams State's Hall of Fame in 2007, and the Colorado Running Hall of Fame in 2015. In 2018, he was inducted into the USTFCCCA Hall of Fame. ASU's Men's cross-country team was the first team in history to record a perfect score at the National Championships in 1992. This was the first year Adams competed in NCAA Division II, after previously competing in the NAIA. The women's cross-country team won 15 National Championships between 1992 and 2009. 2016 World Indoor Champion Boris Berian ran for Adams during the 2012 track seasons, winning national championships for the 800m both indoors and outdoors.

=== Football ===
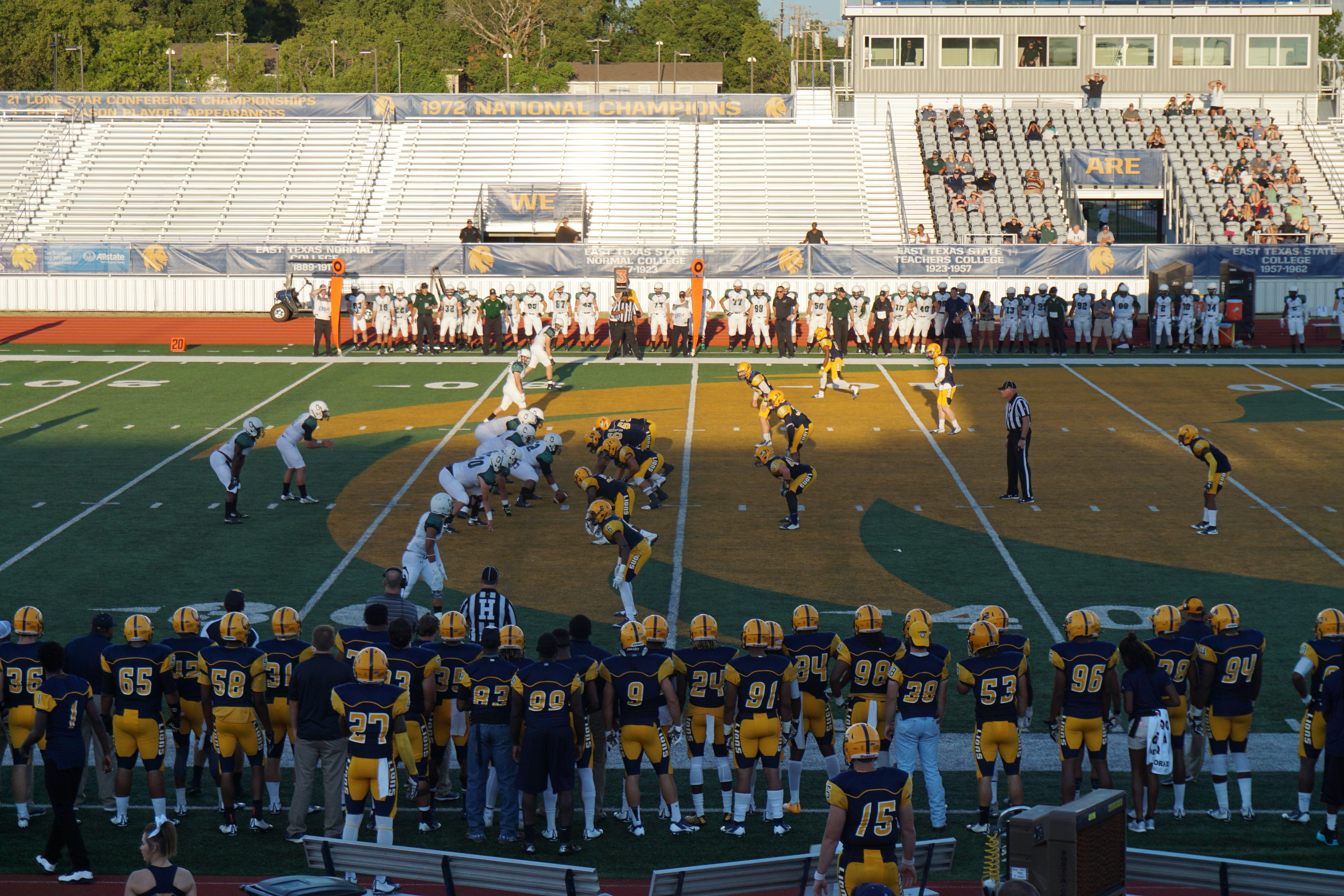
The Adams State football team in action against the Texas A&M–Commerce Lions in 2015

Levi Gallas is the head coach of the Adams State Grizzlies football team.

==== Conferences ====
- 1930–1945: Independent
- 1946–1955: New Mexico Intercollegiate Conference
- 1956: Independent
- 1957–present: Rocky Mountain Athletic Conference

== Non-NCAA sports ==
=== Teams ===
Men's sports

- Rugby
- Rodeo

Women's sports

- Rodeo

Co-ed sports

- Cycling
- Climbing
