= NCAA Division III men's cross country championships =

American collegiate cross country tournament

- Association: NCAA
- Sport: Cross country
- Founded: 1973; 53 years ago
- Division: Division III
- Country: United States
- Most recent champion: Wisconsin-La Crosse (5th)
- Most titles: North Central (IL) (19)
- Website: NCAA.com

The NCAA Division III men's cross country championships are contested at an annual meet hosted by the NCAA to determine the individual and team national champions of men's collegiate cross country running among its Division III members in the United States. It has been held every fall, usually in November, since the NCAA split into its current three-division format in 1973.

North Central (IL) have been the most successful program, with 19 national titles.

The current champions are Wisconsin-La Crosse, who won their fifth national title in 2025.

== Format ==
The field for the national championship race varied in the early years, reaching a high of 52 teams in 1977. From 1982 to 1998 the field was fixed at 21 teams. From 1999 to 2005 the field included 24 teams. Beginning in 2006, the national championship race has included 32 teams. Teams compete in one of ten regional championships to qualify. In addition to the 32 teams, 70 individual runners qualify for the national championship.

The race distance from 1973 to 1975 was 5 miles (8,046 meters). Since 1976 the race distance has been 8,000 meters (4.97 miles).

== Results ==
NCAA Division III Men's Cross Country Championship
Year	Site (Host Team)	Championship Results				Individual Championship	
Year	Site (Host Team)	Champion	Points	Runner-up	Points	Winner (Team)	Time
1973	Wheaton, IL (Wheaton)	Ashland	66	Albany (NY)	172	Steve Foster (Ashland)	24:27
1974	Wheaton, IL (Wheaton)	Mount Union	105	Occidental	148	David Moller (Rochester–NY)	24:39.
1975	Waltham, MA (Brandeis)	North Central (IL)	91	Occidental	111	Vin Fleming (Lowell)	24:27
The race distance changes from 5 miles to 8,000 meters
1976	Cleveland, OH (Case)	North Central (IL) (2)	109	Humboldt State	132	Dale Kramer (Carleton)	24:56†
1977	Cleveland, OH (Case)	Occidental	149	Humboldt State	152	Dale Kramer (Carleton)	25:44
1978	Rock Island, IL (Augustana–IL)	North Central (IL) (3)	60	Luther	151	Dan Henderson (Wheaton–IL)	23:54†
1979	Rock Island, IL (Augustana–IL)	North Central (IL) (4)	85	Humboldt State	93	Steve Hunt (UMass Boston)	24:12.1
1980	Rochester, NY (Rochester)	Carleton	121	Augustana (IL)	125	Jeff Milliman (North Central–IL)	25:20.2
1981	Kenosha, WI (Carthage)	North Central (IL) (5)	89	Brandeis	107	Mark Whalley (Principia)	25:25
1982	Fredonia, NY (Fredonia)	North Central (IL) (6)	51	Brandeis	89	Nicholas Manciu (St. Thomas–MN)	26:06
1983	Newport News, VA (Christopher Newport)	Brandeis	52	North Central (IL)	89	Tony Bluell (North Central–IL)	23:46†
1984	Delaware, OH (Ohio Wesleyan)	St. Thomas (MN)	52	North Central (IL)	89	Mark Beeman (Brandeis)	24:44.71
1985	Atlanta, GA (Emory)	Luther	98	North Central (IL)	150	James White (UMass Dartmouth)	25:35
1986	Fredonia, NY (Fredonia)	St. Thomas (MN) (2)	51	UW–La Crosse	72	Arnie Schraeder (UW–Stevens Point)	26:47
1987	Holland, MI (Hope)	North Central (IL) (7)	67	UW–La Crosse	78	Jukka Tammisuo (St. Lawrence)	24:19.3
1988	St. Louis, MO (Washington)	UW–Oshkosh	66	North Central (IL)	75	David Terronez (Augustana–IL)	24:43.2
1989	Rock Island, IL (Augustana–IL)	UW–Oshkosh (2)	55	North Central (IL)	118	David Terronez (Augustana–IL)	23:58
1990	Grinnell, IA (Grinnell)	UW–Oshkosh (3)	87	North Central (IL)	100	Seamus McElligott (Haverford)	24:46.61
1991	Newport News, VA (Christopher Newport)	Rochester (NY)	139	North Central (IL)	147	Sandu Rebenciuc (Augustana–IL)	24:26
1992	Schenectady, NY (Union)	North Central (IL) (8)	107	Rochester (NY)	114	Gary Wasserman (Nebraska Wesleyan)	24:50.4
1993	Grinnell, IA (Grinnell)	North Central (IL) (9)	32	UW–La Crosse	123	Dan Mayer (North Central–IL)	24:29.8
1994	Bethlehem, PA (Moravian)	Williams	98	North Central (IL)	110	Jeremie Perry (Williams)	24:41.8
1995	La Crosse, WI (UW–La Crosse)	Williams (2)	83	North Central (IL)	91	John Weigel (North Central–IL)	23:57.5
1996	Rock Island, IL (Augustana–IL)	UW–La Crosse	86	North Central (IL)	94	Matt Brill (North Central–IL)	23:57
1997	Cambridge, MA (MIT)	North Central (IL) (10)	94	Mount Union	96	Brett Altergott (UW–La Crosse)	25:06
1998	Carlisle, PA (Dickinson)	North Central (IL) (11)	106	Calvin	122	Erik Dieckman (North Central–IL)	24:58.27
1999	Oshkosh, WI (UW–Oshkosh)	North Central (IL) (12)	84	Keene State	100	Dave Davis (Puget Sound)	23:42.3†
2000	Spokane, WA (Whitworth)	Calvin	65	Keene State	87	Tim McCoskey (North Central–IL)	24:47.8
2001	Rock Island, IL (Augustana–IL)	UW–La Crosse (2)	80	Calvin	140	J.B. Haglund (Haverford)	24:16
2002	Northfield, MN (St. Olaf)	UW–Oshkosh (4)	66	Calvin	122	Ryan Bak (Trinity–CT)	25:01.1
2003	Hanover, IN (Hanover)	Calvin (2)	48	UW–Stevens Point	128	Josh Moen (Wartburg)	24:34.4
2004	Eau Claire, WI (UW–Eau Claire)	Calvin (3)	107	North Central (IL)	137	Josh Moen (Wartburg)	24:28.7
2005	Delaware, OH (Ohio Wesleyan)	UW–La Crosse (3)	94	Calvin	117	Neal Holtschulte (Williams)	25:13.8
2006	Wilmington, OH (Wilmington)	Calvin (4)	37	NYU	92	Macharia Yuot (Widener)	26:31
2007	Northfield, MN (St. Olaf)	NYU	128	Haverford	150	Tyler Sigl (UW–Platteville)	24:24
2008	Hanover, IN (Hanover)	SUNY Cortland	80	North Central (IL)	115	Peter Kosgei (Hamilton)	24:22.03
2009	Berea, OH (Baldwin Wallace)	North Central (IL) (13)	50	Williams	181	Ricky Flynn (Lynchburg)	25:09.8
2010	Waverly, IA (Wartburg)	Haverford	87	North Central (IL)	104	Anders Hulleberg (Haverford)	24:22.2
2011	Winneconne, WI (UW–Oshkosh)	North Central (IL) (14)	110	Haverford	172	Ben Sathre (St. Thomas–MN)	23:44.27
2012	Terre Haute, IN (Rose-Hulman)	North Central (IL) (15)	167	Calvin; Haverford	188	Tim Nelson (UW–Stout)	24:26.8
2013	Hanover, IN (Hanover)	St. Olaf	84	North Central (IL)	86	Michael LeDuc (Connecticut College)	24:29.3
2014	Wilmington, OH (Wilmington)	North Central (IL) (16)	130	St. Olaf	143	Grant Wintheiser (St. Olaf)	23:44.9
2015	Winneconne, WI (UW-Oshkosh)	UW–Eau Claire	135	Williams	144	Ian LaMere (UW–Platteville)	23:35.4
2016	Louisville, KY	North Central (IL) (17)	60	SUNY Geneseo	204	Ian LeMere (UW–Platteville)	23:40.4
2017; Details	Elsah, IL (Principia)	North Central (IL) (18)	57	UW–La Crosse	196	Darin Lau (UW–Eau Claire)	24:03.59
2018; Details	Winneconne, WI (UW-Oshkosh)	North Central (IL) (19)	43	Washington (MO)	110	Dhruvil Patel (North Central-IL)	24:24.5
2019; Details	Louisville, KY	Pomona-Pitzer	164	North Central (IL)	182	Patrick Watson (Stevenson)	24:13.9
2020	Terre Haute, IN (Rose-Hulman)	Not held because of the COVID-19 pandemic					
2021; Details	Louisville, KY	Pomona-Pitzer (2)	80	MIT	112	Alex Phillip (John Carroll)	23:27.6
2022	Lansing, MI (Olivet)	MIT	82	Wartburg	129	Alex Phillip (John Carroll)	24:37.6
2023	Carlisle, PA (Dickinson)	Pomona-Pitzer (3)	158	UW–La Crosse	159	Ethan Gregg (UW–La Crosse)	24:02.4
2024	Terre Haute, IN (Rose-Hulman)	UW-La Crosse (4)	77	Wartburg	173	Christian Patzka (UW–Whitewater)	24:01.6
2025	Spartanburg, SC (Converse)	UW-La Crosse (5)	82	SUNY Geneseo	132	Emmanuel Leblond (Johns Hopkins)	23:35.0
2026	Northfield, MN (Carleton)						

† indicates a then-NCAA record-setting time for that particular distance.

A time highlighted in ██ indicates the all-time NCAA championship record for that distance.

== Champions ==
=== Active programs ===
Team	Titles	Years
North Central (IL)	19	1975, 1976, 1978, 1979, 1981, 1982, 1987, 1992, 1993, 1997, 1998, 1999, 2009, 2011, 2012, 2014, 2016, 2017, 2018
Wisconsin–La Crosse	5	1996, 2001, 2005, 2024, 2025
Calvin	4	2000, 2003, 2004, 2006
Wisconsin–Oshkosh	4	1988, 1989, 1990, 2002
Pomona-Pitzer	3	2019, 2021, 2023
Williams	2	1994, 1995
MIT	1	2022
Wisconsin–Eau Claire	1	2015
St. Olaf	1	2013
Haverford	1	2010
Cortland	1	2008
NYU	1	2007
Rochester	1	1991
Luther	1	1985
Brandeis	1	1983
Carleton	1	1980
Occidental	1	1977
Mount Union	1	1974

=== Former programs ===
Team	Titles	Years
St. Thomas (MN)	2	1984, 1986
Ashland	1	1973

== See also ==
- NCAA Men's Cross Country Championships (Division I, Division II)
- NCAA Women's Cross Country Championships (Division I, Division II, Division III)
- Pre-NCAA Cross Country Champions
- NAIA Cross Country Championships (Men, Women)
