= Grand Valley State Lakers =

- University: Grand Valley State University
- NCAA: Division II
- Conference: Great Lakes Intercollegiate Athletic Conference
- Athletic director: Keri Becker
- Location: Allendale, Michigan
- Varsity teams: 22
- Football stadium: Lubbers Stadium
- Basketball arena: GVSU Fieldhouse
- Nickname: Lakers
- Colors: Blue, black, and white
- Mascot: Louie the Laker
- Fight song: GVSU Victory
- Website: gvsulakers.com

The Grand Valley State Lakers are the intercollegiate athletic teams of Grand Valley State University, located in Allendale, Michigan, United States. The GVSU Lakers compete at the NCAA Division II level and are members of the Great Lakes Intercollegiate Athletic Conference (GLIAC).

Grand Valley's varsity athletic teams have won 30 National Championships in 10 sports and have been National Runners-up 21 times in 10 sports. GVSU has also won the prestigious National Association of Collegiate Directors of Athletics (NACDA) Directors' Cup for NCAA Division II schools in 2004, 2005, 2006, 2007, 2008, 2009, 2010, 2011, 2014, 2015, 2016, 2017, 2019, and 2022. They finished second in 2002, 2003, 2012, 2013 and 2018. The cup is awarded to the top athletic programs based on overall team national finishes. Grand Valley is the first college east of the Mississippi River to win the Directors' Cup for NCAA Division II.

The official mascot of Grand Valley State is Louie the Laker and the official fight song is "GVSU Victory!" Grand Valley's rivals include the Ferris State Bulldogs, Saginaw Valley State Cardinals, Davenport Panthers, and Northwest Missouri State Bearcats.

== Varsity sports ==
GVSU currently fields 21 varsity teams, with a 22nd coming in 2024 in the following sports:

Men's sports	Women's sports
Baseball	Basketball
Basketball	Cross country
Cross country	Golf
Football	Lacrosse
Golf	Soccer
Swimming and diving	Swimming and diving
Tennis	Softball
Track and field^{1}	Tennis
Wrestling	Track and field^{1}
	Volleyball
	Wrestling
^{1} – includes both indoor and outdoor

=== Baseball ===
The Lakers have a moderately successful baseball program, frequenting appearances in the Division II tournament. In 2004, the Lakers made it all the way to the Division II national championship, eventually losing to Delta State.

=== Basketball ===
==== Men's basketball ====
The GVSU men's 2005–2006 basketball team had their outstanding season cut short when they were upset early in the NCAA D2 Regional Playoffs. GV men were ranked number four in the nation in the final poll heading into the playoffs. The men ended their season with a 27–4 mark and second year coach Ric Wesley was named the BCAM College Coach of the Year for his efforts. Ric has led the Lakers to a 45–14 record over his initial two years and it is the best two-year total of any basketball coach in their first two years at GV.

In 1977 the men's basketball team reached the Final Four of the NAIA Division I Tournament.

In 2019, the men's basketball team won the Great Lakes Intercollegiate Athletic Conference Tournament to qualify for the Division 2 NCAA Tournament, defeating #21 Ashland University, University of Wisconsin-Parkside, and #8 Davenport University.

==== Women's basketball ====
The GVSU women's basketball team won their first NCAA Division II National Championship in the 2005–2006 season with a 58–52 win over American International College. The Lakers finished with a school best 33–3 overall record, which included a win streak of 22 games, also a school record. The Lakers in the 04–05 season lost in the Elite Eight going 28–6 over-all. Coach Dawn Plitzuweit was voted the Russell Athletic/WBCA National Coach of the Year in 2005 and after the National Championship season was voted both the BCAM and the Molten/WDIIB National Coach of the Year. She was also honored by being selected as the USA Women's Basketball Trials Court Coach. In both the 04–05 and 05–06 campaigns the Lakers were led on the court by their two time All-American Nikki Reams. The Lakers would win a GLIAC regular season championship in the 2018–19 season, advancing to the NCAA Sweet 16 in a season where fourth-year head coach Mike Williams picked up his 100th career win as a Laker.

=== Football ===
Grand Valley State went to their first national title game in 2001, losing to the University of North Dakota. They won their first Division II national championship in 2002 and their second in 2003. The team added a third national championship in 2005, finishing the season 13–0 and tying the NCAA record for most wins over a four-year period with 51. They earned their fourth title in 2006, defeating Northwest Missouri State University. In the 2007 season, GVSU broke the Division II record for most consecutive wins with 40. The previous record of 34 was set by Hillsdale College and had stood since 1957. On December 8, 2007, the streak was broken by their post season rival Northwest Missouri State University with a 34–16 loss.

=== Women's soccer ===
The varsity women's soccer team has won seven National Championships (2009, 2010, 2013, 2014, 2015, 2019, 2021), finishing as national runner-up in 2018 after a 1–0 loss in the finals, ending their historic season 25–1–1, the most wins in a season for the powerhouse. They ended the 2005 season with a GLIAC Championship and a trip to the NCAA Division II Elite Eight. In 2006 the team was GLIAC co-champion and was ranked eighth in the nation at the end of the regular season. The Lakers returned to the NCAA Division II tournament and finished as national runner-up—the first women's soccer team from a four-year college in Michigan to be a national finalist.

In 2009, the Lakers returned to the Division II Championship game, this time taking home their first championship with a 1–0 victory over Cal State Dominguez Hills. In 2010, the Lakers set out to defend their National Title. They finished the regular season with a 15–1–2 record, and an overall record of 22–1–2, successfully claiming their second title in as many years. In doing so, they set a school and NCAA Division II record for most shutouts in a season (22), outscored opponents a staggering 93–5, and scored a tournament record 17 goals in the postseason.

=== Track & field / Cross country ===
The varsity men's & women's track & cross country teams have dominated Division II since the hiring of Jerry Baltes as their head coach in 1999. Since then, the Lakers have won 16 National Championships, 20 National Runner-Up Finishes, 43 Regional Championships, 129 GLIAC Team Championships, and 73 individual National Champions. The USTFCCCA named the Women's NCAA Division II Program of the Year Award, which is awarded to the program that finishes with the best combined finish at the Cross Country, Indoor Track, and Outdoor Track NCAA Division II Championships within a school year. The women's program finished first or second every year the award has been given out, beginning in 2008-2009. During the 2010-11 academic year, Baltes’ women's squad became the first in Division II history to win Cross Country, Indoor Track & Outdoor Track national championships in the same season.

=== Women's volleyball ===
The women's volleyball team won its first Division II National Championship in 2005 against host school University of Nebraska-Kearney in front of an NCAA D2 record crowd of 5,025 fans. The 2005 volleyball team is the first women's team to win a National Championship for the school. The Lakers ended their season with a 32–6 record. Coach Deanne Scanlon was voted the Tachikara/AVCA D2 National Coach of the Year for her efforts in guiding the Lakers. The Lakers have a 20–6 overall record for the NCAA D2 Playoffs and are currently in a streak of 13 straight years with winning seasons.

== Club sports ==
=== Men's Ice Hockey ===
GVSU has had a club hockey team since the mid-1970s. As the NCAA does not offer Division II ice hockey, GVSU participates in the American Collegiate Hockey Association within the Great Midwest Hockey League, which has produced the ACHA DII champion in 2004, 2005, 2006, 2007, 2008, 2009, 2010, 2011, and 2013. In 2006–2007, GVSU added an ACHA Division III team which competes in the Michigan Collegiate Hockey Conference (MCHC). Grand Valley used to be a member of the Great Lakes Intercollegiate Hockey Association and was the GLIHA Tournament Champions in 2003 and placed second in 2005. In 2007, the Lakers were invited to the ACHA DII National Championships for the first time. In 2011, GVSU won the ACHA DII National Championship, beating Michigan State 6–1 in the Finals. The Lakers finished as national runner-up in 2012 and 2013. The hockey team is a "varsity club", in that it is not an official NCAA sport, but is run as a varsity program and maintains the third-highest average attendance of all GVSU sports (behind Football and Basketball).

=== Rowing ===
Founded in 1964 by Coach Charles Irwin, rowing was the first varsity sport at Grand Valley State University. Today GVSU now supports a successful coed club crew. Each year the team travels around the nation and world to compete against other top collegiate crews. In the fall it competes in Boston at the Head of the Charles Regatta, regularly earning medals in the Men's and Women's Collegiate 8+s, as well as occasionally fielding an alumni entry.

Each spring GVSU hosts the Lubbers Cup Regatta in Spring Lake, Michigan. The Cup is named for the former GVSU president, Arend Lubbers. The team has been successful in the past and took fifth in the Dad Vails points trophy in 2006, and second to Purdue in 2008. The top men's and women's Varsity Eight were competitors at the prestigious Henley Royal Regatta in England in 2004 and 2008. In 2004 the men's and women's teams took bronze at the International Race of Eights in Zagreb, Croatia.

Several alumni of the rowing program at GVSU have gone on to race at the elite level. Sarah Zelenka was a member of the 2012 US Summer Olympic Team, taking 4th in the pair. Dana Schmunk raced in the 2002 and 2004 World Championships.

In 2012, Grand Valley won the American College Rowing Association National Championship for the fifth year in a row, winning the Women's Team Points Championship and Men's Team placing third.

=== Wrestling ===
GVSU has a non-varsity wrestling team which has done well in National Collegiate Wrestling Association nationals the past five years. The 2006 NCWA national championships, which were held March 3–4, 2006 at the Deltaplex, were hosted by GVSU. GVSU won the team championship with 188 points. The Lakers also won the NCWA team championship in 2001, 2002, 2007, and 2008.

=== Men's lacrosse ===
The GVSU Men's Club Lacrosse team competes at the Division 2 of Men's Collegiate Lacrosse Association in the Central Collegiate Lacrosse Association (CCLA). In 2007 The Lakers finished 3rd losing to eventual conference champions, University of Dayton. In 2008 after a coaching change and structuring the program to run like a varsity program (although competing at a club level) the GVSU Men's Lacrosse team won the CCLA conference title and earned their first bid to play in the Men's Collegiate Lacrosse Association (MCLA) national championship tournament featuring teams from throughout the US and Canada. The Lakers went into the championship tournament ranked 2nd in America and with an 18–0 record in MCLA play. After a first round bye the Lakers defeated Southwestern University, and were slotted to play a re-match against The University of St. Thomas (who the Lakers defeated earlier in the season by 1 in overtime) In Texas Stadium (Former Home of the Dallas Cowboys), the Lakers went on to win the game earning a spot to play in the MCLA Div. 2 National Championship game. The Lakers season ended with the first league loss of the season coming in the National Championship to Westminster University resulting in a 20–1 season, scoring over 300 goals. The 2009 Laker lacrosse team finished with a 10–4 record, with losses coming to the 1–4 nationally ranked teams. The Lakers ended their season in the CCLA Division 2 semi-final losing to national runners up University of Dayton. Due to powers beyond their control, the Lakers also were slightly edged from being invited to the National Championship tournament despite having its only 4 losses to the nations top 4 teams. The 2010 Laker Lacrosse team finished with a record of 15–4, going undefeated in CCLA play, winning the CCLA North Championship, and taking second place in the CCLA tournament. The Lakers were invited to participate for their 2nd time in the MCLA National Championship tournament. The Lakers were ousted early from the tournament by cross town rivals Davenport Panthers who were finally able to get the best of the Lakers in their third meeting of the season. In 2011 The Lakers jumped out to impressive early season victories and earned a top national ranking for a three-month period. The Lakers finished the regular season undefeated, won the CCLA conference tournament, and earned a number one seed to the MCLA National Championship tournament. Unfortunately the 2011 undefeated streak and season ended in a quadruple overtime loss in the national semifinal in Denver, CO at the hands of eventual National Champions, Davenport Panthers by a 16–15 score. The 2011 season featured a 19–1 record, 5 MCLA All-Americans, 6 CCLA All-Conference players, and over 400 goals scored throughout the year (higher than any NCAA/MCLA program, at any division). Since 2008 the Lakers feature a 64–11 record, have had 13 players receive All-American mentions, have yet to finish outside the national top-ten rankings, and have not lost a home contest since 2009.

=== Men's Water Polo ===
GVSU has a club water polo team which consistently competes for conference and national championships. They compete under the auspices of the Collegiate Water Polo Association. As of 2007, they have won 5 straight conference championships in the Great Lakes Division. In 2005 they won the national championship by defeating Michigan State University at Williams College. In 2006, they were national runners-up, losing to Michigan State University 6–4 at Miami (OH) University.

=== Women's Water Polo ===
The GVSU women's water polo club has appeared in 10 Collegiate Water Polo Association Midwest Division championship games, winning the division title twice (2016 and 2017).

=== Cheerleading ===
The Grand Valley State Cheerleading (GVC) program includes two teams: a coed and an all-girl squad, each consisting of approximately 20 athletes, but it may vary from year to year. Both squads cheer at all home football games, events throughout homecoming week, and other select events. They also split time between men's and women's basketball games, with the coed squad at men's games, and all-girl at women's games. They are first and foremost a sideline cheer program, but have also competed at the national level since 2005 at the NCA/NDA Collegiate National Championship in Daytona Beach, Florida. Where the Coed Team won the 2016 National Championship for their division.

Since 2008, GVC has enjoyed much success at the national competition from both its coed and all-girl squads:

	Coed	All-girl
Year	Place	Place
2008	3rd	5th
2009	4th	6th
2010	4th	6th
2011	4th	3rd
2012	4th	4th
2013	3rd	3rd
2014	5th	4th

== National finalists ==
=== Varsity team national championships (29) ===
- 2002: Football – NCAA Division II
- 2003: Football – NCAA Division II
- 2005: Football – NCAA Division II
- 2005: Women's Volleyball – NCAA Division II
- 2006: Women's Basketball – NCAA Division II
- 2006: Football – NCAA Division II
- 2009: Women's Soccer – NCAA Division II
- 2010: Women's Soccer – NCAA Division II
- 2010: Women's Cross Country – NCAA Division II
- 2011: Women's Indoor Track – NCAA Division II
- 2011: Women's Outdoor Track – NCAA Division II
- 2012: Women's Indoor Track – NCAA Division II
- 2012: Women's Outdoor Track – NCAA Division II
- 2012: Women's Cross Country – NCAA Division II
- 2013: Women's Cross Country – NCAA Division II
- 2013: Women's Soccer – NCAA Division II
- 2014: Women's Soccer – NCAA Division II
- 2014: Women's Cross Country – NCAA Division II
- 2015: Women's Soccer – NCAA Division II
- 2016: Women's Cross Country – NCAA Division II
- 2018: Women's Cross Country – NCAA Division II
- 2018: Men's Cross Country – NCAA Division II
- 2019: Women's Soccer – NCAA Division II
- 2021: Men's Cross Country – NCAA Division II
- 2021: Men's Outdoor Track – NCAA Division II
- 2021: Women's Indoor Track – NCAA Division II
- 2021: Women's Soccer – NCAA Division II
- 2022: Men's Indoor Track – NCAA Division II
- 2023: Women's Cross Country - NCAA Division II
- 2025: Women’s basketball - NCAA Division II
- 2026: Women’s basketball - NCAA Division II

=== Varsity team national runners-up (25) ===
- 1977: Wrestling – NAIA
- 1978: Wrestling – NAIA
- 2001: Football – NCAA Division II
- 2002: Softball – NCAA Division II
- 2004: Baseball – NCAA Division II
- 2005: Women's Cross Country – NCAA Division II
- 2005: Women's Golf – NCAA Division II
- 2006: Women's Soccer – NCAA Division II
- 2009: Women's Indoor Track – NCAA Division II
- 2009: Women's Golf – NCAA Division II
- 2009: Women's Cross Country – NCAA Division II
- 2009: Football – NCAA Division II
- 2010: Women's Indoor Track – NCAA Division II
- 2011: Women's Soccer – NCAA Division II
- 2013: Men's Cross Country – NCAA Division II
- 2014: Men's Cross Country – NCAA Division II
- 2015: Men's Indoor Track – NCAA Division II
- 2015: Women's Cross Country – NCAA Division II
- 2016: Women's Soccer – NCAA Division II
- 2016: Men's Cross Country – NCAA Division II
- 2017: Men's Cross Country - NCAA Division II
- 2018: Women's Soccer - NCAA Division II
- 2019: Women's Indoor Track - NCAA Division II
- 2021: Men's Indoor Track - NCAA Division II
- 2021: Women's Outdoor Track - NCAA Division II
- 2022: Women's Outdoor Track - NCAA Division II
- 2022: Women's Cross Country - NCAA Division II

=== Club team national championships (15) ===
- 2001: Wrestling – NCWA
- 2002: Wrestling – NCWA
- 2005: Men's Water Polo – CWPA-NCCC
- 2006: Wrestling – NCWA
- 2007: Wrestling – NWCA Duals-NCWA
- 2007: Wrestling – NCWA
- 2007: Dodgeball – NCDA
- 2008: Wrestling – NWCA Duals-NCWA
- 2008: Wrestling – NCWA
- 2008: Dodgeball – NCDA
- 2009: Wrestling – NWCA Duals-NCWA
- 2009: Dodgeball – NCDA
- 2009: Roller Hockey – NCRHA Division II
- 2010: Dodgeball – NCDA
- 2011: Men's Ice Hockey – ACHA Division II
- 2013: Dodgeball – NCDA
- 2014: Dodgeball – NCDA
- 2014: Lacrosse – MCLA Division II
- 2016: Coed Cheerleading - NCA Division II Coed

=== Club team national runners-up (9) ===
- 2004: Wrestling – NCWA
- 2005: Wrestling – NCWA
- 2006: Wrestling – NWCA Duals-NCWA
- 2006: Men's Water Polo – CWPA-NCCC
- 2008: Men's Lacrosse – MCLA Division II
- 2009: Wrestling – NCWA
- 2012: Men's Ice Hockey – ACHA Division II
- 2012: Men's Lacrosse – MCLA Division II
- 2013: Men's Ice Hockey – ACHA Division II

== Fight song ==
"GVSU Victory!" which is sometimes referred to as "Grand Valley Victory" is the fight song for the Grand Valley State University Lakers.

The music was composed by GVSU (then GVSC) band director William Root. The lyrics were written by GVSC band members Maris Tracy and Kathleen Ure. The lyrics by Tracy and Ure were selected as the winning submission on October 25, 1978 after a contest sponsored by the Office of Student Life and the Student Senate.

GVSU Victory has undergone minor changes since it was officially introduced in 1978. Two versions of the song currently exist, although there is no difference in the lyrics, and only minor variations in the music.

The song has been sung, incorrectly, with the word "on" replacing the word "at" in the last line of the first stanza. Additionally, some people chant "Let's Go Blue Fight!" between the two stanzas. However, this prevents the singer from correctly beginning the second without truncating "We want a" from the first line.

Although "GO LAKERS!" has been part of the song since its inception, in actuality, it is almost always absent.
