= Braddy Field =

Baseball venue in Jackson, Mississippi

- Interactive map of Braddy Field
- Full name: Robert "Bob" Braddy Field
- Former names: Jackson State University Baseball Complex (2006-2009)
- Location: John R. Lynch Street and Poindexter Avenue, Jackson, Mississippi, USA
- Coordinates: 32.296316°N 90.201391°W
- Owner: Jackson State University
- Operator: Jackson State University
- Capacity: 800
- Surface: Natural grass
- Scoreboard: Electronic
- Field size: 325 ft. (LF); 365 ft. (LCF); 400 ft. (CF); 365 ft. (RCF); 325 ft. (RF)

Construction
- Opened: 2006

Tenant
- Jackson State Tigers baseball (NCAA DI SWAC) (2006-present)

Robert "Bob" Braddy Field is a baseball venue in Jackson, Mississippi, United States. It is home to the Jackson State Tigers baseball team of the NCAA Division I Southwestern Athletic Conference. Originally known as Jackson State University Baseball Complex, it was renamed prior to the 2010 season for Jackson State athletic director Robert Braddy. Opened in 2006, the facility has a capacity of 800 spectators.

In addition to Jackson State baseball, the field has hosted events of the Mississippi RBI (Reviving Baseball in Inner Cities) Program.

== See also ==
- List of NCAA Division I baseball venues
