= 2024 NAIA indoor track and field championships =

College track and field competition

- Dates: February 29-March 2, 2024
- Host city: Brookings, South Dakota
- Venue: Sanford-Jackrabbit Athletic Complex
- Events: 42

The 2024 NAIA indoor track and field championships were the 59th NAIA men's indoor track and field championship and the 44th NAIA women's indoor track and field championship, held at the Sanford-Jackrabbit Athletic Complex on the campus of South Dakota State University in Brookings, South Dakota.. The event consisted of 21 different men's and women's indoor track and field events contested from February 29 to March 2, 2024.

== Results ==
=== Men's results ===
==== 60 meters ====
- Final results shown, not prelims

Rank	Name	University	Time	Team score
1st place, gold medalist(s)				
2nd place, silver medalist(s)				
3rd place, bronze medalist(s)				
4				
5				
6				
7				
8				

==== 200 meters ====
- Final results shown, not prelims

Rank	Name	University	Time	Team score
1st place, gold medalist(s)				
2nd place, silver medalist(s)				
3rd place, bronze medalist(s)				
4				
5				
6				
7				
8				

==== 400 meters ====
- Final results shown, not prelims

Rank	Name	University	Time	Team score
1st place, gold medalist(s)				
2nd place, silver medalist(s)				
3rd place, bronze medalist(s)				
4				
5				
6				
7				
8				

==== 600 meters ====
- Final results shown, not prelims

Rank	Name	University	Time	Team score
1st place, gold medalist(s)				
2nd place, silver medalist(s)				
3rd place, bronze medalist(s)				
4				
5				
6				
7				
8				

==== 800 meters ====
- Final results shown, not prelims

Rank	Name	University	Time	Team score
1st place, gold medalist(s)				
2nd place, silver medalist(s)				
3rd place, bronze medalist(s)				
4				
5				
6				
7				
8				

==== 1000 meters ====
- Final results shown, not prelims

Rank	Name	University	Time	Team score
1st place, gold medalist(s)				
2nd place, silver medalist(s)				
3rd place, bronze medalist(s)				
4				
5				
6				
7				
8				

==== Mile ====
- Final results shown, not prelims

Rank	Name	University	Time	Team score
1st place, gold medalist(s)				
2nd place, silver medalist(s)				
3rd place, bronze medalist(s)				
4				
5				
6				
7				
8				
9				
10				

==== 3000 meters ====
- Final results shown, not prelims

Rank	Name	University	Time	Team score
1st place, gold medalist(s)				
2nd place, silver medalist(s)				
3rd place, bronze medalist(s)				
4				
5				
6				
7				
8				
9				
10				
11				
12				

==== 5000 meters ====
- Final results shown, not prelims

Rank	Name	University	Time	Team score
1st place, gold medalist(s)				
2nd place, silver medalist(s)				
3rd place, bronze medalist(s)				
4				
5				
6				
7				
8				
9				
10				
11				
12				

==== 60 meter hurdles ====
- Final results shown, not prelims

Rank	Name	University	Time	Team score
1st place, gold medalist(s)				
2nd place, silver medalist(s)				
3rd place, bronze medalist(s)				
4				
5				
6				
7				
8				

==== 4 x 400 meters relay ====
- Final results shown, not prelims

Rank	University	Time	Team score
1st place, gold medalist(s)			
2nd place, silver medalist(s)			
3rd place, bronze medalist(s)			
4			
5			
6			
7			
8			

==== 4 x 800 meters relay ====
- Final results shown, not prelims

Rank	University	Time	Team score
1st place, gold medalist(s)			
2nd place, silver medalist(s)			
3rd place, bronze medalist(s)			
4			
5			
6			
7			
8			

==== Distance medley relay ====
- Final results shown, not prelims

Rank	University	Time	Team score
1st place, gold medalist(s)			
2nd place, silver medalist(s)			
3rd place, bronze medalist(s)			
4			
5			
6			
7			
8			
9			
10			
11			
12			

==== High jump ====
- Final results shown, not prelims

Rank	Name	University	Best jump	Team score
1st place, gold medalist(s)			0.00 m (0 in)	
2nd place, silver medalist(s)			0.00 m (0 in)	
3rd place, bronze medalist(s)			0.00 m (0 in)	
4			0.00 m (0 in)	
5			0.00 m (0 in)	
6			0.00 m (0 in)	
7			0.00 m (0 in)	
8			0.00 m (0 in)	
9			0.00 m (0 in)	
10			0.00 m (0 in)	
11			0.00 m (0 in)	
12			0.00 m (0 in)	
13			0.00 m (0 in)	
14			0.00 m (0 in)	
15			0.00 m (0 in)	
16			0.00 m (0 in)	

==== Pole vault ====
- Final results shown, not prelims

Rank	Name	University	Best jump	Team score
1st place, gold medalist(s)			0.00 m (0 in)	
2nd place, silver medalist(s)			0.00 m (0 in)	
3rd place, bronze medalist(s)			0.00 m (0 in)	
4			0.00 m (0 in)	
5			0.00 m (0 in)	
6			0.00 m (0 in)	
7			0.00 m (0 in)	
8			0.00 m (0 in)	
9			0.00 m (0 in)	
10			0.00 m (0 in)	
11			0.00 m (0 in)	
12			0.00 m (0 in)	
13			0.00 m (0 in)	
14			0.00 m (0 in)	
15			0.00 m (0 in)	
16			0.00 m (0 in)	

==== Long jump ====
- Final results shown, not prelims

Rank	Name	University	Best jump	Team score
1st place, gold medalist(s)			0.00 m (0 in)	
2nd place, silver medalist(s)			0.00 m (0 in)	
3rd place, bronze medalist(s)			0.00 m (0 in)	
4			0.00 m (0 in)	
5			0.00 m (0 in)	
6			0.00 m (0 in)	
7			0.00 m (0 in)	
8			0.00 m (0 in)	
9			0.00 m (0 in)	
10			0.00 m (0 in)	
11			0.00 m (0 in)	
12			0.00 m (0 in)	
13			0.00 m (0 in)	
14			0.00 m (0 in)	
15			0.00 m (0 in)	
16			0.00 m (0 in)	

==== Triple jump ====
- Final results shown, not prelims

Rank	Name	University	Best jump	Team score
1st place, gold medalist(s)			0.00 m (0 in)	
2nd place, silver medalist(s)			0.00 m (0 in)	
3rd place, bronze medalist(s)			0.00 m (0 in)	
4			0.00 m (0 in)	
5			0.00 m (0 in)	
6			0.00 m (0 in)	
7			0.00 m (0 in)	
8			0.00 m (0 in)	
9			0.00 m (0 in)	
10			0.00 m (0 in)	
11			0.00 m (0 in)	
12			0.00 m (0 in)	
13			0.00 m (0 in)	
14			0.00 m (0 in)	
15			0.00 m (0 in)	
16			0.00 m (0 in)	

==== Shot put ====
- Final results shown, not prelims

Rank	Name	University	Best throw	Team score
1st place, gold medalist(s)			0.00 m (0 in)	
2nd place, silver medalist(s)			0.00 m (0 in)	
3rd place, bronze medalist(s)			0.00 m (0 in)	
4			0.00 m (0 in)	
5			0.00 m (0 in)	
6			0.00 m (0 in)	
7			0.00 m (0 in)	
8			0.00 m (0 in)	
9			0.00 m (0 in)	
10			0.00 m (0 in)	
11			0.00 m (0 in)	
12			0.00 m (0 in)	
13			0.00 m (0 in)	
14			0.00 m (0 in)	
15			0.00 m (0 in)	
16			0.00 m (0 in)	

==== Weight throw ====
- Final results shown, not prelims

Rank	Name	University	Best throw	Team score
1st place, gold medalist(s)			0.00 m (0 in)	
2nd place, silver medalist(s)			0.00 m (0 in)	
3rd place, bronze medalist(s)			0.00 m (0 in)	
4			0.00 m (0 in)	
5			0.00 m (0 in)	
6			0.00 m (0 in)	
7			0.00 m (0 in)	
8			0.00 m (0 in)	
9			0.00 m (0 in)	
10			0.00 m (0 in)	
11			0.00 m (0 in)	
12			0.00 m (0 in)	
13			0.00 m (0 in)	
14			0.00 m (0 in)	
15			0.00 m (0 in)	
16			0.00 m (0 in)	

==== Heptathlon ====
- Final results shown, not prelims

Rank	Name	University	Overall points	60 m	LJ	SP	HJ	60 m H	PV	1000 m
1st place, gold medalist(s)				000; 0.00	0000; 0.00 m (0 in)	000; 00.00 m (0 in)	000; 0.00 m (0 in)	0000; 0.00	000; 0.00 m (0 in)	000; 0:00.00
2nd place, silver medalist(s)				000; 0.00	000; 0.00 m (0 in)	000; 0.00 m (0 in)	000; 0.00 m (0 in)	000; 0.00	000; 0.00 m (0 in)	000; 0:00.00
3rd place, bronze medalist(s)				000; 0.00	000; 0.00 m (0 in)	000; 0.00 m (0 in)	000; 0.00 m (0 in)	000; 0.00	000; 0.00 m (0 in)	000; 0:00.00
4				000; 0.00	000; 0.00 m (0 in)	000; 0.00 m (0 in)	000; 0.00 m (0 in)	000; 0.00	000; 0.00 m (0 in)	000; 0:00.00
5				000; 0.00	000; 0.00 m (0 in)	000; 0.00 m (0 in)	000; 0.00 m (0 in)	000; 0.00	000; 0.00 m (0 in)	000; 0:00.00
6				000; 0.00	000; 0.00 m (0 in)	000; 0.00 m (0 in)	000; 0.00 m (0 in)	000; 0.00	000; 0.00 m (0 in)	000; 0:00.00
7				000; 0.00	000; 0.00 m (0 in)	000; 0.00 m (0 in)	000; 0.00 m (0 in)	000; 0.00	000; 0.00 m (0 in)	000; 0:00.00
8				000; 0.00	000; 0.00 m (0 in)	000; 0.00 m (0 in)	000; 0.00 m (0 in)	000; 0.00	000; 0.00 m (0 in)	000; 0:00.00
9				000; 0.00	000; 0.00 m (0 in)	000; 0.00 m (0 in)	000; 0.00 m (0 in)	000; 0.00	000; 0.00 m (0 in)	000; 0:00.00
10				000; 0.00	000; 0.00 m (0 in)	000; 0.00 m (0 in)	000; 0.00 m (0 in)	000; 0.00	000; 0.00 m (0 in)	000; 0:00.00
11				000; 0.00	000; 0.00 m (0 in)	000; 0.00 m (0 in)	000; 0.00 m (0 in)	000; 0.00	000; 0.00 m (0 in)	000; 0:00.00
12				000; 0.00	000; 0.00 m (0 in)	000; 0.00 m (0 in)	000; 0.00 m (0 in)	000; 0.00	000; 0.00 m (0 in)	000; 0:00.00
13				000; 0.00	000; 0.00 m (0 in)	000; 0.00 m (0 in)	000; 0.00 m (0 in)	000; 0.00	000; 0.00 m (0 in)	000; 0:00.00
14				000; 0.00	000; 0.00 m (0 in)	000; 0.00 m (0 in)	000; 0.00 m (0 in)	000; 0.00	000; 0.00 m (0 in)	000; 0:00.00
15				000; 0.00	000; 0.00 m (0 in)	000; 0.00 m (0 in)	000; 0.00 m (0 in)	000; 0.00	000; 0.00 m (0 in)	000; 0:00.00
16				000; 0.00	000; 0.00 m (0 in)	000; 0.00 m (0 in)	000; 0.00 m (0 in)	000; 0.00	000; 0.00 m (0 in)	000; 0:00.00

==== 3000 meters racewalk ====
- Final results shown, not prelims

Rank	Name	University	Time	Team score
1st place, gold medalist(s)				
2nd place, silver medalist(s)				
3rd place, bronze medalist(s)				
4				
5				
6				
7				
8				
9				
10				
11				
12				
13				
14				
15				
16				

=== Men's team scores ===
- Top 10 and ties shown

Rank	University	Team score
1st place, gold medalist(s)		00 points
2nd place, silver medalist(s)		00 points
3rd place, bronze medalist(s)		00 points
4		00 points
5		00 points
6		00 points
7		00 points
8		00 points
9		00 points
10		00 points

=== Women's results ===
==== 60 meters ====
- Final results shown, not prelims

Rank	Name	University	Time	Team score
1st place, gold medalist(s)				
2nd place, silver medalist(s)				
3rd place, bronze medalist(s)				
4				
5				
6				
7				
8				

==== 200 meters ====
- Final results shown, not prelims

Rank	Name	University	Time	Team score
1st place, gold medalist(s)				
2nd place, silver medalist(s)				
3rd place, bronze medalist(s)				
4				
5				
6				
7				
8				

==== 400 meters ====
- Final results shown, not prelims

Rank	Name	University	Time	Team score
1st place, gold medalist(s)				
2nd place, silver medalist(s)				
3rd place, bronze medalist(s)				
4				
5				
6				
7				
8				

==== 600 meters ====
- Final results shown, not prelims

Rank	Name	University	Time	Team score
1st place, gold medalist(s)				
2nd place, silver medalist(s)				
3rd place, bronze medalist(s)				
4				
5				
6				
7				
8				

==== 800 meters ====
- Final results shown, not prelims

Rank	Name	University	Time	Team score
1st place, gold medalist(s)				
2nd place, silver medalist(s)				
3rd place, bronze medalist(s)				
4				
5				
6				
7				
8				

==== 1000 meters ====
- Final results shown, not prelims

Rank	Name	University	Time	Team score
1st place, gold medalist(s)				
2nd place, silver medalist(s)				
3rd place, bronze medalist(s)				
4				
5				
6				
7				
8				

==== Mile ====
- Final results shown, not prelims

Rank	Name	University	Time	Team score
1st place, gold medalist(s)				
2nd place, silver medalist(s)				
3rd place, bronze medalist(s)				
4				
5				
6				
7				
8				
9				
10				

==== 3000 meters ====
- Final results shown, not prelims

Rank	Name	University	Time	Team score
1st place, gold medalist(s)				
2nd place, silver medalist(s)				
3rd place, bronze medalist(s)				
4				
5				
6				
7				
8				
9				
10				
11				
12				

==== 5000 meters ====
- Final results shown, not prelims

Rank	Name	University	Time	Team score
1st place, gold medalist(s)				
2nd place, silver medalist(s)				
3rd place, bronze medalist(s)				
4				
5				
6				
7				
8				
9				
10				
11				
12				

==== 60 meter hurdles ====
- Final results shown, not prelims

Rank	Name	University	Time	Team score
1st place, gold medalist(s)				
2nd place, silver medalist(s)				
3rd place, bronze medalist(s)				
4				
5				
6				
7				
8				

==== 4 x 400 meters relay ====
- Final results shown, not prelims

Rank	University	Time	Team score
1st place, gold medalist(s)			
2nd place, silver medalist(s)			
3rd place, bronze medalist(s)			
4			
5			
6			
7			
8			

==== 4 x 800 meters relay ====
- Final results shown, not prelims

Rank	University	Time	Team score
1st place, gold medalist(s)			
2nd place, silver medalist(s)			
3rd place, bronze medalist(s)			
4			
5			
6			
7			
8			

==== Distance medley relay ====
- Final results shown, not prelims

Rank	University	Time	Team score
1st place, gold medalist(s)			
2nd place, silver medalist(s)			
3rd place, bronze medalist(s)			
4			
5			
6			
7			
8			
9			
10			
11			
12			

==== High jump ====
- Final results shown, not prelims

Rank	Name	University	Best jump	Team score
1st place, gold medalist(s)			0.00 m (0 in)	
2nd place, silver medalist(s)			0.00 m (0 in)	
3rd place, bronze medalist(s)			0.00 m (0 in)	
4			0.00 m (0 in)	
5			0.00 m (0 in)	
6			0.00 m (0 in)	
7			0.00 m (0 in)	
8			0.00 m (0 in)	
9			0.00 m (0 in)	
10			0.00 m (0 in)	
11			0.00 m (0 in)	
12			0.00 m (0 in)	
13			0.00 m (0 in)	
14			0.00 m (0 in)	
15			0.00 m (0 in)	
16			0.00 m (0 in)	

==== Pole vault ====
- Final results shown, not prelims

Rank	Name	University	Best jump	Team score
1st place, gold medalist(s)			0.00 m (0 in)	
2nd place, silver medalist(s)			0.00 m (0 in)	
3rd place, bronze medalist(s)			0.00 m (0 in)	
4			0.00 m (0 in)	
5			0.00 m (0 in)	
6			0.00 m (0 in)	
7			0.00 m (0 in)	
8			0.00 m (0 in)	
9			0.00 m (0 in)	
10			0.00 m (0 in)	
11			0.00 m (0 in)	
12			0.00 m (0 in)	
13			0.00 m (0 in)	
14			0.00 m (0 in)	
15			0.00 m (0 in)	
16			0.00 m (0 in)	

==== Long jump ====
- Final results shown, not prelims

Rank	Name	University	Best jump	Team score
1st place, gold medalist(s)			0.00 m (0 in)	
2nd place, silver medalist(s)			0.00 m (0 in)	
3rd place, bronze medalist(s)			0.00 m (0 in)	
4			0.00 m (0 in)	
5			0.00 m (0 in)	
6			0.00 m (0 in)	
7			0.00 m (0 in)	
8			0.00 m (0 in)	
9			00.00 m (0 in)	
10			00.00 m (0 in)	
11			00.00 m (0 in)	
12			00.00 m (0 in)	
13			00.00 m (0 in)	
14			00.00 m (0 in)	
15			00.00 m (0 in)	
16			00.00 m (0 in)	

==== Triple jump ====
- Final results shown, not prelims

Rank	Name	University	Best jump	Team score
1st place, gold medalist(s)			00.00 m (0 in)	
2nd place, silver medalist(s)			00.00 m (0 in)	
3rd place, bronze medalist(s)			00.00 m (0 in)	
4			00.00 m (0 in)	
5			00.00 m (0 in)	
6			00.00 m (0 in)	
7			00.00 m (0 in)	
8			00.00 m (0 in)	
9			00.00 m (0 in)	
10			00.00 m (0 in)	
11			00.00 m (0 in)	
12			00.00 m (0 in)	
13			00.00 m (0 in)	
14			00.00 m (0 in)	
15			00.00 m (0 in)	
16			00.00 m (0 in)	

==== Weight throw ====
- Final results shown, not prelims

Rank	Name	University	Best Throw	Team score
1st place, gold medalist(s)			0.00 m (0 in)	
2nd place, silver medalist(s)			0.00 m (0 in)	
3rd place, bronze medalist(s)			0.00 m (0 in)	
4			0.00 m (0 in)	
5			0.00 m (0 in)	
6			0.00 m (0 in)	
7			0.00 m (0 in)	
8			0.00 m (0 in)	
9			0.00 m (0 in)	
10			0.00 m (0 in)	
11			0.00 m (0 in)	
12			0.00 m (0 in)	
13			0.00 m (0 in)	
14			0.00 m (0 in)	
15			0.00 m (0 in)	
16			0.00 m (0 in)	

==== Shot put ====
- Final results shown, not prelims

Rank	Name	University	Best throw	Team score
1st place, gold medalist(s)			00.00 m (0 in)	
2nd place, silver medalist(s)			00.00 m (0 in)	
3rd place, bronze medalist(s)			00.00 m (0 in)	
4			00.00 m (0 in)	
5			00.00 m (0 in)	
6			00.00 m (0 in)	
7			00.00 m (0 in)	
8			00.00 m (0 in)	
9			00.00 m (0 in)	
10			00.00 m (0 in)	
11			00.00 m (0 in)	
12			00.00 m (0 in)	
13			00.00 m (0 in)	
14			00.00 m (0 in)	
15			00.00 m (0 in)	
16			00.00 m (0 in)	

==== Pentathlon ====
- Final results shown, not prelims

Rank	Name	University	Overall points	60 m H	HJ	SP	LJ	800 m
1st place, gold medalist(s)				000; 0.00	000; 0.00 m (0 in)	000; 0.00 m (0 in)	000; 0.00 m (0 in)	000; 0:00.00
2nd place, silver medalist(s)				000; 0.00	000; 0.00 m (0 in)	000; 0.00 m (0 in)	000; 0.00 m (0 in)	000; 0:00.00
3rd place, bronze medalist(s)				000; 0.00	000; 0.00 m (0 in)	000; 0.00 m (0 in)	000; 0.00 m (0 in)	000; 0:00.00
4				000; 0.00	000; 0.00 m (0 in)	000; 0.00 m (0 in)	000; 0.00 m (0 in)	000; 0:00.00
5				000; 0.00	000; 0.00 m (0 in)	000; 0.00 m (0 in)	000; 0.00 m (0 in)	000; 0:00.00
6				000; 0.00	000; 0.00 m (0 in)	000; 0.00 m (0 in)	000; 0.00 m (0 in)	000; 0:00.00
7				000; 0.00	000; 0.00 m (0 in)	000; 0.00 m (0 in)	000; 0.00 m (0 in)	000; 0:00.00
8				000; 0.00	000; 0.00 m (0 in)	000; 0.00 m (0 in)	000; 0.00 m (0 in)	000; 0:00.00
9				000; 0.00	000; 0.00 m (0 in)	000; 0.00 m (0 in)	000; 0.00 m (0 in)	000; 0:00.00
10				000; 0.00	000; 0.00 m (0 in)	000; 0.00 m (0 in)	000; 0.00 m (0 in)	000; 0:00.00
11				000; 0.00	000; 0.00 m (0 in)	000; 0.00 m (0 in)	000; 0.00 m (0 in)	000; 0:00.00
12				000; 0.00	000; 0.00 m (0 in)	000; 0.00 m (0 in)	000; 0.00 m (0 in)	000; 0:00.00
13				000; 0.00	000; 0.00 m (0 in)	000; 0.00 m (0 in)	000; 0.00 m (0 in)	000; 0:00.00
14				000; 0.00	000; 0.00 m (0 in)	000; 0.00 m (0 in)	000; 0.00 m (0 in)	000; 0:00.00
15				000; 0.00	000; 0.00 m (0 in)	000; 0.00 m (0 in)	000; 0.00 m (0 in)	000; 0:00.00
16				000; 0.00	000; 0.00 m (0 in)	000; 0.00 m (0 in)	000; 0.00 m (0 in)	000; 0:00.00

==== 3000 meters racewalk ====
- Final results shown, not prelims

Rank	Name	University	Time	Team score
1st place, gold medalist(s)				
2nd place, silver medalist(s)				
3rd place, bronze medalist(s)				
4				
5				
6				
7				
8				
9				
10				
11				
12				
13				
14				
15				
16				

=== Women's team scores ===
- Top 10 and ties shown

Rank	University	Team score
1st place, gold medalist(s)		00 points
2nd place, silver medalist(s)		00 points
3rd place, bronze medalist(s)		00 points
4		00 points
5		00 points
6		00 points
7		00 points
8		00 points
9		00 points
10		00 points

== See also ==
- National Association of Intercollegiate Athletics (NAIA)
- NCAA Men's Division I Indoor Track and Field Championships
- NCAA Women's Division I Indoor Track and Field Championships
