= 2023 NAIA indoor track and field championships =

College track and field competition

- Dates: March 2–4, 2023
- Host city: Brookings, South Dakota
- Venue: Sanford-Jackrabbit Athletic Complex
- Events: 42

The 2023 NAIA indoor track and field championships were the 58th NAIA men's indoor track and field championship and the 43rd NAIA women's indoor track and field championship, held at the Sanford-Jackrabbit Athletic Complex on the campus of South Dakota State University in Brookings, South Dakota. The event consisted of 21 different men's and women's indoor track and field events contested from March 2 to March 4, 2023.

== Results ==
=== Men's results ===
==== 60 meters ====
- Final results shown, not prelims

| Rank | Name | University | Time | Team score |
|---|---|---|---|---|
| 1st place, gold medalist(s) | Saminu Abdul-Rasheed | Florida Memorial | 6.63 | 10 |
| 2nd place, silver medalist(s) | Donte Sol | Multnomah | 6.65 | 8 |
| 3rd place, bronze medalist(s) | Jaylan Washington | Ottawa | 6.68 | 6 |
| 4 | Esau Haynes | Indiana Tech | 6.74 (6.735) | 5 |
| 5 | Jaylyn Session | Florida Memorial | 6.74 (6.740) | 4 |
| 6 | Malik Williams | Langston | 6.79 | 3 |
| 7 | Chase Mars | Vanguard | 6.80 | 2 |
| 8 | Melvin Johnson | Keiser | 6.83 | 1 |

==== 200 meters ====
- Final results shown, not prelims

| Rank | Name | University | Time | Team score |
|---|---|---|---|---|
| 1st place, gold medalist(s) | Deveyon Blacknell | Madonna | 21.07 | 10 |
| 2nd place, silver medalist(s) | Cortez Cunningham | Madonna | 21.10 | 8 |
| 3rd place, bronze medalist(s) | Donte Sol | Multnomah | 21.12 | 6 |
| 4 | Melvin Johnson | Keiser | 21.19 | 5 |
| 5 | Chase Mars | Vanguard | 21.26 | 4 |
| 6 | Saminu Abdul-Rasheed | Florida Memorial | 21.36 | 3 |
| 7 | James Williamson III | Southeastern U. | 21.42 | 2 |
| 8 | Cody Branch | Dillard | 21.43 | 1 |

==== 400 meters ====
- Final results shown, not prelims

| Rank | Name | University | Time | Team score |
|---|---|---|---|---|
| 1st place, gold medalist(s) | Joseph Taylor | Southeastern U. | 46.80 | 10 |
| 2nd place, silver medalist(s) | Cortez Cunningham | Madonna | 47.00 | 8 |
| 3rd place, bronze medalist(s) | Vindero Lightfoot | Keiser | 47.54 | 6 |
| 4 | Cody Branch | Dillard | 47.77 | 5 |
| 5 | Nathan Iacona | Aquinas | 47.82 | 4 |
| 6 | Keishon Franklin | Southeastern U. | 48.10 | 3 |
| 7 | Venord Burrows | Life | 48.36 | 2 |
| 8 | James Farmer-Cole | MidAmerica Nazarene | 2:01.41 | 1 |

==== 600 meters ====
- Final results shown, not prelims

| Rank | Name | University | Time | Team score |
|---|---|---|---|---|
| 1st place, gold medalist(s) | Jacob Ulrich | Life | 1:16.34 | 10 |
| 2nd place, silver medalist(s) | Dylan Felger | Huntington | 1:17.69 | 8 |
| 3rd place, bronze medalist(s) | Payton Mauldin | Dordt | 1:18.55 | 6 |
| 4 | Carter Gordon | Lewis-Clark | 1:19.05 | 5 |
| 5 | Maksims Sincukovs | Marian (Ind.) | 1:19.85 | 4 |
| 6 | Cole Zevenbergen | Dordt | 1:20.29 | 3 |
| 7 | Marcus Brown | Waldorf | 1:20.88 | 2 |
| 8 | Joel Forbes | Cumberland (Tenn.) | 1:22.51 | 1 |

==== 800 meters ====
- Final results shown, not prelims

| Rank | Name | University | Time | Team score |
|---|---|---|---|---|
| 1st place, gold medalist(s) | Milan Todorovic | Oklahoma City | 1:52.03 | 10 |
| 2nd place, silver medalist(s) | Charlie Young | Indiana Wesleyan | 1:52.55 | 8 |
| 3rd place, bronze medalist(s) | Tommee Smith | Spring Arbor | 1:52.84 | 6 |
| 4 | Drew Thornton | Marian (Ind.) | 1:53.32 | 5 |
| 5 | Carter Huyser | Grand View | 1:53.49 | 4 |
| 6 | Max Grant | Olivet Nazarene | 1:54.28 | 3 |
| 7 | Nate Conkel | Taylor | 2:14.05 | 2 |

==== 1000 meters ====
- Final results shown, not prelims

| Rank | Name | University | Time | Team score |
|---|---|---|---|---|
| 1st place, gold medalist(s) | Senzo Sokhela | Westmont | 2:25.42 | 10 |
| 2nd place, silver medalist(s) | Liam Neidig | St. Mary (Kan.) | 2:25.70 | 8 |
| 3rd place, bronze medalist(s) | Jack Vanden Heuvel | Westmont | 2:26.10 | 6 |
| 4 | Spencer Carpenter | St. Francis (Ind.) | 2:26.27 | 5 |
| 5 | David Mannella | Benedictine (Kan.) | 2:26.36 | 4 |
| 6 | Dillon Callaway | Tabor | 2:27.25 | 3 |
| 7 | Hunter Nichols | Eastern Oregon | 2:28.61 | 2 |
| 8 | Isaiah Wittrock | Grand View | 2:31.55 | 1 |

==== Mile ====
- Final results shown, not prelims

| Rank | Name | University | Time | Team score |
|---|---|---|---|---|
| 1st place, gold medalist(s) | Jason Bowers | Cumberland (Tenn.) | 4:03.72 | 10 |
| 2nd place, silver medalist(s) | Senzo Sokhela | Westmont | 4:08.53 | 8 |
| 3rd place, bronze medalist(s) | Davis Boggess | The Master's | 4:08.62 | 6 |
| 4 | Will Stockley | Milligan | 4:08.85 | 5 |
| 5 | Dean Reynolds | Spring Arbor | 4:09.06 | 4 |
| 6 | Walid Jarfani | Texas Wesleyan | 4:09.13 | 3 |
| 7 | Braden Sweet | Indiana Wesleyan | 4:09.84 | 2 |
| 8 | Isaac Sytsma | Indiana Tech | 4:11.23 | 1 |
| 9 | Trey Engen | Dordt | 4:16.88 | -- |
| 10 | Lance Wells | Life | 4:21.24 | -- |

==== 3000 meters ====
- Final results shown, not prelims

| Rank | Name | University | Time | Team score |
|---|---|---|---|---|
| 1st place, gold medalist(s) | Bryn Woodall | Milligan | 8:19.09 | 10 |
| 2nd place, silver medalist(s) | Joe Anderson | Dordt | 8:21.35 | 8 |
| 3rd place, bronze medalist(s) | Eli Fullerton | Indiana Wesleyan | 8:22.32 | 6 |
| 4 | Jackson Wilson | Rocky Mountain | 8:24.78 | 5 |
| 5 | Aiden Kammler | Shawnee State | 8:24.81 | 4 |
| 6 | Nelson Kemboi | Goshen | 8:26.43 | 3 |
| 7 | Logan Horning | Friends | 8:26.85 | 2 |
| 8 | Nolan Rudd | St. Ambrose | 8:30.34 | 1 |
| 9 | Edwin Kipainoi | Montana Tech | 8:32.56 | -- |
| 10 | Brendan Erwin | St. Mary (Kan.) | 8:37.38 | -- |
| 11 | Milos Pendic | Trinity Christian | 8:38.05 | -- |
| 12 | Brock Lauer | McPherson | 8:42.14 | -- |

==== 5000 meters ====
- Final results shown, not prelims

| Rank | Name | University | Time | Team score |
|---|---|---|---|---|
| 1st place, gold medalist(s) | Aaron Jones | Milligan | 14:26.68 | 10 |
| 2nd place, silver medalist(s) | Peter Shippy | Dordt | 14:28.61 | 8 |
| 3rd place, bronze medalist(s) | Luke Pohl | Cornerstone | 14:34.83 | 6 |
| 4 | Landon Wakeman | Indiana Wesleyan | 14:41.67 | 5 |
| 5 | Donovan Denslow | Missouri Baptist | 14:42.75 | 4 |
| 6 | Micah Murphy | Northwest U. | 14:46.31 | 3 |
| 7 | Davis Tebben | Dordt | 14:49.18 | 2 |
| 8 | Hunter Romine | The Master's | 14:50.89 | 1 |
| 9 | Aidan Vorster | Dordt | 14:53.18 | -- |
| 10 | Tyler Jenkins | Rio Grande | 14:53.78 | -- |
| 11 | Brint Laubach | The Master's | 15:03.38 | -- |
| 12 | Luke Harber | Taylor | 15:17.41 | -- |

==== 60 meter hurdles ====
- Final results shown, not prelims

| Rank | Name | University | Time | Team score |
|---|---|---|---|---|
| 1st place, gold medalist(s) | Emmanuel Niang | Talladega | 7.85 | 10 |
| 2nd place, silver medalist(s) | Zach Turner | Doane | 7.90 | 8 |
| 3rd place, bronze medalist(s) | Davonte Vanterpool | Southeastern U. | 7.91 | 6 |
| 4 | Darion Carter | Southeastern U. | 7.95 | 5 |
| 5 | Javon Sanders | Indiana Tech | 7.97 | 4 |
| 6 | Ahumad Williams | Indiana Tech | 7.99 | 3 |
| 7 | Erich Rhodeback | Mount Vernon Naz | 8.05 | 2 |
| 8 | Glenn Rodgers | Southeastern U. | 8.10 | 1 |

==== 4 x 400 meters relay ====
- Final results shown, not prelims

| Rank | University | Time | Team score |
|---|---|---|---|
| 1st place, gold medalist(s) | Southeastern U. | 3:10.40 | 10 |
| 2nd place, silver medalist(s) | Mount Vernon Nazarene | 3:14.08 | 8 |
| 3rd place, bronze medalist(s) | Life | 3:15.38 | 6 |
| 4 | Dordt | 3:16.06 | 5 |
| 5 | Marian (Ind.) | 3:16.21 | 4 |
| 6 | Indiana Tech | 3:16.30 | 3 |
| 7 | Keiser | 3:16.46 | 2 |
| 8 | Doane | 3:16.61 | 1 |

==== 4 x 800 meters relay ====
- Final results shown, not prelims

| Rank | University | Time | Team score |
|---|---|---|---|
| 1st place, gold medalist(s) | Grace | 7:33.70 | 10 |
| 2nd place, silver medalist(s) | Indiana Wesleyan | 7:35.43 | 8 |
| 3rd place, bronze medalist(s) | Dordt | 7:35.57 | 6 |
| 4 | Marian (Ind.) | 7:36.44 | 5 |
| 5 | Oklahoma City | 7:38.11 | 4 |
| 6 | Aquinas | 7:44.70 | 3 |
| 7 | Spring Arbor | 7:47.35 | 2 |
| 8 | Westmont | 7:47.92 | 1 |

==== Distance medley relay ====
- Final results shown, not prelims

| Rank | University | Time | Team score |
|---|---|---|---|
| 1st place, gold medalist(s) | The Master's | 9:59.47 | 10 |
| 2nd place, silver medalist(s) | Grace | 9:59.70 | 8 |
| 3rd place, bronze medalist(s) | St. Mary (Kan.) | 10:04.77 | 6 |
| 4 | Indiana Wesleyan | 10:05.74 | 5 |
| 5 | Benedictine (Kan.) | 10:09.85 | 4 |
| 6 | Milligan | 10:10.71 | 3 |
| 7 | Life | 10:16.64 | 2 |
| 8 | Grand View | 10:26.95 | 1 |

==== High jump ====
- Final results shown, not prelims

| Rank | Name | University | Best jump | Team score |
|---|---|---|---|---|
| 1st place, gold medalist(s) | Michael Millslagle | Graceland | 2.13 m (6 ft 11 3/4 in) | 10 |
| 2nd place, silver medalist(s) | Vance Shewey | Tabor | 2.10 m (6 ft 10 1/2 in) | 8 |
| 3rd place, bronze medalist(s) | Shandon Reitzell | Midland | 2.10 m (6 ft 10 1/2 in) | 6 |
| 4 | KeRon Blackwell | Iowa Wesleyan | 2.07 m (6 ft 9 1/4 in) | 5 |
| 5 | Jamarrion Reed | Texas Wesleyan | 2.04 m (6 ft 8 1/4 in) | 4 |
| 6 | Noam Pritchett | Keiser | 2.04 m (6 ft 8 1/4 in) | 3 |
| 7 | Tony Kinser | St. Mary (Kan.) | 2.01 m (6 ft 7 in) | 0.60 |
| 7 | Shane Glasco | Bethel (Ind.) | 2.01 m (6 ft 7 in) | 0.60 |
| 7 | Andre Daniels | Rochester (MI) | 2.01 m (6 ft 7 in) | 0.60 |
| 7 | Damien Trahan | Xavier-Louisiana | 2.01 m (6 ft 7 in) | 0.60 |
| 7 | Grant Brouwer | Dordt | 2.01 m (6 ft 7 in) | 0.60 |
| 12 | Jaiden Peraza | Valley City State | 2.01 m (6 ft 7 in) | -- |
| 13 | Jerome Luckey | Keiser | 2.01 m (6 ft 7 in) | -- |
| 14 | Victor Dailey | Multnomah | 1.96 m (6 ft 5 in) | -- |
| 14 | Tyler Jones | Eastern Oregon | 1.96 m (6 ft 5 in) | -- |
| 16 | Ross McMahon | Midland | 1.96 m (6 ft 5 in) | -- |
| 16 | Ethan Hammett | Brewton-Parker | 1.96 m (6 ft 5 in) | -- |
| 16 | Cole Wilson | Keiser | 1.96 m (6 ft 5 in) | -- |
| 16 | Carter Reckling | Doane | 1.96 m (6 ft 5 in) | -- |

==== Pole vault ====
- Final results shown, not prelims

| Rank | Name | University | Best jump | Team score |
|---|---|---|---|---|
| 1st place, gold medalist(s) | Caleb Pouliot | The Master's | 5.10 m (16 ft 8 3/4 in) | 10 |
| 2nd place, silver medalist(s) | Zach Zohner | Concordia (Neb.) | 5.05 m (16 ft 6 3/4 in) | 8 |
| 3rd place, bronze medalist(s) | Isaac Brown | Taylor | 5.00 m (16 ft 4 3/4 in) | 6 |
| 4 | Emil Carlsson | Keiser | 4.95 m (16 ft 2 3/4 in) | 5 |
| 5 | Tristan Petrey | Cumberlands | 4.90 m (16 ft 3/4 in) | 4 |
| 6 | Treyson Welch | Indiana Wesleyan | 4.90 m (16 ft 3/4 in) | 3 |
| 7 | Zach Bennetts | Concordia (Neb.) | 4.90 m (16 ft 3/4 in) | 2 |
| 8 | Tom Paris | Keiser | 4.85 m (15 ft 10 3/4 in) | 1 |
| 9 | Chase Berry | Concordia (Neb.) | 4.85 m (15 ft 10 3/4 in) | -- |
| 10 | Joe Painter | St. Francis (Ind.) | 4.80 m (15 ft 8 3/4 in) | -- |
| 11 | Maximiliano Kittsteiner | Southeastern U. | 4.80 m (15 ft 8 3/4 in) | -- |
| 12 | Damon Knowles | Taylor | 4.75 m (15 ft 7 in) | -- |
| 13 | Mike Pulliam | Doane | 4.75 m (15 ft 7 in) | -- |
| 14 | Noah Sears | Olivet Nazarene | 4.65 m (15 ft 3 in) | -- |
| 14 | Julien David | Keiser | 4.65 m (15 ft 3 in) | -- |
| 16 | Noah Schultz | Indiana Tech | 4.65 m (15 ft 3 in) | -- |

==== Long jump ====
- Final results shown, not prelims

| Rank | Name | University | Best jump | Team score |
|---|---|---|---|---|
| 1st place, gold medalist(s) | William Jones | Life | 7.51 m (24 ft 7 1/2 in) | 10 |
| 2nd place, silver medalist(s) | Goodness Iredia | Cumberland (Tenn.) | 7.40 m (24 ft 3 1/4 in) | 8 |
| 3rd place, bronze medalist(s) | Dustin Blevins | Montreat | 7.36 m (24 ft 1 3/4 in) | 6 |
| 4 | Trey Palmer | Bethel (Kan.) | 7.33 m (24 ft 1/2 in) | 5 |
| 5 | Braden Kalvelage | Northwestern (Iowa) | 7.32 m (24 ft 0 in) | 4 |
| 6 | Sammy Sommers | Taylor | 7.27 m (23 ft 10 in) | 3 |
| 7 | Paul Marchand | Graceland | 7.20 m (23 ft 7 1/4 in) | 2 |
| 8 | Jaylen Coleman | Florida Memorial | 7.14 m (23 ft 5 in) | 1 |
| 9 | Matthew Gipple | Siena Heights | 7.12 m (23 ft 4 1/4 in) | -- |
| 10 | Armani Glass | Marian (Ind.) | 7.09 m (23 ft 3 in) | -- |
| 11 | Mark Morozov | Life | 7.06 m (23 ft 1 3/4 in) | -- |
| 12 | Jake Thompson | Taylor | 7.02 m (23 ft 1/4 in) | -- |
| 13 | Kilan Macklin | Campbellsville | 7.01 m (22 ft 11 3/4 in) | -- |
| 14 | Tim Ballah | MidAmerica Nazarene | 7.00 m (22 ft 11 1/2 in) | -- |
| 15 | Daimer Stephens-Stewart | Point Park | 6.99 m (22 ft 11 in) | -- |
| 16 | Hugo Biget | Keiser | 6.97 m (22 ft 10 1/4 in) | -- |

==== Triple jump ====
- Final results shown, not prelims

| Rank | Name | University | Best jump | Team score |
|---|---|---|---|---|
| 1st place, gold medalist(s) | William Jones | Life | 15.89 m (52 ft 1 1/2 in) | 10 |
| 2nd place, silver medalist(s) | Jaylen Coleman | Florida Memorial | 15.42 m (50 ft 7 in) | 8 |
| 3rd place, bronze medalist(s) | Seth Alexander | Xavier-Louisiana | 14.87 m (48 ft 9 1/4 in) | 6 |
| 4 | Matthew Mays | Campbellsville | 14.83 m (48 ft 7 3/4 in) | 5 |
| 5 | Corey Smith II | Campbellsville | 14.82 m (48 ft 7 1/4 in) | 4 |
| 6 | Blake Harris | Xavier-Louisiana | 14.82 m (48 ft 7 1/4 in) | 3 |
| 7 | Myles Lincoln | Union (Ky.) | 14.80 m (48 ft 6 1/2 in) | 2 |
| 8 | Goodness Iredia | Cumberland (Tenn.) | 14.80 m (48 ft 6 1/2 in) | 1 |
| 9 | Michael Tatnall | Voorhees | 14.72 m (48 ft 3 1/2 in) | -- |
| 10 | Ledamian Rowell | William Carey | 14.72 m (48 ft 3 1/2 in) | -- |
| 11 | Jaylen Poole | Cumberland (Tenn.) | 14.68 m (48 ft 1 3/4 in) | -- |
| 12 | Kendall Caffey | Langston | 14.63 m (47 ft 11 3/4 in) | -- |
| 13 | Collins Eze | Point Park | 14.57 m (47 ft 9 1/2 in) | -- |
| 14 | Tevon Shuler | Tennessee Wesleyan | 14.49 m (47 ft 6 1/4 in) | -- |
| 15 | Lorenzo Luces | Wayland Baptist | 14.46 m (47 ft 5 1/4 in) | -- |
| 16 | Enoch Aboussou | Missouri Valley | 14.41 m (47 ft 3 1/4 in) | -- |

==== Shot put ====
- Final results shown, not prelims

| Rank | Name | University | Best throw | Team score |
|---|---|---|---|---|
| 1st place, gold medalist(s) | Dylan Kucera | Midland | 19.17 m (62 ft 10 1/2 in) | 10 |
| 2nd place, silver medalist(s) | Kyle Manuel | Southeastern U. | 17.38 m (57 ft 1/4 in) | 8 |
| 3rd place, bronze medalist(s) | Galen Brantley III | Dickinson St. | 16.70 m (54 ft 9 1/4 in) | 6 |
| 4 | Jacob Netral | Marian (Ind.) | 16.69 m (54 ft 9 in) | 5 |
| 5 | Tanner Nett | Eastern Oregon | 16.48 m (54 ft 3/4 in) | 4 |
| 6 | Christian Rios | Marian (Ind.) | 16.39 m (53 ft 9 1/4 in) | 3 |
| 7 | Alex Herman | Midland | 16.38 m (53 ft 8 3/4 in) | 2 |
| 8 | Kyler Dickey | Mount Vernon Naz | 16.30 m (53 ft 5 1/2 in) | 1 |
| 9 | Cole Parker | Kansas Wesleyan | 16.29 m (53 ft 5 1/4 in) | -- |
| 10 | Jonah Wilson | St. Ambrose | 16.01 m (52 ft 6 1/4 in) | -- |
| 11 | Mykolas Saloninas | St. Ambrose | 15.77 m (51 ft 8 3/4 in) | -- |
| 12 | Deandre Leith | Columbia Int'l | 15.62 m (51 ft 2 3/4 in) | -- |
| 13 | Conner Tordsen | Dakota State | 15.39 m (50 ft 5 3/4 in) | -- |
| 14 | Alec Seifert | St. Ambrose | 15.25 m (50 ft 1/4 in) | -- |
| 15 | Garrett Kocab | Carroll (Mont.) | 15.20 m (49 ft 10 1/4 in) | -- |
| 16 | Ayobami Aroyko | St. Xavier | 15.17 m (49 ft 9 in) | -- |

==== Weight throw ====
- Final results shown, not prelims

| Rank | Name | University | Best throw | Team score |
|---|---|---|---|---|
| 1st place, gold medalist(s) | Matthew Campbell | Doane | 20.65 m (67 ft 8 3/4 in) | 10 |
| 2nd place, silver medalist(s) | Dylan Kucera | Midland | 20.35 m (66 ft 9 in) | 8 |
| 3rd place, bronze medalist(s) | Trey Dickey | Doane | 19.61 m (64 ft 4 in) | 6 |
| 4 | Luke Partridge | Doane | 19.05 m (62 ft 6 in) | 5 |
| 5 | Isaiah Tipping | Marian (Ind.) | 18.79 m (61 ft 7 3/4 in) | 4 |
| 6 | Conner Tordsen | Dakota State | 18.66 m (61 ft 2 1/2 in) | 3 |
| 7 | Alex Hunt | Madonna | 18.59 m (60 ft 11 3/4 in) | 2 |
| 8 | Noah thomas | Pikeville | 18.36 m (60 ft 2 3/4 in) | 1 |
| 9 | Wade Baker | Waldorf | 17.99 m (59 ft 1/4 in) | -- |
| 10 | Jaedon Lothrop | Doane | 17.90 m (58 ft 8 1/2 in) | -- |
| 11 | Chris Wren | Concordia (Neb.) | 17.63 m (57 ft 10 in) | -- |
| 12 | Nick Huynh | Cornerstone | 17.43 m (57 ft 2 in) | -- |
| 13 | Dawson Sedivec | Jamestown | 17.30 m (56 ft 9 in) | -- |
| 14 | Jacob Joachim | Dakota State | 17.15 m (56 ft 3 in) | -- |
| 15 | Liam Hesting | Taylor | 17.08 m (56 ft 1/4 in) | -- |
| 16 | Mitchell Miller | Mount Mercy | 17.07 m (56 ft 0 in) | -- |

==== Heptathlon ====
- Final results shown, not prelims

| Rank | Name | University | Overall points | 60 m | LJ | SP | HJ | 60 m H | PV | 1000 m |
|---|---|---|---|---|---|---|---|---|---|---|
| 1st place, gold medalist(s) | Cole Wilson | Keiser | 5347 | 823; 7.17 | 767; 6.80 m (22 ft 3 1/2 in) | 656; 12.82 m (42 ft 1/2 in) | 803; 2.00 m (6 ft 6 1/2 in) | 825; 8.65 | 716; 4.35 m (14 ft 3 1/4 in) | 757; 2:50.84 |
| 2nd place, silver medalist(s) | Treshawn Roberts | Dakota State | 5174 | 802; 7.23 | 704; 6.53 m (21 ft 5 in) | 668; 13.02 m (42 ft 8 1/2 in) | 723; 1.91 m (6 ft 3 in) | 884; 8.40 | 746; 4.45 m (14 ft 7 in) | 647; 3:01.79 |
| 3rd place, bronze medalist(s) | Mason Schleis | Mount Marty | 5104 | 837; 7.13 | 771; 6.82 m (22 ft 4 1/2 in) | 489; 10.05 m (32 ft 11 1/2 in) | 696; 1.88 m (6 ft 2 in) | 869; 8.46 | 659; 4.15 m (13 ft 7 1/4 in) | 783; 2:48.37 |
| 4 | Seth Wiebelhaus | Mount Marty | 4949 | 752; 7.38 | 635; 6.22 m (20 ft 4 3/4 in) | 563; 11.29 m (37 ft 1/4 in) | 644; 1.82 m (5 ft 11 1/2 in) | 908; 8.30 | 659; 4.15 m (13 ft 7 1/4 in) | 788; 2:47.90 |
| 5 | Justin Moeller | William Penn | 4862 | 765; 7.34 | 750; 6.73 m (22 ft 3/4 in) | 496; 10.17 m (33 ft 4 1/4 in) | 749; 1.94 m (6 ft 4 1/4 in) | 806; 8.73 | 549; 3.75 m (12 ft 3 1/2 in) | 747; 2:51.77 |
| 6 | Nigel Steenwinkel | Keiser | 4852 | 858; 7.07 | 567; 5.91 m (19 ft 4 1/2 in) | 558; 11.20 m (36 ft 8 3/4 in) | 544; 1.70 m (5 ft 6 3/4 in) | 843; 8.57 | 716; 4.35 m (14 ft 3 1/4 in) | 766; 2:49.95 |
| 7 | Chantz Minear | Grand View | 4834 | 775; 7.31 | 650; 6.29 m (20 ft 7 1/2 in) | 462; 9.60 m (31 ft 5 3/4 in) | 723; 1.91 m (6 ft 3 in) | 937; 8.18 | 549; 3.75 m (12 ft 3 1/2 in) | 738; 2:52.63 |
| 8 | Elisha Fleming | Bethel (Ind.) | 4831 | 745; 7.40 | 679; 6.42 m (21 ft 3/4 in) | 554; 11.14 m (36 ft 6 1/2 in) | 776; 1.97 m (6 ft 5 1/2 in) | 775; 8.87 | 603; 3.95 m (12 ft 11 1/2 in) | 699; 2:56.48 |
| 9 | Jaden Haldeman | Mount Vernon Naz | 4735 | 889; 6.98 | 641; 6.25 m (20 ft 6 in) | 545; 10.99 m (36 ft 1/2 in) | 593; 1.76 m (5 ft 9 1/4 in) | 867; 8.47 | 418; 3.25 m (10 ft 7 3/4 in) | 782; 2:48.44 |
| 10 | Jarod Belden | York (Neb.) | 4709 | 716; 7.49 | 617; 6.14 m (20 ft 1 1/2 in) | 542; 10.94 m (35 ft 10 1/2 in) | 619; 1.79 m (5 ft 10 1/4 in) | 820; 8.67 | 603; 3.95 m (12 ft 11 1/2 in) | 792; 2:47.47 |
| 11 | James Vandun | Clarke | 4703 | 769; 7.33 | 668; 6.37 m (20 ft 10 3/4 in) | 473; 9.79 m (32 ft 1 1/4 in) | 644; 1.82 m (5 ft 11 1/2 in) | 809; 8.72 | 659; 4.15 m (13 ft 7 1/4 in) | 681; 2:58.33 |
| 12 | Israel Miles | Eastern Oregon | 4691 | 752; 7.38 | 582; 5.98 m (19 ft 7 1/4 in) | 542; 10.93 m (35 ft 10 1/4 in) | 569; 1.73 m (5 ft 8 in) | 839; 8.59 | 659; 4.15 m (13 ft 7 1/4 in) | 748; 2:51.73 |
| 13 | Christian Bothwell | Lewis-Clark | 4689 | 700; 7.54 | 617; 6.14 m (20 ft 1 1/2 in) | 564; 11.30 m (37 ft 3/4 in) | 619; 1.79 m (5 ft 10 1/4 in) | 737; 9.04 | 688; 4.25 m (13 ft 11 1/4 in) | 764; 2:50.16 |
| 14 | Camden Woolbright | Missouri Baptist | 4573 | 785; 7.28 | 597; 6.05 m (19 ft 10 in) | 467; 9.69 m (31 ft 9 1/4 in) | 619; 1.79 m (5 ft 10 1/4 in) | 797; 8.77 | 631; 4.05 m (13 ft 3 1/4 in) | 677; 2:58.72 |
| 15 | Montrell Blacknall | SAGU | 4565 | 796; 7.25 | 606; 6.09 m (19 ft 11 3/4 in) | 400; 8.56 m (28 ft 1 in) | 670; 1.85 m (6 ft 3/4 in) | 802; 8.75 | 688; 4.25 m (13 ft 11 1/4 in) | 603; 3:06.35 |
| 16 | Ethan Smith | Central Methodist | 4555 | 759; 7.36 | 565; 5.90 m (19 ft 4 1/4 in) | 575; 11.49 m (37 ft 8 1/4 in) | 569; 1.73 m (5 ft 8 in) | 726; 9.09 | 659; 4.15 m (13 ft 7 1/4 in) | 702; 2:56.21 |

==== 3000 meters racewalk ====
- Final results shown, not prelims

| Rank | Name | University | Time | Team score |
|---|---|---|---|---|
| 1st place, gold medalist(s) | Jordan Crawford | Missouri Baptist | 12:54.85 | 10 |
| 2nd place, silver medalist(s) | Carson Johnson | Cumberlands | 13:15.20 | 8 |
| 3rd place, bronze medalist(s) | Pablo Sanz-Rillo | Friends | 13:22.87 | 6 |
| 4 | Gage Carr | Friends | 13:52.82 | 5 |
| 5 | Jadon Davis | Friends | 14:17.93 | 4 |
| 6 | Nathan Limas | Grand View | 14:22.38 | 3 |
| 7 | Cole Bennett | Grand View | 14:31.04 | 2 |
| 8 | Seth Diser | Grand View | 14:45.15 | 1 |
| 9 | Noah Church | Clarke | 15:06.38 | -- |
| 10 | Ben Vasquez | Clarke | 15:08.18 | -- |
| 11 | TJ Sanders | Southeastern U. | 15:27.73 | -- |
| 12 | Kenny Tucker | Iowa Wesleyan | 16:09.94 | -- |
| 13 | Wyatt Wilson | Montreat | 16:17.94 | -- |
| 14 | Jace Cowman | Lindsey Wilson | 18:53.69 | -- |
| - | Cameron Nocton | Indiana East | DQ | -- |
| - | Logan Lucas | Iowa Wesleyan | DQ | -- |

=== Men's team scores ===
- Top 10 and ties shown

| Rank | University | Team score |
|---|---|---|
| 1st place, gold medalist(s) | Southeastern U | 45 points |
| 2nd place, silver medalist(s) | Life | 40 points |
| 3rd place, bronze medalist(s) | Dordt | 38.6 points |
| 4 | Indiana Wesleyan | 37 points |
| 5 | Keiser | 36 points |
| 6 | Doane | 30 points |
| 6 | Marian (Ind.) | 30 points |
| 8 | Madonna | 28 points |
| 8 | Milligan | 28 points |
| 10 | The Master's | 27 points |

=== Women's results ===
==== 60 meters ====
- Final results shown, not prelims

| Rank | Name | University | Time | Team score |
|---|---|---|---|---|
| 1st place, gold medalist(s) | Talayla Davis | Life | 7.28 | 10 |
| 2nd place, silver medalist(s) | Praise Idamadudu | Cumberland (Tenn.) | 7.43 | 8 |
| 3rd place, bronze medalist(s) | Latavia Jack | Mobile | 7.46 | 6 |
| 4 | Soyinne Grenyion | Indiana Tech | 7.47 | 5 |
| 5 | Nicole Johnson | Warner | 7.50 | 4 |
| 6 | Sabrina Richman | Life | 7.51 | 3 |
| 7 | Fredricka McKenzie | William Carey | 7.52 | 2 |
| 8 | Salieci Myles | William Carey | 7.56 | 1 |

==== 200 meters ====
- Final results shown, not prelims

| Rank | Name | University | Time | Team score |
|---|---|---|---|---|
| 1st place, gold medalist(s) | Talayla Davis | Life | 23.67 | 10 |
| 2nd place, silver medalist(s) | Praise Idamadudu | Cumberland (Tenn.) | 23.96 | 8 |
| 3rd place, bronze medalist(s) | Joy Abu | William Carey | 24.28 | 6 |
| 4 | Sabrina Richman | Life | 24.43 | 5 |
| 5 | Kevell Byrd | Dillard | 24.54 | 4 |
| 6 | Alyssa Busker | Trinity Christian | 24.62 | 3 |
| 7 | Maya Smith-Speed | Life | 24.63 | 2 |
| 8 | Soyinne Grenyion | Indiana Tech | 41.41 | 1 |

==== 400 meters ====
- Final results shown, not prelims

| Rank | Name | University | Time | Team score |
|---|---|---|---|---|
| 1st place, gold medalist(s) | Brianna Florvilus | Life | 54.16 | 10 |
| 2nd place, silver medalist(s) | Kevell Byrd | Dillard | 54.62 | 8 |
| 3rd place, bronze medalist(s) | Abu Joy | William Carey | 54.95 | 6 |
| 4 | Hannah Antkoviak | Olivet Nazarene | 55.11 | 5 |
| 5 | Reyn Burke | Vanguard | 55.24 | 4 |
| 6 | Charity Jones | Madonna | 55.66 | 3 |
| 7 | Kiara Carter | Olivet Nazarene | 56.23 | 2 |
| 8 | Namiah Simpson | Southeastern U. | 57.09 | 1 |

==== 600 meters ====
- Final results shown, not prelims

| Rank | Name | University | Time | Team score |
|---|---|---|---|---|
| 1st place, gold medalist(s) | Addy Wiley | Huntington | 1:29.47 | 10 |
| 2nd place, silver medalist(s) | Darly Camilo-Montenegro | Central Methodist | 1:32.58 | 8 |
| 3rd place, bronze medalist(s) | Jo'Deci Irby | Indiana Tech | 1:32.83 | 6 |
| 4 | Lauryn Mitchell | Eastern Oregon | 1:34.38 | 5 |
| 5 | Alison Ambuul | Benedictine (Kan.) | 1:34.97 | 4 |
| 6 | Mika Kooistra | Dordt | 1:35.35 | 3 |
| 7 | Olaide Olapade | Indiana Tech | 1:36.12 | 2 |
| 8 | Ellen Palmgren | The Master's | 1:38.42 | 1 |

==== 800 meters ====
- Final results shown, not prelims

| Rank | Name | University | Time | Team score |
|---|---|---|---|---|
| 1st place, gold medalist(s) | Addy Wiley | Huntington | 2:10.93 | 10 |
| 2nd place, silver medalist(s) | Maggie Whitney | Aquinas | 2:11.34 | |
| 3rd place, bronze medalist(s) | Caroline Cobo | Benedictine (Kan.) | 2:11.88 | 6 |
| 4 | Jena Hahlbeck | Park U. | 2:12.82 | 5 |
| 5 | Annika Pingel | Doane | 2:13.36 | 4 |
| 6 | Geraldin Correa | Lewis-Clark | 2:13.37 | 3 |
| 7 | Veronica Pinkerton | Hastings | 2:15.34 | 2 |
| 8 | Cailen Jolley | Oklahoma City | 2:21.06 | 1 |

==== 1000 meters ====
- Final results shown, not prelims

| Rank | Name | University | Time | Team score |
|---|---|---|---|---|
| 1st place, gold medalist(s) | Lisa Voyles | Indiana Tech | 2:50.52 | 10 |
| 2nd place, silver medalist(s) | Kylahn Freiberg | Concordia (Neb.) | 2:54.87 | 8 |
| 3rd place, bronze medalist(s) | Hannah Fredericks | The Master's | 2:55.17 | 6 |
| 4 | Abbey Shirts | College of Idaho | 2:55.39 | 5 |
| 5 | Danielle Allison | Tabor | 2:55.95 | 4 |
| 6 | Rylee Haecker | Concordia (Neb.) | 2:56.66 | 3 |
| 7 | Krista Boese | Indiana Tech | 3:02.04 | 2 |
| 8 | Dylan Garcia | Montreat | 3:06.76 | 1 |

==== Mile ====
- Final results shown, not prelims

| Rank | Name | University | Time | Team score |
|---|---|---|---|---|
| 1st place, gold medalist(s) | Addy Wiley | Huntington | 4:48.04 | 10 |
| 2nd place, silver medalist(s) | Sydney Little Light | Rocky Mountain | 4:49.66 | 8 |
| 3rd place, bronze medalist(s) | Lisa Voyles | Indiana Tech | 4:50.24 | 6 |
| 4 | Ellen-Mary Kearney | Milligan | 4:52.46 | 5 |
| 5 | Sage Martin | College of Idaho | 4:55.11 | 4 |
| 6 | Noel Vanderwall | Taylor | 4:57.77 | 3 |
| 7 | Heather Plastow | Grace | 5:00.60 | 2 |
| 8 | Maddy Walter-Sherretts | St. Mary (Kan.) | 5:01.56 | 1 |
| 9 | Summer Cooper | Goshen | 5:04.06 | -- |
| 10 | Allison Ramsey | St. Francis (Ill.) | 5:04.93 | -- |

==== 3000 meters ====
- Final results shown, not prelims

| Rank | Name | University | Time | Team score |
|---|---|---|---|---|
| 1st place, gold medalist(s) | Addy Wiley | Huntington | 9:47.57 | 10 |
| 2nd place, silver medalist(s) | Anna Martin | Cornerstone | 9:50.39 | 8 |
| 3rd place, bronze medalist(s) | Caitlin Dominy | Milligan | 9:51.15 | 6 |
| 4 | Alyssa Campbell | Point Park | 9:51.50 | 5 |
| 5 | Noel Vanderwall | Taylor | 9:52.35 | 4 |
| 6 | Addi Dewey | Indiana Wesleyan | 9:53.01 | 3 |
| 7 | Alyssa Armendariz | St. Mary (Kan.) | 9:53.39 | 2 |
| 8 | Elizabeth Barrett | Indiana Wesleyan | 9:56.26 | 1 |
| 9 | Ellyse Tingelstad | College of Idaho | 9:58.02 | -- |
| 10 | Alex Ebetino | St. Francis (Ind.) | 1-:07.49 | -- |
| 11 | Jozi Brown | Shawnee State | 10:07.80 | -- |
| 12 | Reagan Hiebert | St. Mary (Kan.) | 10:14.99 | -- |

==== 5000 meters ====
- Final results shown, not prelims

| Rank | Name | University | Time | Team score |
|---|---|---|---|---|
| 1st place, gold medalist(s) | Alyssa Bearzi | Milligan | 17:11.36 | 10 |
| 2nd place, silver medalist(s) | Hannah Adler | Aquinas | 17:18.54 | 8 |
| 3rd place, bronze medalist(s) | Lina May | William Carey | 17:28.20 | 6 |
| 4 | Katherine Bakken | St. Francis (Ill.) | 17:29.73 | 5 |
| 5 | Alyssa Armendariz | St. Mary (Kan.) | 17:33.80 | 4 |
| 6 | Kate Madsen | St. Mary (Kan.) | 17:44.02 | 3 |
| 7 | Mollie Gamble | Taylor | 17:45.06 | 2 |
| 8 | Julia Rohm | Southeastern U. | 17:57.21 | 1 |
| 9 | Ahna Vanderwall | Taylor | 18:02.80 | -- |
| 10 | Morgan Lawson | Grand View | 18:08.76 | -- |
| 11 | Reagan Hiebert | St. Mary (Kan.) | 18:28.73 | -- |
| 12 | Abbey Gentz | Huntington | DNF | -- |

==== 60 meter hurdles ====
- Final results shown, not prelims

| Rank | Name | University | Time | Team score |
|---|---|---|---|---|
| 1st place, gold medalist(s) | Salieci Myles | William Carey | 8.20 | 10 |
| 2nd place, silver medalist(s) | Kiya Pogue | Indiana Tech | 8.36 | 8 |
| 3rd place, bronze medalist(s) | Jaunita Webster-Freeman | Indiana Tech | 8.48 (8.471) | 6 |
| 4 | Gizel Clayton | Central Methodist | 8.48 (8.479) | 5 |
| 5 | Erin Oleksak | Marian (Ind.) | 8.49 | 4 |
| 6 | Patience Sakeuh | Taylor | 8.65 | 3 |
| 7 | Katlyn Jones | Indiana Tech | 8.66 (8.651) | 2 |
| 8 | Abu Joy | William Carey | 8.66 (8.657) | 1 |

==== 4 x 400 meters relay ====
- Final results shown, not prelims

| Rank | University | Time | Team score |
|---|---|---|---|
| 1st place, gold medalist(s) | Life | 3:39.48 | 10 |
| 2nd place, silver medalist(s) | William Carey | 3:43.54 | 8 |
| 3rd place, bronze medalist(s) | Olivet Nazarene | 3:44.51 | 6 |
| 4 | Madonna | 3:46.10 | 5 |
| 5 | Southeastern U. | 3:48.12 | 4 |
| 6 | Concordia (Neb.) | 3:48.88 | 3 |
| 7 | Central Methodist | 3:49.10 | 2 |
| 8 | Indiana Tech | 3:55.56 | 1 |

==== 4 x 800 meters relay ====
- Final results shown, not prelims

| Rank | University | Time | Team score |
|---|---|---|---|
| 1st place, gold medalist(s) | Grace | 9:05.60 | 10 |
| 2nd place, silver medalist(s) | Dordt | 9:11.47 | 8 |
| 3rd place, bronze medalist(s) | Indiana Tech | 9:15.94 | 6 |
| 4 | Benedictine (Kan.) | 9:17.87 | 5 |
| 5 | Oklahoma City | 9:25.63 | 4 |
| 6 | Cumberlands | 9:25.86 | 3 |
| 7 | The Master's | 9:38.65 | 2 |
| 8 | Eastern Oregon | 9:45.74 | 1 |

==== Distance medley relay ====
- Final results shown, not prelims

| Rank | University | Time | Team score |
|---|---|---|---|
| 1st place, gold medalist(s) | Huntington | 11:46.74 | 10 |
| 2nd place, silver medalist(s) | Milligan | 11:51.33 | 8 |
| 3rd place, bronze medalist(s) | College of Idaho | 11:51.89 | 6 |
| 4 | The Master's | 11:53.84 | 5 |
| 5 | Indiana Tech | 11:54.59 | 4 |
| 6 | Grace | 11:59.83 | 3 |
| 7 | Aquinas | 12:01.53 | 2 |
| 8 | St. Francis (Ill.) | 12:02.20 | 1 |
| 9 | Cornerstone | 12:03.29 | -- |
| 10 | Goshen | 12:14.34 | -- |
| 11 | Indiana Wesleyan | 12:23.55 | -- |
| 12 | Montreat | 12:43.61 | -- |

==== High jump ====
- Final results shown, not prelims

| Rank | Name | University | Best jump | Team score |
|---|---|---|---|---|
| 1st place, gold medalist(s) | Jennah Carpenter | Lewis-Clark | 1.73 m (5 ft 8 in) | 10 |
| 2nd place, silver medalist(s) | Erica Xayarath | Huntington | 1.73 m (5 ft 8 in) | 8 |
| 3rd place, bronze medalist(s) | Emma Valentine | Siena Heights | 1.70 m (5 ft 6 3/4 in) | 6 |
| 4 | Jaunita Webster-Freeman | Indiana Tech | 1.70 m (5 ft 6 3/4 in) | 5 |
| 5 | Erin Oleksak | Marian (Ind.) | 1.67 m (5 ft 5 1/2 in) | 4 |
| 6 | Paige Manney | Tennessee Wesleyan | 1.67 m (5 ft 5 1/2 in) | 3 |
| 7 | Abi Stevens | Southern Oregon | 1.67 m (5 ft 5 1/2 in) | 2 |
| 8 | Delaney Miller | Central Methodist | 1.64 m (5 ft 4 1/2 in) | 1 |
| 9 | Lizzy Grandle | Eastern Oregon | 1.64 m (5 ft 4 1/2 in) | -- |
| 10 | Kaitlyn Becnel | Loyola-New Orleans | 1.64 m (5 ft 4 1/2 in) | -- |
| 10 | Emma Pavelek | Point Park | 1.64 m (5 ft 4 1/2 in) | -- |
| 12 | Madison Axsom | Goshen | 1.64 m (5 ft 4 1/2 in) | -- |
| 13 | Abi Hume | Indiana Wesleyan | 1.59 m (5 ft 2 1/2 in) | -- |
| 13 | Hannah Newton | Concordia (Neb.) | 1.59 m (5 ft 2 1/2 in) | -- |
| 15 | Braely Herrema | Cornerstone | 1.59 m (5 ft 2 1/2 in) | -- |
| 15 | Aiana Colas | Keiser | 1.59 m (5 ft 2 1/2 in) | - |
| 15 | Kaitlin Essig | Cornerstone | 1.59 m (5 ft 2 1/2 in) | - |
| 15 | Ashlynn Perkins | Graceland | 1.59 m (5 ft 2 1/2 in) | - |

==== Pole vault ====
- Final results shown, not prelims

| Rank | Name | University | Best jump | Team score |
|---|---|---|---|---|
| 1st place, gold medalist(s) | Josie Puelz | Concordia (Neb.) | 3.97 m (13 ft 1/4 in) | 10 |
| 2nd place, silver medalist(s) | Margherita Conrad | Siena Heights | 3.87 m (12 ft 8 1/4 in) | 8 |
| 3rd place, bronze medalist(s) | Ashley VerPlank | Cornerstone | 3.87 m (12 ft 8 1/4 in) | 6 |
| 4 | Tyler Fugate | Siena Heights | 3.87 m (12 ft 8 1/4 in) | 5 |
| 5 | Erica Albrecht | Siena Heights | 3.82 m (12 ft 6 1/4 in) | 4 |
| 6 | Khristen Bryant | Columbia (Mo.) | 3.82 m (12 ft 6 1/4 in) | 3 |
| 7 | Erin Mapson | Concordia (Neb.) | 3.67 m (12 ft 1/4 in) | 2 |
| 8 | Nevaeh Brown | Midway | 3.67 m (12 ft 1/4 in) | 1 |
| 9 | Samantha Nowell | Siena Heights | 3.62 m (11 ft 10 1/2 in) | -- |
| 10 | Chasity Mies | Siena Heights | 3.62 m (11 ft 10 1/2 in) | -- |
| 11 | Abby Rumohr | Westmont | 3.62 m (11 ft 10 1/2 in) | -- |
| 12 | Madison Wahl | Dickinson St. | 3.62 m (11 ft 10 1/2 in) | -- |
| 13 | Sophia Sumer | Bethel (Ind.) | 3.62 m (11 ft 10 1/2 in) | -- |
| 14 | Erin Boggs | Concordia (Neb.) | 3.57 m (11 ft 8 1/2 in) | -- |
| 15 | Kennedy Stanley | Doane | 3.57 m (11 ft 8 1/2 in) | -- |
| 16 | Kayla Svoboda | Concordia (Neb.) | 3.52 m (11 ft 6 1/2 in) | -- |
| 16 | Bailey Nuutinen | Viterbo | 3.52 m (11 ft 6 1/2 in) | -- |

==== Long jump ====
- Final results shown, not prelims

| Rank | Name | University | Best jump | Team score |
|---|---|---|---|---|
| 1st place, gold medalist(s) | Machaeda Linton | William Carey | 6.14 m (20 ft 1 1/2 in) | 10 |
| 2nd place, silver medalist(s) | Maisonne Jones | USC-Beaufort | 5.98 m (19 ft 7 1/4 in) | 8 |
| 3rd place, bronze medalist(s) | Alexia Schofield | Campbellsville | 5.71 m (18 ft 8 3/4 in) | 6 |
| 4 | Jaunita Webster-Freeman | Indiana Tech | 5.70 m (18 ft 8 1/4 in) | 4 |
| 4 | Alexia Boyd | Campbellsville | 5.70 m (18 ft 8 1/4 in) | 4 |
| 4 | Erica Xayarath | Huntington | 5.70 m (18 ft 8 1/4 in) | 4 |
| 7 | Paige Manney | Tennessee Wesleyan | 5.69 m (18 ft 8 in) | 2 |
| 8 | Carlie Turner | Indiana Tech | 5.68 m (18 ft 7 1/2 in) | 1 |
| 9 | Anna Cabrera | Mobile | 5.67 m (18 ft 7 in) | -- |
| 10 | Erin Oleksak | Marian (Ind.) | 5.62 m (18 ft 5 1/4 in) | -- |
| 10 | Brandy Mackey | Voorhees | 5.62 m (18 ft 5 1/4 in) | -- |
| 12 | Jai-Lyn Norwood | Marian (Ind.) | 5.59 m (18 ft 4 in) | -- |
| 13 | Morgan Vargo | Cornerstone | 5.57 m (18 ft 3 1/4 in) | -- |
| 14 | Nevagant Jones | William Carey | 5.53 m (18 ft 1 1/2 in) | -- |
| 15 | Patience Sakeuh | Taylor | 5.52 m (18 ft 1 1/4 in) | -- |
| 16 | Anajah Gomillia | Indiana Tech | 5.51 m (18 ft 3/4 in) | -- |

==== Triple jump ====
- Final results shown, not prelims

| Rank | Name | University | Best jump | Team score |
|---|---|---|---|---|
| 1st place, gold medalist(s) | Paige Manney | Tennessee Wesleyan | 12.55 m (41 ft 2 in) | 10 |
| 2nd place, silver medalist(s) | Jah'lia Evans | Voorhees | 12.38 m (40 ft 7 1/4 in) | 8 |
| 3rd place, bronze medalist(s) | Chasity Veals | Langston | 12.31 m (40 ft 4 1/2 in) | 6 |
| 4 | Machaeda Linton | William Carey | 12.26 m (40 ft 2 1/2 in) | 5 |
| 5 | Alexia Schofield | Campbellsville | 12.19 m (39 ft 11 3/4 in) | 4 |
| 6 | Nevagant Jones | William Carey | 12.14 m (39 ft 9 3/4 in) | 3 |
| 7 | Destiny Copeland | Huntington | 12.12 m (39 ft 9 in) | 2 |
| 8 | Jai-Lyn Norwood | Marian (Ind.) | 12.10 m (39 ft 8 1/4 in) | 1 |
| 9 | Jaunita Webster-Freeman | Indiana Tech | 11.91 m (39 ft 3/4 in) | -- |
| 10 | Julia Morris | Cumberlands | 11.86 m (38 ft 10 3/4 in) | -- |
| 11 | Selena Johnson | Warner | 11.85 m (38 ft 10 1/2 in) | -- |
| 12 | Miyah Ford | Southeastern U. | 11.80 m (38 ft 8 1/2 in) | -- |
| 13 | Zaniyah Wilson | William Carey | 11.76 m (38 ft 6 3/4 in) | -- |
| 14 | Jessica Gakeri | Montreat | 11.73 m (38 ft 5 3/4 in) | -- |
| 14 | Alana Mack | Cumberland (Tenn.) | 11.73 m (38 ft 5 3/4 in) | -- |
| 16 | Katlyn Jones | Indiana Tech | 11.63 m (38 ft 1 3/4 in) | -- |

==== Weight throw ====
- Final results shown, not prelims

| Rank | Name | University | Best Throw | Team score |
|---|---|---|---|---|
| 1st place, gold medalist(s) | Jessa Eden | Hastings | 18.02 m (59 ft 1 1/4 in) | 10 |
| 2nd place, silver medalist(s) | Arriana Benjamin | Marian (Ind.) | 17.81 m (58 ft 5 in) | 8 |
| 3rd place, bronze medalist(s) | Kiara Anderson | Hastings | 17.72 m (58 ft 1 1/2 in) | 6 |
| 4 | Madison Green | Grand View | 17.68 m (58 ft 0 in) | 5 |
| 5 | Macy Fuller | Doane | 17.60 m (57 ft 8 3/4 in) | 4 |
| 6 | Emilee Kessler | Madonna | 17.17 m (56 ft 3 3/4 in) | 3 |
| 7 | Kori Nagel | Dickinson St. | 17.05 m (55 ft 11 1/4 in) | 2 |
| 8 | Maggie Ledbetter | Eastern Oregon | 16.69 m (54 ft 9 in) | 1 |
| 9 | Katie French | William Woods | 16.65 m (54 ft 7 1/2 in) | -- |
| 10 | Madison Sutton | Benedictine (Kan.) | 16.44 m (53 ft 11 in) | -- |
| 11 | Cassandra Pine | Hastings | 16.35 m (53 ft 7 1/2 in) | -- |
| 12 | Madeleine Robinson | Concordia (Neb.) | 16.34 m (53 ft 7 1/4 in) | -- |
| 13 | Courtney Hall | Olivet Nazarene | 16.21 m (53 ft 2 in) | -- |
| 13 | Deneara Mboug | Indiana Tech | 16.21 m (53 ft 2 in) | -- |
| 15 | Baylee Beard | Central Methodist | 16.12 m (52 ft 10 1/2 in) | -- |
| 16 | Kenna Woodward | Eastern Oregon | 16.08 m (52 ft 9 in) | -- |

==== Shot put ====
- Final results shown, not prelims

| Rank | Name | University | Best throw | Team score |
|---|---|---|---|---|
| 1st place, gold medalist(s) | Princess Kara | Indiana Wesleyan | 15.25 m (50 ft 1/4 in) | 10 |
| 2nd place, silver medalist(s) | Allison Skala | Doane | 14.46 m (47 ft 5 1/4 in) | 8 |
| 3rd place, bronze medalist(s) | Jaunita Webster-Freeman | Indiana Tech | 14.28 m (46 ft 10 in) | 6 |
| 4 | Kiara Anderson | Hastings | 14.26 m (46 ft 9 1/4 in) | 5 |
| 5 | Alivia Baucom | Doane | 14.17 m (46 ft 5 3/4 in) | 4 |
| 6 | Kori Nagel | Dickinson St. | 14.17 m (46 ft 5 3/4 in) | 3 |
| 7 | Abigail Gerber | Concordia (Neb.) | 14.04 m (46 ft 3/4 in) | 2 |
| 8 | Claire Caspersen | St. Mary (Neb.) | 14.04 m (46 ft 3/4 in) | 1 |
| 9 | Bre Nail | Mount Mercy | 13.94 m (45 ft 8 3/4 in) | -- |
| 10 | Maggie Ledbetter | Eastern Oregon | 13.86 m (45 ft 5 1/2 in) | -- |
| 11 | Levonis Davis | Life | 13.85 m (45 ft 5 1/4 in) | -- |
| 12 | Arriana Benjamin | Marian (Ind.) | 13.57 m (44 ft 6 1/4 in) | -- |
| 13 | Katie French | William Woods | 13.53 m (44 ft 4 1/2 in) | -- |
| 14 | Annah Miller | St. Ambrose | 13.35 m (43 ft 9 1/2 in) | -- |
| 15 | Fedra Florentin | Mobile | 13.29 m (43 ft 7 in) | -- |
| 16 | Madison Green | Grand View | 13.15 m (43 ft 1 1/2 in) | -- |

==== Pentathlon ====
- Final results shown, not prelims

| Rank | Name | University | Overall points | 60 m H | HJ | SP | LJ | 800 m |
|---|---|---|---|---|---|---|---|---|
| 1st place, gold medalist(s) | Jaunita Webster-Freeman | Indiana Tech | 4258 | 1017; 8.50 | 855; 1.70 m (5 ft 6 3/4 in) | 833; 14.58 m (47 ft 10 in) | 765; 5.72 m (18 ft 9 in) | 788; 2:22.67 |
| 2nd place, silver medalist(s) | Erin Oleksak | Marian (Ind.) | 3769 | 1002; 8.57 | 855; 1.70 m (5 ft 6 3/4 in) | 423; 8.37 m (27 ft 5 1/2 in) | 741; 5.64 m (18 ft 6 in) | 748; 2:25.70 |
| 3rd place, bronze medalist(s) | Kaitlyn McColly | Dickinson St. | 3652 | 980; 8.67 | 644; 1.52 m (4 ft 11 3/4 in) | 634; 11.59 m (38 ft 1/4 in) | 668; 5.39 m (17 ft 8 in) | 726; 2:27.35 |
| 4 | Abby Clark | Montana Tech | 3550 | 828; 9.40 | 818; 1.67 m (5 ft 5 1/2 in) | 547; 10.27 m (33 ft 8 1/4 in) | 626; 5.24 m (17 ft 2 1/4 in) | 731; 2:27.02 |
| 5 | Carly Lindenmeyer | MidAmerica Nazarene | 3440 | 840; 9.34 | 818; 1.67 m (5 ft 5 1/2 in) | 408; 8.14 m (26 ft 8 1/4 in) | 712; 5.54 m (18 ft 2 in) | 662; 2:32.52 |
| 6 | Abi Stevens | Southern Oregon | 3414 | 820; 9.44 | 818; 1.67 m (5 ft 5 1/2 in) | 482; 9.27 m (30 ft 4 3/4 in) | 554; 4.98 m (16 ft 4 in) | 740; 2:26.26 |
| 7 | Jordynn Toliver | Jamestown | 3400 | 812; 9.48 | 644; 1.52 m (4 ft 11 3/4 in) | 613; 11.27 m (36 ft 11 1/2 in) | 595; 5.13 m (16 ft 9 3/4 in) | 736; 2:26.58 |
| 8 | Jennah Carpenter | Lewis-Clark | 3375 | 842; 9.33 | 818; 1.67 m (5 ft 5 1/2 in) | 500; 9.55 m (31 ft 3 3/4 in) | 614; 5.20 m (17 ft 1/2 in) | 601; 2:37.61 |
| 9 | Sarah Bolton | Georgetown (Ky.) | 3355 | 862; 9.23 | 678; 1.55 m (5 ft 1 in) | 544; 10.22 m (33 ft 6 1/4 in) | 598; 5.14 m (16 ft 10 1/4 in) | 673; 2:31.61 |
| 10 | Jocelyn Jenkins | MidAmerica Nazarene | 3348 | 914; 8.98 | 712; 1.58 m (5 ft 2 in) | 470; 9.09 m (29 ft 9 3/4 in) | 562; 5.01 m (16 ft 5 in) | 690; 2:30.21 |
| 11 | Amy Richert | Concordia (Neb.) | 3292 | 862; 9.23 | 678; 1.55 m (5 ft 1 in) | 565; 10.54 m (34 ft 6 3/4 in) | 592; 5.12 m (16 ft 9 1/2 in) | 595; 2:38.07 |
| 12 | Lindsay Adams | Doane | 3168 | 850; 9.29 | 544; 1.43 m (4 ft 8 1/4 in) | 554; 10.37 m (34 ft 1/4 in) | 573; 5.05 m (16 ft 6 3/4 in) | 647; 2:33.68 |
| 13 | Cailyn Pentecost | Bethel (Ind.) | 3167 | 758; 9.76 | 644; 1.52 m (4 ft 11 3/4 in) | 619; 11.37 m (37 ft 3 1/2 in) | 578; 5.07 m (16 ft 7 1/2 in) | 568; 2:40.44 |
| 14 | Katie Lambrecht | St. Ambrose | 3122 | 800; 9.54 | 644; 1.52 m (4 ft 11 3/4 in) | 473; 9.13 m (29 ft 11 1/4 in) | 535; 4.91 m (16 ft 1 1/4 in) | 670; 2:31.87 |
| 15 | Lizzy Grandle | Eastern Oregon | 3086 | 798; 9.55 | 678; 1.55 m (5 ft 1 in) | 580; 10.77 m (35 ft 4 in) | 532; 4.90 m (16 ft 3/4 in) | 498; 2:46.75 |
| 16 | Karli Bedard | Eastern Oregon | 3076 | 781; 9.64 | 610; 1.49 m (4 ft 10 1/2 in) | 493; 9.44 m (30 ft 11 1/2 in) | 519; 4.85 m (15 ft 10 3/4 in) | 673; 2:31.60 |

==== 3000 meters racewalk ====
- Final results shown, not prelims

| Rank | Name | University | Time | Team score |
|---|---|---|---|---|
| 1st place, gold medalist(s) | Izabelle Trefts | Columbia (S.C.) | 14:31.74 | 10 |
| 2nd place, silver medalist(s) | Victoria Heiser-Whatley | Columbia (S.C.) | 15:31.67 | 8 |
| 3rd place, bronze medalist(s) | Yanira Deana Paninka | Central Methodist | 15:34.95 | 6 |
| 4 | Ainhoa Colino | Columbia (S.C.) | 15:45.63 | 5 |
| 5 | Jessica Heiser-Whatley | Columbia (S.C.) | 16:08.76 | 4 |
| 6 | Baileigh Morris | Central Methodist | 16:32.33 | 3 |
| 7 | Paige Thompson | Grand View | 16:37.04 | 2 |
| 8 | Jenna Grogan | Cumberlands | 16:43.56 | 1 |
| 9 | Tara Todd | Cumberlands | 16:48.41 | -- |
| 10 | Tristyn DiPentino | Hastings | 17:06.31 | -- |
| 11 | Beth Rodriguez | Judson | 17:18.03 | -- |
| 12 | Lanie Pocock | Indiana Kokomo | 17:19.94 | -- |
| 13 | Faith Younce | Iowa Wesleyan | 17:27.94 | -- |
| 14 | Alanna Rodriguez | St. Xavier | 17:41.05 | -- |
| 15 | Abby Hill | Mount Mercy | 17:46.17 | -- |
| 16 | Allison Morris | Iowa Wesleyan | 18:40.30 | -- |

=== Women's team scores ===
- Top 10 and ties shown

| Rank | University | Team score |
|---|---|---|
| 1st place, gold medalist(s) | Indiana Tech | 85 points |
| 2nd place, silver medalist(s) | Huntington | 64 points |
| 3rd place, bronze medalist(s) | William Carey | 58 points |
| 4 | Life | 50 points |
| 5 | Milligan | 29 points |
| 6 | Concordia (Neb.) | 28 points |
| 7 | Columbia (S.C.) | 27 points |
| 8 | Central Methodist | 25 points |
| 8 | Marian (Ind.) | 25 points |
| 10 | Hastings | 23 points |

== Post Meet Awards ==
Men's Outstanding Performer: Jacob Ulrich from Life University (GA) - His time of 1:16.34 in the 600m ranks #9 in the world in 2023

Men's Most Valuable Performer: William Jones from Life University (GA) - He scored 20 points by winning the long jump and the triple jump

Men's Coach of the Year: Nick Dodson from Southeastern University (FL)

Women's Outstanding Performer: Jaunita Webster-Freeman from Indiana Tech - She set a meet record in the pentathlon and won all five events

Women's Most Valuable Performer: Addy Wiley from Huntington (IN) – She scored 42.5 points by winning five events: 600m, 800m, mile, 3000m, and Distance Medley Relay

Women's Coach of the Year: Doug Edgar from Indiana Tech

== See also ==
- National Association of Intercollegiate Athletics (NAIA)
- NCAA Men's Division I Indoor Track and Field Championships
- NCAA Women's Division I Indoor Track and Field Championships
