= Gregg M. Caggianelli =

Amiercan Catholic priest and bishop-elect

His Excellency, The Most Reverend Gregg Michael Caggianelli
- Auxiliary Bishop for the Military Services, USA; Titular Bishop of Gemellae in Byzacena
- Archdiocese: Military Services, USA
- Appointed: February 21, 2025
- Installed: May 9, 2025
- Other post: Titular Bishop of Gemellae in Byzacena

Orders
- Ordination: October 25, 2002 by John Joseph Nevins
- Consecration: May 9, 2025 by Timothy Broglio, Frank Joseph Dewane, and David Toups

Personal details
- Born: August 2, 1968 (age 58) Kingston, New York, U.S.
- Education: University of Michigan (BSE); University of Dayton (MSE); St. Vincent de Paul Regional Seminary (MDiv); Aquinas Institute of Theology (DMin)
- Motto: My grace Is sufficient

Styles of Gregg Michael Caggianelli
- Reference style: His Excellency; The Most Reverend
- Spoken style: Your Excellency
- Religious style: Bishop

Gregg Michael Caggianelli (August 2, 1968) is an American prelate of the Catholic Church who has been serving as an auxiliary bishop for the Archdiocese for the Military Services, USA since 2025.

== Biography ==
=== Early life ===
Caggianelli was born on August 2, 1969, in Kingston, New York. In 1990, he received a Bachelor of Science degree in aerospace engineering from the University of Michigan in Ann Arbor. After his college graduation, Caggianelli commissioned as an officer in the US Air Force. He was assigned to the Air Force Research Laboratory at Wright-Patterson Air Force Base in Ohio. While still in the Air Force, Caggianelli received a Master of Science in mechanical engineering in 1994 from the University of Dayton in Dayton, Ohio.

Deciding to become a priest, Caggianelli left the Air Force in 1996 while joining the Air Force Reserves. That same year, he entered the St. Vincent de Paul Regional Seminary in Boynton Beach, Florida. He received a Master of Divinity degree there.

=== Priesthood ===
On October 25, 2002, Caggianelli was ordained to the priesthood for the Diocese of Venice in Florida at the Cathedral of the Epiphany in Venice by Bishop John Joseph Nevins. After his ordination, the diocese assigned him as parochial vicar at Incarnation Parish in Sarasota, Florida. He was also named as associate director of vocations and seminary formation in 2006, becoming director of that office in 2007.

Caggianelli left Incarnation in 2010 to serve as administrator of Saint Francis Xavier Parish in Fort Myers, Florida. In 2013, he was named vice rector at St. Vincent de Paul. Caggianelli later attended the Aquinas Institute of Theology in St. Louis, Missouri, where he received a Doctor of Ministry in 2020.

=== Auxiliary Bishop of the Military Services, USA ===
Pope Francis appointed Caggianelli as an auxiliary bishop of the Military Services, USA on February 21, 2025. On May 9, 2025, he was consecrated as a bishop at the St. Vincent de Paul chapel.

As of 2025, Caggianelli is serving as the mobilization assistant to the Chaplain of the U.S. Air Force Academy in Colorado Springs, Colorado.

== See also ==
- Catholic Church hierarchy
- Catholic Church in the United States
- Historical list of the Catholic bishops of the United States
- List of Catholic bishops of the United States
- Lists of patriarchs, archbishops, and bishops

Catholic Church titles
Preceded by -	Auxiliary Bishop for the Military Services, USA; 2025-Present	Succeeded by -
