= City of Palms Classic =

U.S. high school basketball tournament

The City of Palms Classic is an annual high school basketball tournament held in Fort Myers, Florida. It is generally recognized as the nation's best bracketed holiday event.

== History ==
The tournament began in 1973 as a high school boys' basketball tournament with a seven-team format. The earliest editions featured teams primarily from the Fort Myers News-Press' high school coverage area, but there were some quality teams from around the state, including Lakeland High, Brandon, Pompano Beach, Glades Central and Okeechobee.

In 1985, Bill Pollock, a Fort Myers resident whose son, John, was a rising senior at Fort Myers High School, became involved in the tournament, as did News-Press preps editor Donnie Wilkie. The two teamed for more than three decades and the tournament, sponsored by Bank of America (formerly Barnett Bank and NationsBank) and later Culligan, quickly skyrocketed into a major national event. Pollock's son helped Fort Myers to the 1985 tournament championship against a still-mostly-local field and is now the President of Classic Basketball Inc. Currently, the tournament consists of a 16-team national bracket, with a pair of smaller brackets—four-team "Sunshine Series" (featuring additional teams from mostly Florida and Georgia) and "Signature Series" (non-traditional schools and unsanctioned academies) tournaments. The tournament typically spans six days, and has been played the week before Christmas since 1991.

Among the City of Palms' early breakthroughs was a riveting, triple-overtime championship game in 1989, in which Flint Hill School, led by Randolph Childress, Cory Alexander and Serge Zwikker, defeated Abraham Lincoln High School (Brooklyn, New York), led by Norman "Jou Jou" Marbury and Tchaka Shipp, 70–68, on a last-second 3-pointer by Childress, who went on to stardom at Wake Forest University.

Oak Hill Academy (Mouth of Wilson, Virginia) made its first appearance in 1991, finishing third after losing to Franklin Learning Center from Philadelphia in the semifinals. Two years later, in 1993, the tournament made history with a field that included Danny Fortson, Ron Mercer, Tim Thomas and future NFL quarterback Daunte Culpepper — all in consolation brackets. Crenshaw High School (Los Angeles, California) won that year's tournament, scoring 117, 99 and 98 points in three of its four games, and finished the season ranked No. 3 in the nation by USA Today. St. Augustine High School (New Orleans, Louisiana) won the following year and went on to capture USA Today's mythical national championship in boys' basketball. The success in the early and mid 1990s catapulted the tournament into national prominence.

The tournament has remained a highlight on the national schedule ever since, drawing the interest of major-college coaches and recruiting analysts alike. By 2024, 211 McDonald's All-Americans have played in the event, and as of 2024, 133 players had been selected in the first round of the NBA draft.

Montverde Academy became the first school to win consecutive City of Palms Classic titles since the tournament expanded beyond local teams in 2013, defeating Paul VI High School, and the Eagles have gone on to win five tourney titles under head coach Kevin Boyle. Montverde's first two championship wins were led by stars Dakari Johnson (2012), D'Angelo Russell (2012/13), and Ben Simmons (2013), and its most recent championship runs were powered by Cade Cunningham in 2021 and Cooper Flagg in 2023, respectively.

Montverde's last two losses at the City of Palms came in the 2014 championship game to Wheeler High School and star player Jaylen Brown and a 2015 quarterfinal to Chino Hills High School, who defeated The Patrick School from Elizabeth, New Jersey, in the last tournament played at Verot. The Patrick School was coached by Mike Rice, on the sidelines for the first time since being fired as the Rutgers coach. The tournament moved into the new Suncoast Credit Union Arena at Florida SouthWestern State College in December 2016.

In 2020, the tournament was canceled due to the COVID-19 pandemic. It was the first time in the 48-year history that the tournament was canceled. The tournament resumed the following year, in 2021.

== Locations ==
The event has had six hosts in its 51-year history, including Edison Community College (Fort Myers, Florida) from 1973 to 1983 and twice more in 1990 and '93, Cape Coral High School (Cape Coral, Florida) in 1984, Fort Myers High School (Fort Myers, Florida) from 1985 to 1989 and the Harborside Convention Hall in downtown Fort Myers in 1991 and '92. The tournament found a long-term home when a new, 2,300-seat gymnasium was built at Bishop Verot High School (Fort Myers, Florida), where it was played from 1994 to 2015. In 2016, the tournament moved to Suncoast Credit Union Arena, a 3,300-seat facility on the campus of Florida SouthWestern State College and remains there as of December 2024.

== Organizers ==
- Hugh Thimlar, then-coach at Edison Community College, now known as Florida SouthWestern State College, and a small group of high school coaches and administrators guided the tournament through its early years. Thimlar's goals were to showcase the top talent in Southwest Florida, while also bolstering his recruiting.
- Bill Pollock, a local businessman, served as the President of Classic Basketball, Inc., for most of his 36-year tenure. He retired in 2021.
- Donnie Wilkie, the Tournament Director since 1985 and Vice President of Classic Basketball, Inc., named the annual event the "City of Palms Classic" in 1987, after The News-Press declined to continue as its title sponsor. His primary functions are the nationwide recruitment of teams and the tournament's format and scheduling.
- Though there have been numerous "Executive Directors" through the years, the two most recent — John Naylor (2015–22) and Mary Schaack (2022-present) — vastly expanded the tournament's sponsor base and overall financial well-being, despite the 2020 cancellation.

== Past winners ==
- 2025: Paul VI Catholic High School (Chantilly, Virginia)
- 2024: Columbus High School (Miami, Florida)
- 2023: Montverde Academy (Montverde, Florida)
- 2022: Imhotep (Philadelphia, Pennsylvania)
- 2021: Montverde Academy (Montverde, Florida)
- 2020: Tournament canceled due to COVID-19 pandemic
- 2019: Montverde Academy (Montverde, Florida)
- 2018: McEachern High School (Powder Springs, Georgia)
- 2017: University School (Fort Lauderdale, Florida)
- 2016: Montverde Academy (Montverde, Florida)
- 2015: Chino Hills High School (Chino Hills, California)
- 2014: Wheeler High School (Marietta, Georgia)
- 2013: Montverde Academy (Montverde, Florida)
- 2012: Montverde Academy (Montverde, Florida)
- 2011: Prestonwood Christian Academy (Plano, Texas)
- 2010: St. Patrick High School Academy (Elizabeth, New Jersey)
- 2009: Paterson Catholic High School (Paterson, New Jersey)
- 2008: Mater Dei High School (Santa Ana, California)
- 2007: St. Benedict's Preparatory School (Newark, New Jersey)
- 2006: Mater Dei High School (Santa Ana, California)
- 2005: Brentwood Academy (Brentwood, Tennessee)
- 2004: Niagara Falls High School (Niagara Falls, New York)
- 2003: Westchester Enriched Sciences Magnets (Los Angeles)
- 2002: Rice High School (Manhattan, New York)
- 2001: Westchester Enriched Sciences Magnets (Los Angeles, California)
- 2000: Westchester Enriched Sciences Magnets (Los Angeles, California)
- 1999: Ballard High School (Louisville, Kentucky)
- 1998: Scott County High School (Georgetown, Kentucky)
- 1997: Parkview Baptist High School (Baton Rouge, Louisiana)
- 1996: Miami Senior High School (Miami, Florida), Classic I;
- Lexington Catholic High School (Lexington, Kentucky), Classic II
- 1995: Dominguez High School (Compton, California)
- 1994: St. Augustine High School (New Orleans, Louisiana)
- 1993: Crenshaw High School (Los Angeles, California)
- 1992: Dunbar High School (Washington, D.C.)
- 1991: Miami Senior High School (Miami, Florida)
- 1990: Gibbs High School (St. Petersburg, Florida)
- 1989: Flint Hill School (Oakton, Virginia)
- 1988: Carol City High School (Miami, Florida)
- 1987: Jackson High School (Miami, Florida)
- 1986: Forrest High School (Jacksonville, Florida)
- 1985: Fort Myers High School (Fort Myers, Florida)
- 1984: Cypress Lake High School (Fort Myers, Florida)
- 1983 Cypress Lake High School (Fort Myers, Florida)
- 1982 Fort Myers Senior High School (Fort Myers, Florida)
- 1981 Cypress Lake High School (Fort Myers, Florida)
- 1980 Cypress Lake High School (Fort Myers, Florida)
- 1979 Cypress Lake High School (Fort Myers, Florida)
- 1978 Okeechobee (Okeechobee, Florida)
- 1977 Pompano Beach High (Pompano Beach, Florida)
- 1976 Pompano Beach High (Pompano Beach, Florida)
- 1975 Belle Glade Glades Central (Belle Glade, Florida)
- 1974 Fort Myers (Fort Myers, Florida)
- 1973 Immokalee (Immokalee, Florida)

== Historical Highlights ==
- Eighty-seven City of Palms participants were on National Basketball Association rosters at the start of the 2024–25 season, constituting nearly 20 percent of the entire league.
- More than 1,000 of the tournament's players have advanced to NCAA Division I competition, including 162 in 12 of the most prominent conferences during the 2023–24 season.
- Six former COP stars have been named the NBA's Rookie of the Year — Paolo Banchero (2022–23), Cade Cunningham (2021–22), LaMelo Ball (2020–21), Ben Simmons (2017–18), Andrew Wiggins (2014–15) and Tyreke Evans (2009–10).
- A stunning 18 Naismith Prep Players of the Year over the past three decades have played in at least one City of Palms Classic, including 11 of the past 14 from 2011 to 2024 — Cooper Flagg (2024), Isaiah Collier (2023), Dariq Whitehead (2022), Cade Cunningham (2020), R.J. Barrett (2018), Michael Porter, Jr. (2017), Lonzo Ball (2016), Ben Simmons (2015), Andrew Wiggins (2013), Shabazz Muhammad (2012), Austin Rivers (2011), Brandon Jennings (2008), Kevin Love (2007), Lou Williams (2005), Gerald Wallace (2000), Donnell Harvey (1999), Al Harrington (1998) and Ron Mercer (1995).
- The 2023 City of Palms Classic featured all five of the top-5 teams in the preseason BallisLife.com Fab 50, a first for any bracketed holiday tournament in the history of high school basketball. The top seed, Montverde Academy, defeated Long Island Lutheran 73–59 in the championship game, jumping out to a 9–0 lead and maintaining its lead throughout. Duke-bound Cooper Flagg had 21 points, 14 rebounds, 3 assists and 4 blocks and was named the tournament's Most Valuable Player.
- The 2015 tournament, won by Chino Hills, produced a record 17 NBA first-round draft choices, including 12 lottery picks.
- A book titled “Dunks, Threes & Palm Trees,” authored by former News-Press sports writer David Dorsey, chronicles the history of the storied high school basketball tournament and was published in coordination with the tournament's 50th Anniversary in 2023. https://www.amazon.com/Dunks-Threes-Palm-Trees-basketballs/dp/B0CK3MYJHN

== Hall of Fame ==
The tournament christened a "City of Palms Classic Hall of Fame" in coordination with its 50th Anniversary in 2023. The inaugural class included:

- Kevin Boyle, the all-time winningest coach in City of Palms Classic history (56–13, six championships in 19 appearances). His Montverde Academy teams have won 32 of 35 COP games while claiming five tournament titles since 2011. Boyle (344–26 at MVA, 854–158 overall) has won seven Chipotle Nationals and seven BallisLife Fab 50 national championships, including a 33-0 finish in 2023–24.
- Teddy Dupay, a local star and McDonald's All-American (1998) and the all-time leading scorer in Florida history with 3,744 points. His Mariner High School teams were 7–7 in four City of Palms Classics, and he scored 49 and 56 points in his final two COP games, earning co-MVP honors in 1997.
- Gary McKnight, the winningest active coach in high school basketball (1,272-140 overall) has presided over Mater Dei High School's storied program for 43 years, with 11 state titles and one national championship (2014). His Monarchs (28–10 in 10 appearances) won City of Palms Classic titles in 2006 and 2008.
- Bill Pollock served as the first President of Classic Basketball Inc. (1991–2021) during a 36-year tenure. His relationships with the community's leaders and businesses helped to exponentially grow the event's finances from its 1970s origins.
- Hugh Thimlar launched the tournament in 1973, at Edison Community College, now known as Florida SouthWestern State College, where he coached for 26 years. The Indiana Basketball Hall of Famer (2008) won 604 games over 40 seasons as a head coach and also founded the Indiana-Kentucky High School All-Star series.
