= Suncoast Credit Union Arena =

Multipurpose arena within Florida SouthWestern State College

- Interactive map of Suncoast Credit Union Arena
- Location: 13351 FSW Parkway; Fort Myers, Florida 33919
- Coordinates: 26.5478°N 81.8869°W
- Owner: Florida SouthWestern State College
- Operator: Florida SouthWestern State College
- Capacity: 3,500
- Surface: Hardwood

Construction
- Groundbreaking: April 23, 2015
- Opened: November 29, 2016
- Cost: $25,222,512 ($34.3 million in 2025 dollars)
- Architect: Harvard Jolly
- General contractor: Skanska

Tenants
- FSW Buccaneers men's and women's basketball FSW Buccaneers volleyball City of Palms Classic

Suncoast Credit Union Arena is a 75,000 sq ft (7,000 m^{2}) multipurpose arena on the campus of Florida SouthWestern State College (FSW) in Fort Myers, Florida. It is the home of the FSW Buccaneers men's and women's basketball and volleyball teams. It holds 3,500 people in basketball configuration. It also features six skyboxes, a hospitality event center, competition courts that convert into recreational courts, athletic office space, student, faculty and staff wellness, and an athletic center with a fitness pavilion, men's and women's locker rooms and a weight training area. It is also the home to the City of Palms Classic, an annual high school basketball tournament.

Suncoast Credit Union, a Tampa-based credit union with roots in serving educators, paid $5 million for the arena's naming rights.

Suncoast Credit Union Arena has hosted the Rocket Mortgage Fort Myers Tip-Off since it started in 2018. In 2020, the four team tournament included #1 ranked Gonzaga University and #6 ranked University of Kansas, as well as Auburn University and Saint Joseph's University.
