= Epiphany Cathedral (Venice, Florida) =

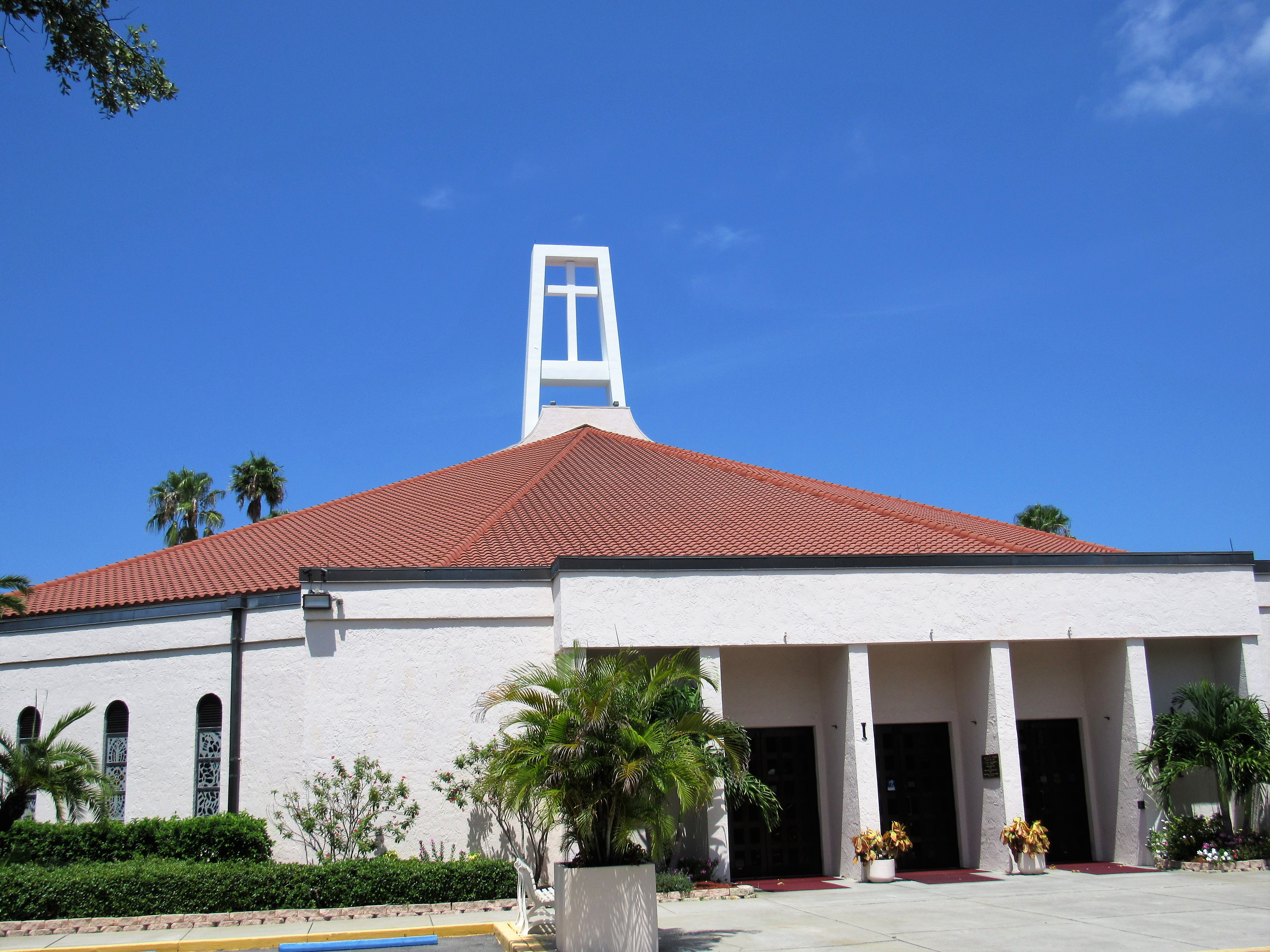

- Location in Florida Epiphany Cathedral (the United States)
- 27°06′04″N 82°26′56″W
- Location: 310 Sarasota St. Venice, Florida
- Country: United States
- Denomination: Roman Catholic Church
- Website: www.epiphanycathedral.org

History
- Founded: 1955

Architecture
- Style: Modern
- Completed: 1980

Administration
- Diocese: Venice in Florida

Clergy
- Bishop: Most Rev. Emilio Biosca Agüero
- Rector: Very Rev. Msgr. Patrick Dubois

Epiphany Cathedral is a Roman Catholic cathedral located in Venice, Florida, United States. It is the seat of the Diocese of Venice.

== History ==
=== Epiphany Parish ===
Epiphany Parish can trace its founding to 1935 when it became a mission station of St. Martha Parish in Sarasota, Florida. The mission was founded, in part, because the faculty and students at the Kentucky Military Institute had to make a 36-mile round trip journey to attend Mass in Sarasota. The first Mass in the mission was celebrated in the Gulf Theatre for 20 people. The Rev. Charles Elslander was the pastor at St. Martha's at the time. The first Epiphany Church was the former chapel from the Venice Army Airfield. It was moved from the base to the corner of Tampa Avenue and Nassau Street in 1947. It was purchased and furnished for $11,165.30. Epiphany became a parish on March 7, 1955, and the Rev. Michael M. Reynolds was named as the parish's first pastor. St. Raphael's Parish was founded from Epiphany in 1958.

Ground was broken for a new church in 1959 and it was completed the following year. The former church was renovated into a parish hall. A mission was established from Epiphany in Warm Mineral Springs. It became San Pedro Parish two years later. As the parish continued to expand Marian Hall was built in 1978 to accommodate more Masses and other parish functions. Ground for the present church was broken in February 1979. It was dedicated by Bishop W. Thomas Larkin of St. Petersburg on June 29, 1980. The previous church was remodeled for a parish hall and the original church was torn down.

=== Epiphany Cathedral ===
Pope John Paul II established the Diocese of Venice on June 16, 1984. Epiphany became the cathedral for the new diocese. Bishop John J. Nevins was installed as the diocese's first bishop. Two years later Our Lady of Lourdes Parish in Venice was founded from Epiphany Cathedral. Our Lady of Mt. Carmel Parish in Osprey was founded from the cathedral in 2001. On July 25, 2006 Frank J. Dewane was ordained coadjutor bishop of Venice. He was the first bishop ordained in the cathedral.

Plans for a major renovation of the cathedral began in 2021. Hurricane Ian in 2022 delayed the project's timeline. On May 30, 2024, Bishop Dewane led a groundbreaking service for the rebuilding project that is expected to last two years. Work will include a new front entrance and gathering space, a barrel vaulted ceiling, new furnishings and upgraded HVAC and other systems.

== Parish School ==
Epiphany School was started by Msgr. George W. Cummings in 1959 with 66 students in four grades. Classes were held at the Kentucky Military Institute until the parish school building was completed. The school building was originally a single story. A second story was added in 1966. Benedictine Sisters taught at the school from 1959 to 1968. They were replaced by Franciscan Sisters from Syracuse, New York and taught in the school until 1974. At that time two Benedictines joined the lay teachers on the staff. In 1977 they were joined by three School Sisters of Notre Dame and two Sisters of Charity of the Blessed Virgin Mary.

Kindergarten was added in 1978. Marion Hall, a multi-purpose facility, was built on the east side of the school in 1979. The following year grades 6-8 were formed into a middle school. A computer lab and a new playground were added in 1983. Pre-Kindergarten was added in 1987. As enrollment increased additions were made to the building. An annex was added to the south-side of the building in 1990. The cafeteria, media center, pre-school classrooms and music room were added between 1991 and 1993. An annex building replaced the former convent and the former rectory in 1996. Santa Maria Chapel was added to the school building in 1998. It was provided by a benefactor. Enrollment declined in the early 2000s and grades were reduced to one grade per classroom. The annex building was given to the parish to use for offices. In 2007 Epiphany School was given a Blue Ribbon of Excellence Award.

== Pastors/Rectors ==
The following priests have served as the pastor of Epiphany Parish and since 1984 as the cathedral rector:

- Msgr. Charles Elslander (Mission from Sarasota; 1935–1955)
- Rev. Michael M. Reynolds (1955)
- Rev. Noah E. Brunner (administrator; 1955–1956)
- Msgr. George W. Cummings (1956–1976)
- Rev. Esteban G. Soy (1976–1999)
- Rev. Robert R. Cannon (1999–2003)
- Rev. George Ratzmann (2003–2008)
- Rev. John F. Costello (2008–2021)
- Very Rev. Msgr. Patrick Dubois (2021–Present)

== See also ==
- List of Catholic cathedrals in the United States
- List of cathedrals in Florida
