= Southwest Florida Museum of History =

Coordinates: 26.6400°N 81.8662°W

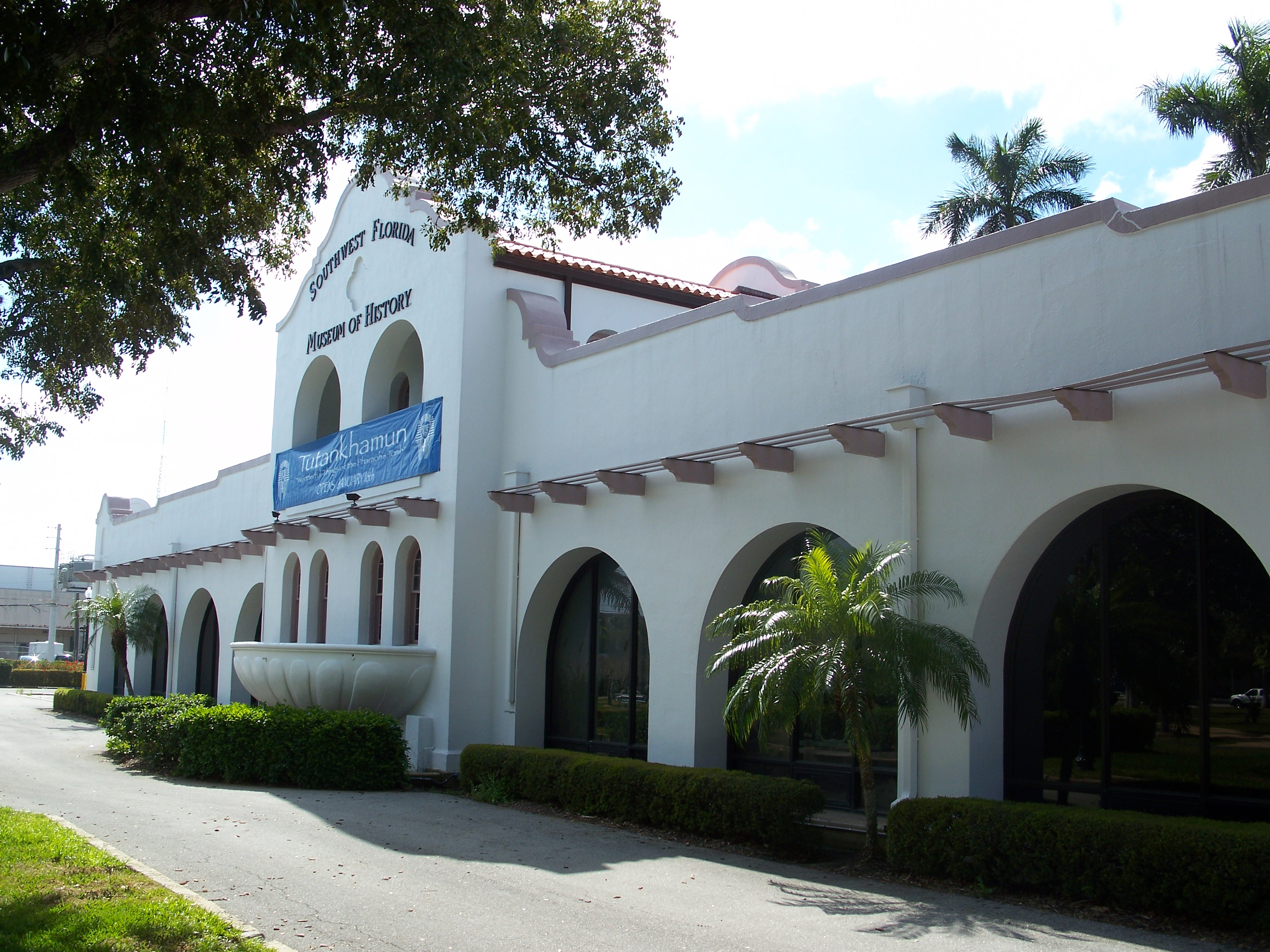
Southwest Florida Museum of History, housed in a former Atlantic Coast Line Railroad depot

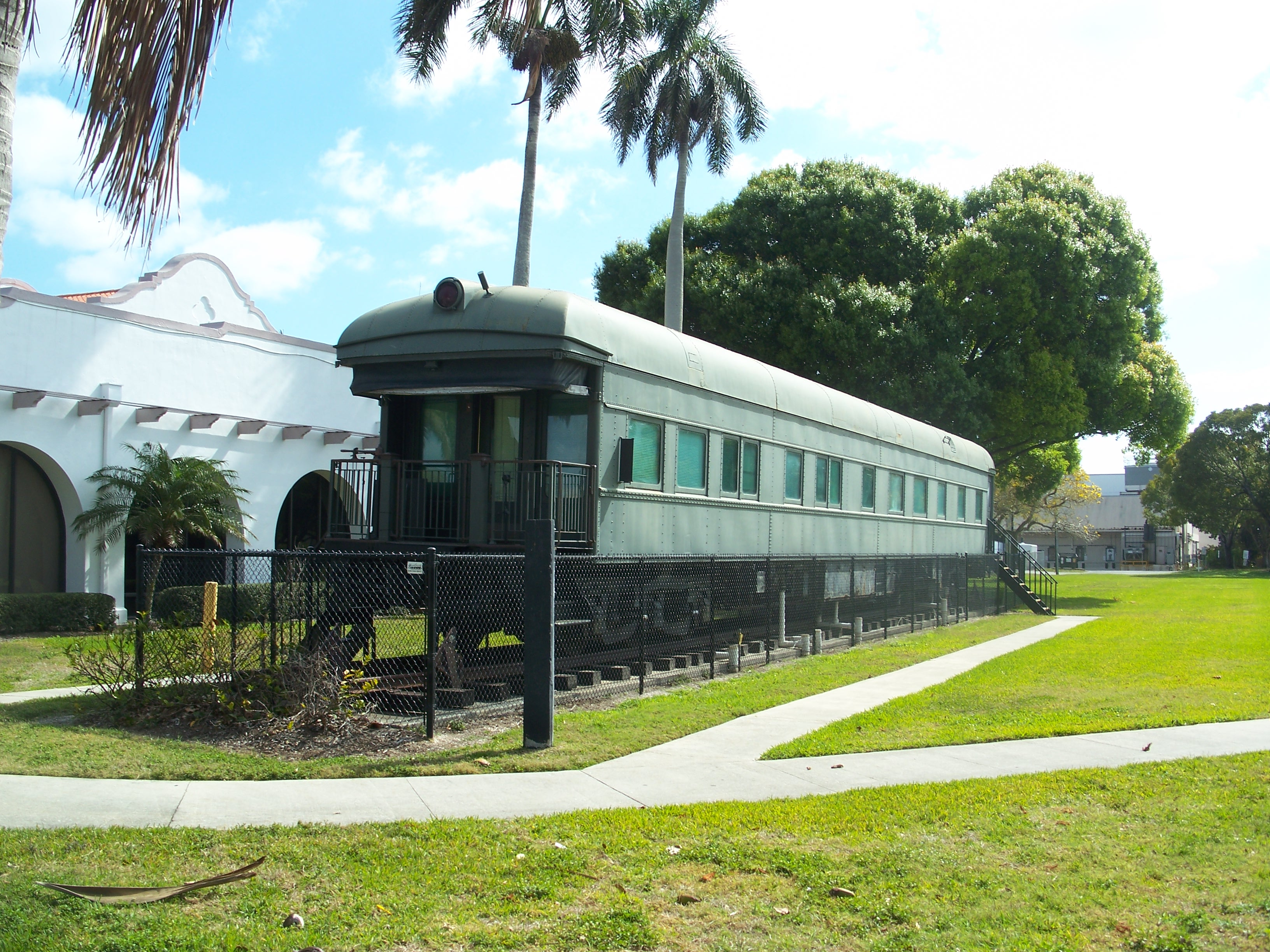
Train car on exhibit

The Southwest Florida Museum of History (SWFLM) is a history museum in Fort Myers, Florida. The museum is in historic downtown Ft. Myers, in a former Atlantic Coast Line Railroad depot at 2031 Jackson Street (one block south of Martin Luther King Jr. Boulevard). It is open Tuesday through Saturday from 10 am to 5 pm.

Exhibits include Paleo Indian artifacts, information on the Calusa and Seminole peoples, and information on Spanish explorers and early settlers, cattlemen, regional military history, agricultural history, and the boating and fishing industries. The collection includes antiques, decorative arts, a pioneer "Florida cracker" house, a 1926 La France fire pumper, and a 1929 private Pullman rail car.
