= Bishop Verot High School =

Bishop Verot Catholic High School
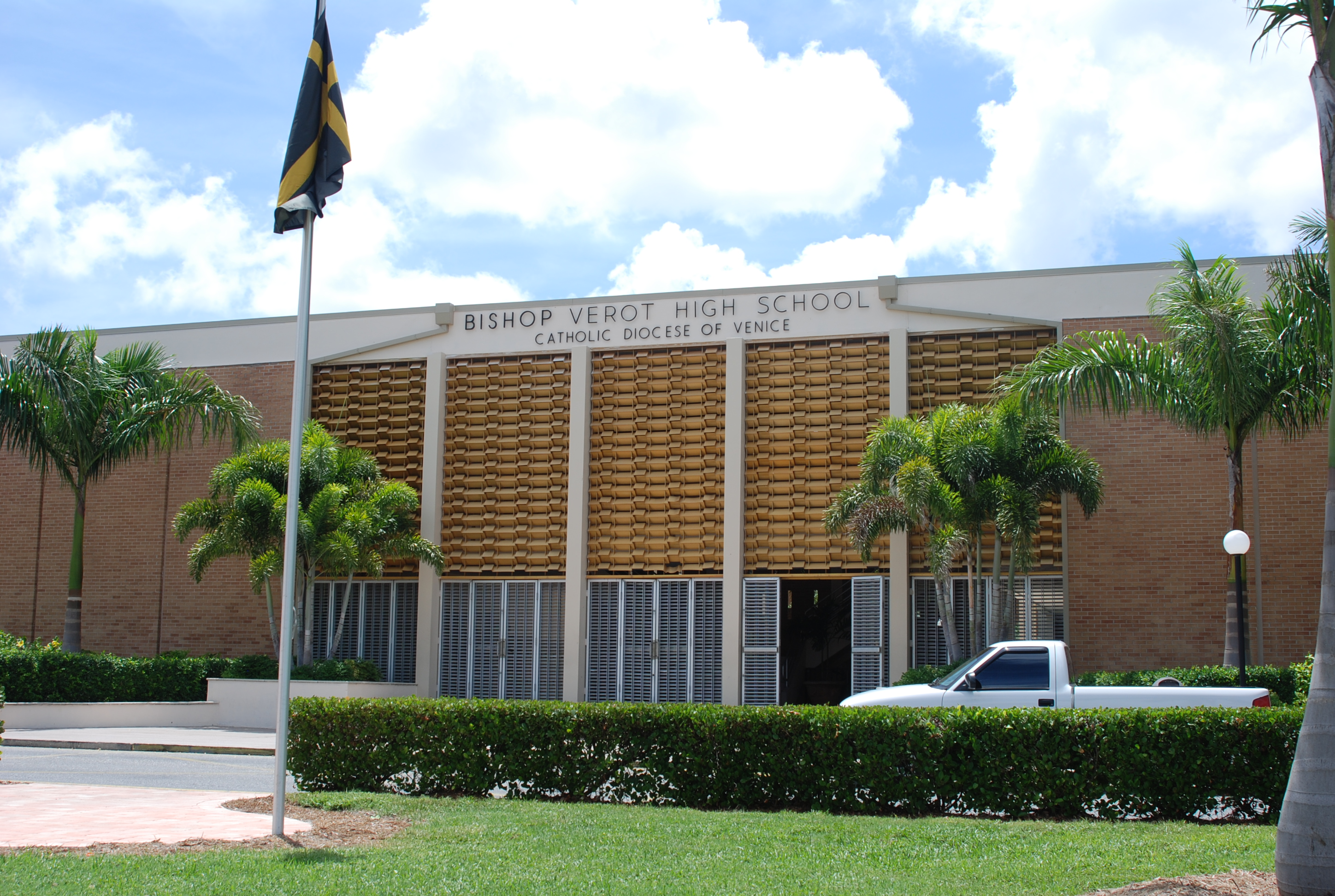

Location
- 5598 Sunrise Drive; Fort Myers, Florida, (Lee County) 33919; 26°35′19″N 81°53′8″W

Information
- Type: Private, Coeducational
- Motto: Non Excidet (May he not fail in his attempt)
- Religious affiliation: Roman Catholic
- Established: 1962
- School code: 100508
- Principal: Suzie O’Grady
- Grades: 9-12
- Colors: Black and gold
- Team name: Vikings
- Accreditation: Southern Association of Colleges and Schools
- Yearbook: Luceat
- Assistant Principal for Administration: Kate Hamstra
- Assistant Principal for Student Affairs: Matt Hiller
- Admissions Director: Patty Holmes
- Athletic Director: Greg Coleman
- Assistant Principal for Curriculum: Christina Miller
- Dean of Students: Christine Mastandrea
- Website: http://www.bvhs.org/

Bishop Verot High School is a private, Roman Catholic high school in Fort Myers, Florida. It is located in the Diocese of Venice, Florida.

== History ==
Bishop Verot Catholic High School was established in 1969 as Fort Myers Central Catholic High School. The school was renamed "Bishop Verot", after Bishop Augustin Vérot, when they moved to their newly-constructed location in 1980. Suzie O’Grady is currently serving as the principal.

== Athletics ==
The school's sports teams are nicknamed the "Vikings." The outdoor teams play on field turf installed in 2005. The indoor teams play in the John J. Nevins Gymnasium, which played host to the City of Palms Classic from 1994 to 2015.

Bishop Verot has claimed seven state championships in its 50-year history: 1984 (volleyball), 1994 (baseball), 2001 (boys' soccer), 2010 (boys' soccer), 2011 (baseball) 2016 (softball) and most recently 2024 (cross country).

== Notable alumni ==
- Blaze Alexander, baseball player
- Dane Eagle, District 77, Florida House of Representatives
- Chad Epperson, manager and coach in the Boston Red Sox organization
- Chris Johnson, third baseman (Houston Astros, Arizona Diamondbacks, Atlanta Braves)
- Seth Petruzelli, competed on The Ultimate Fighter 2, retired professional Mixed Martial Artist
- Adam Piatt, outfielder (Oakland Athletics, Tampa Bay Rays)
- Dan Vogelbach, first baseman (Chicago Cubs, Seattle Mariners, Toronto Blue Jays, Milwaukee Brewers, Pittsburgh Pirates, New York Mets)
