= Ostego Bay Foundation Marine Science Center =

Coordinates: 26.4587°N 81.9531°W

Ostego Bay Foundation Marine Science Center is in Fort Myers, Florida. It is at 718 Fisherman’s Wharf on San Carlos Island between Fort Myers Beach and the mainland. The marine science center includes exhibits and an aquarium. The building is being renovated in 2023 after Hurricane Ian but the foundation's programs are continuing. The annual fish fry fundraiser is scheduled at Bonita Bill's for December 1, 2023.

Founded in 1991, in 2016 the Ostego Bay Foundation celebrated its 25th anniversary. A 2022 fire damaged a room and its library. As of 2023, the building was closed for repairs. It hosts internships and a summer camp. It hosts "Working Waterfront Tours".

Joanne Semmer has been its president. She helped organize the group. It offers a Florida Master Naturalist Program and has an environmental response team trained to assist with oil spills and other situations.

== See also ==
- San Carlos Bay
