= Noah Waddell =

American pianist and professional pickleball player/instructor

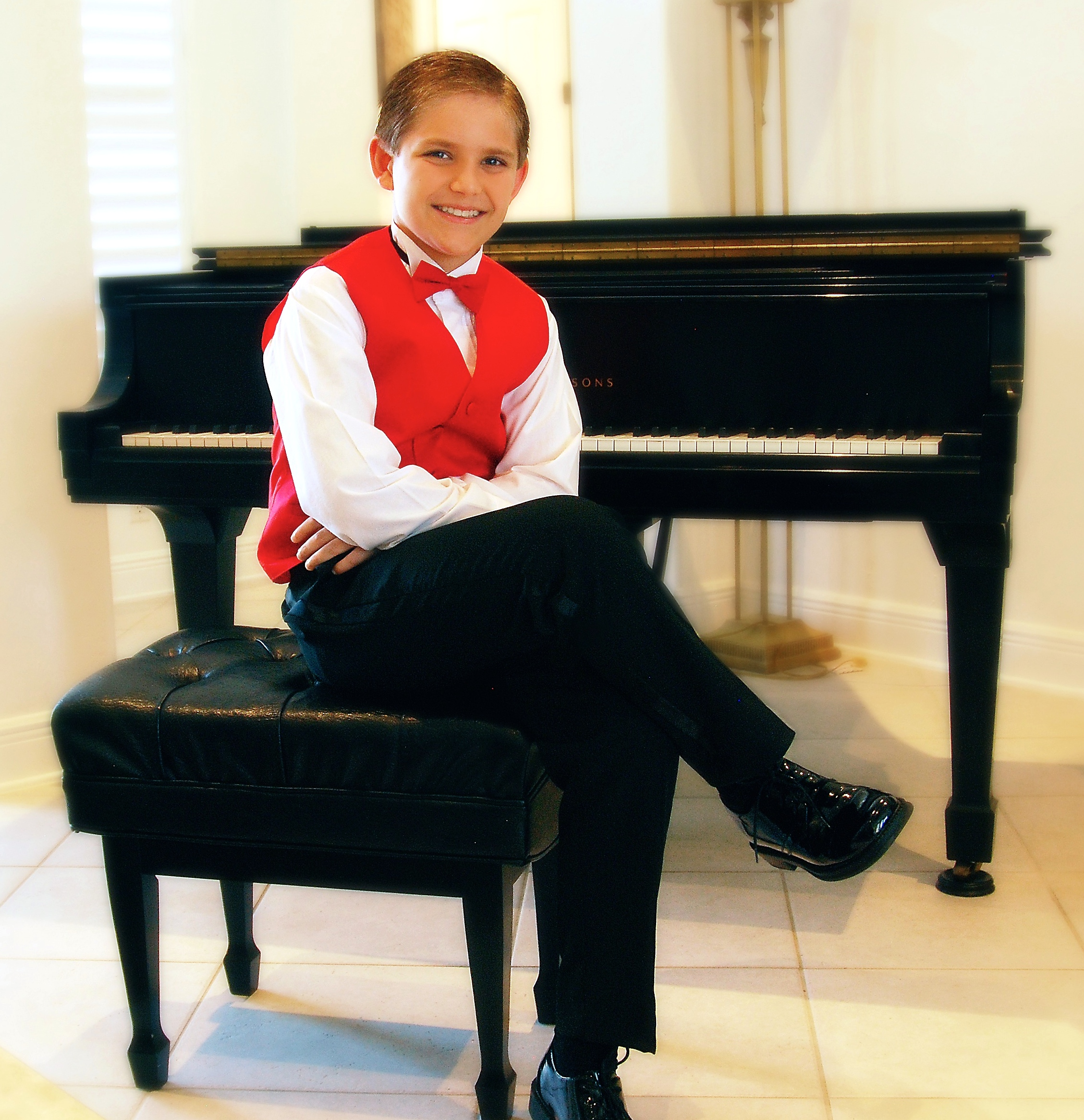
- Born: April 15, 2001 (age 25); Fort Myers, Florida, U.S.
- Occupations: Professional pianist, Professional pickleball
- Style: Classical

Noah Waddell (born April 15, 2001) is an American pianist and professional pickleball player. He first gained national attention as an award-winning 12-year-old pianist playing classical music compositions for patients at a local hospital in Fort Myers, Florida.

== Early life and education ==
Noah Waddell was born on April 15, 2001 in Fort Myers, Florida to Anita Waddell, a former school teacher, and Barry Waddell, a real estate broker and former professional tennis player.

Waddell was homeschooled and, at seven years old, he became interested in piano and began weekly lessons. He also became interested in pickleball around the same time and his father began coaching him.

In 2013, he participated in the annual Florida Federation of Music Clubs competition with over 2,000 competitors, winning their Irene Muir and overall performance awards.He took first place in both solo repertoire and senior concerto competitions, becoming its youngest winner in the competition's history.

In 2014, Waddell was again the overall winner at the event, then took first place in 2015 for his solo performance of a difficult Rachmaninoff piece.

Waddell was one of eight pianists chosen to participate in the Sergei Babayan International Piano Academy at the Cleveland Institute of Music and he attended the Curtis Institute of Music in Philadelphia on a full scholarship for the Summer 2013 semester. He later graduated from Columbus State University in Georgia with a bachelor's degree in piano performance.

== Career ==
Waddell began playing classical music weekly on the grand piano in the atrium at Lee Memorial Hospital in Fort Myers at the age of 12, leading to national attention as a piano prodigy and his making an appearance on the PBS TV Show, "Curious Kids".He was also featured in articles on NBC and on local television.

Waddell made his orchestral debut with the Tampa Bay symphony and has also performed with the Florida Southwest Symphony.

He recorded the album "Piano Masterworks" in 2014.

Waddell's interest in pickleball continued as well and in 2016 he became a professional player on winning the Tampa Bardmoor Pro Challenge.In 2017, he won the US Open Championships Junior Boys Doubles along with doubles partner Joshua Elliott. He is currently a teaching professional, certified by the International Pickleball Teaching Professional Association.

=== Discography ===
- Piano Masterworks by Noah Waddell

== Philanthropy ==
As part of the Arts in Healthcare program, Waddell volunteers his time to play piano at the Fort Myers Health Park Medical Center and other local hospitals on a weekly basis.

In 2013, Waddell hosted Noah's Concert for the Kids at the Big Arts Performance Center on Sanibel Island. The event raised over $30,000 for the new children's hospital at Healthpark.

== Awards ==
Year	Award	Location	Result
2011	FGCU Steinway Young Artist Competition	Naples, FL	First prize
2012	FGCU Steinway Young Artist Competition	Naples, FL	First place
2012	Justin Lebaron Young Artist Competition	St. Petersburg College	First place
2013	Florida Federation of Music Clubs Competition	Northwest Florida State College	Solo repertoire winner; Senior concerto winner; Irene Muir Overall winner
2013	27th Annual Tampa Bay Symphony Concerto Competition	Clearwater, FL	First place
2014	Miami Young Artist Chopin Competition	Miami, FL	First place
2014	Florida Federation of Music Clubs Competition	Jacksonville, FL	Connie Tuttle-Lill All performance winner
2014	International Keyboard Odyssiad Piano Competition	Ft. Collins, Colorado	First place
