= Bishop Nevins Academy =

Catholic school in Florida, United States

Coordinates: 27.336075°N 82.481826°W

- Sarasota, Florida; United States

Information
- Established: 1999

Bishop Nevins Academy is the campus that houses St. Mary Academy and St. Martha Catholic School in Sarasota, Florida. It is named for Bishop Emeritus John J. Nevins. The present facility opened in 1999. The school buildings were designed by architect Rafael Moreu of Moreu & Associates and are two-story monolithic domes with stemwalls. It is located at 4380 Fruitville Road, Sarasota.

It opened with classrooms (i.e. math), a library, a common room (Known as Saint Anne's Hall), restrooms, a chapel, gym, a cafeteria, and a playground, for K-5 during playtime and a playing field for grades 6–8 during playtime (a.k.a. breaktime)/break.

== History ==
Saint Martha's Catholic School opened in 1950 and had its first campus near St. Martha Catholic Church. In the early 1990s, the school felt they needed to move campuses to a new and bigger location, so they selected the present-day location. Funding was secured by parish donations and other benefactors such as Mr. Zazarino. Construction was finished in 1999 when both schools and the campus finally opened. Bishop Nevins Academy houses St. Mary Academy and St. Martha Catholic School, which both are separate schools. St. Mary Academy is a school for special-needs students, while St. Martha's is a private Catholic school. There originally was no gym because the price of steel skyrocketed during construction because of the events of September 11. However, later in 2017, construction ended on the Zazarino Center, which contains a gym and auditorium, as well as containing classrooms and a small conference room. The campus is currently undergoing renovations on their playground due to safety concerns.
