= Peggy Schoolcraft =

American bodybuilder (born 1960)

- professional bodybuilder

Personal info
- Born: March 8, 1960 (age 65); Bayonne, New Jersey, U.S.

Best statistics
- Height: 5 ft 0 in (152 cm)
- Weight: 125 lb (57 kg) (off season) 130 lb (59 kg) (competition)

Professional (Pro) career
- Pro-debut: Jan Tana Classic; 1999
- Best win: Jan Tana Classic, 5th overall; 1999

Margaret "Peggy" Schoolcraft (born March 8, 1960) is a professional female bodybuilder from Ft. Myers, Florida.

== Amateur competition ==
- 1990- Ms. Delaware County- 1st overall.
- 1990- Ms. Southeastern Pennsylvania Regional- 1st overall
- 1990- Lehigh Valley National Qualifier- 1st Lightweight
- 1991- Junior Nationals- 2nd Lightweight, best poser award
- 1992- Junior USA- 1st Lightweight
- 1994- NPC Nationals- 4th Lightweight
- 1995- NPC Nationals- 3rd Middleweight
- 1997- Team Universe- Overall and Lightweight
- 1997- IFBB World Amateur Championships- World champion

== Professional competition ==
- 1999- Jan Tana Classic- 5th overall
- 2001- Ms. International- Top 19th overall
