= Fort Myers Police Department =

Law enforcement agency in Fort Myers, Florida

Fort Myers Police Department (FMPD)
- Abbreviation: FMPD

Jurisdictional structure
- Operations jurisdiction: Fort Myers, Florida, United States
- Map of Fort Myers Police Department's jurisdiction
- Area: 49.04 square miles (127.0 km^{2})
- Population: 86,395

Operational structure
- Headquarters: 2210 Widman Way Fort Myers, FL 33901
- Agency executives: Jason Fields, Chief of Police; Victor Medico, Deputy Chief; Richard Meeks, Deputy Chief

Website
- www.fmpolice.com

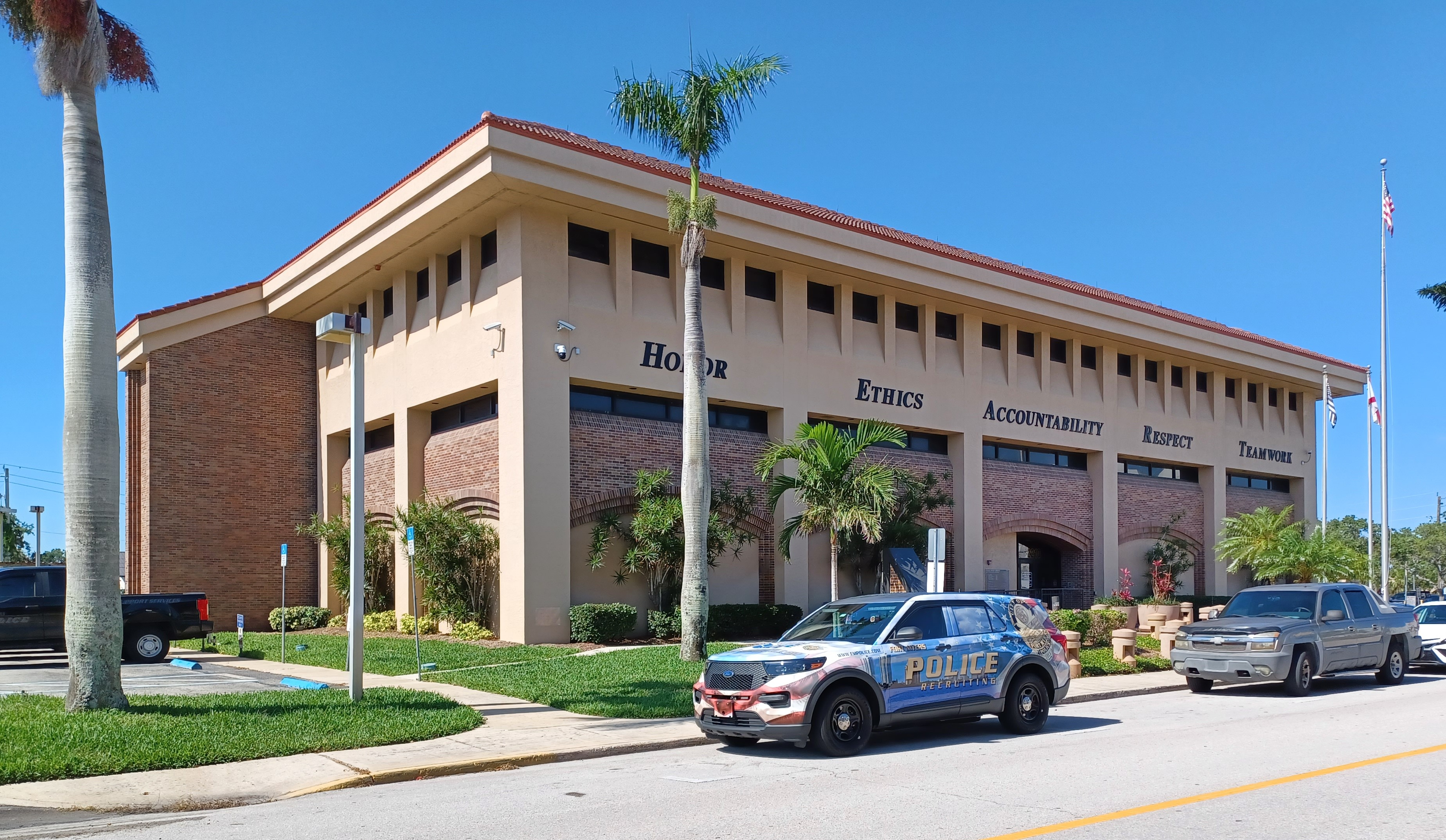
Fort Myers Police Department

The Fort Myers Police Department is the law enforcement agency responsible for primary law enforcement services in the city of Fort Myers, Florida.

== History ==
In 2015, officers from the agency arrested former professional football player Nate Allen. Allen was later released and cleared of any charges. An investigation uncovered evidence that Chief Doug Baker had discrepancies in his reports and statements. Baker was fired and an interim chief was appointed.

In June 2016, after a six-month national search, the city manager named Derrick Diggs as the next chief of police. Diggs, who is retired from the Toledo (OH) Police Department was unanimously approved by the city council.

Following Hurricane Ian's impacts on southwest Florida, the FMPD partnered with Cape Coral Police Department, Medley Police Department, West Miami Police Department, and Coral Gables Police Department to aid in recovery efforts and patrols and lessen the workload on individual officers.

== Equipment ==
The department acquired a MRAP (Mine-Resistant Ambush Protected) vehicle from the U.S. government in 2014. The vehicle, which replaced a surplus V-150, is used by the agency SWAT team.

== Fallen officers ==
The FMPD has lost seven officers and two K-9s in the line of duty since 1930. The first officer to fall in the line of duty was Lieutenant Matthew Hisler, who succumbed to a shotgun blast to the leg on January 3 that he had sustained two days prior when attempting to arrest a man making threats and causing a disturbance.

One officer, Detective Mark Bolhouse suffered a fatal heart attack while inside the Greenwood Police Department headquarters in Greenwood, Indiana. Bolhouse had travelled to Greenwood as part of an investigation into stolen property within Fort Myers.

Three officers and one K-9 have been fatally shot by criminals, three officers have been killed when they were struck by vehicles, and one officer and one K-9 fell to illness or a medical emergency.
