= St. John Neumann High School (Naples, Florida) =

Location
- 3000 53rd Street SW; Naples, (Collier County), Florida 34116; United States; 26°10′20″N 81°42′47″W

Information
- Type: Private, Coeducational
- Religious affiliation: Roman Catholic
- Principal: Sister Patricia Roche, FMA
- Grades: 9–12
- Colors: Green and Gold
- Team name: Celtics
- Accreditation: Southern Association of Colleges and Schools
- Tuition: $13,000
- Dean of Students: Alex Golonka
- Admissions Director: Kathy Sanderson
- Athletic Director: Damon Jones
- Website: https://sjnceltics.org/

St. John Neumann High School (often abbreviated to SJN) is a co-educational private, Roman Catholic high school in Naples, Florida. It is located in the Roman Catholic Diocese of Venice in Florida. The school is named after Saint John Neumann, the fourth bishop of Philadelphia and considered to be a pioneer in Catholic Education, and guided by the educational ethos of Blessed Edmund Rice and the Christian Brothers.

== History ==
St. John Neumann High School was founded in 1980 under the auspices of the Augustinian Fathers. The inaugural freshman class of 27 students were taught in temporary facilities at nearby St. Elizabeth Ann Seton Catholic Church until the school building was completed in the Golden Gate community of Naples. It included twelve class rooms, laboratories, administrative offices, and a gym. Stewardship was later passed to the Congregation of Christian Brothers. Enrollment increased through the 1990s, and due to the challenges of limited space a second wing was added to the school in 1997, which included five new classrooms, a computer lab, a small chapel, a library and media center, and administrative offices. A science center with new biology labs was added in 2009.

== Performance ==
100% graduation rate. Over 98% of graduates have been admitted to college each year.
