= IMAG History & Science Center =

Museum in Fort Myers, Florida, USA

- Former name: Imaginarium Science Center
- Location: 2000 Cranford Avenue; Fort Myers, Florida
- Coordinates: 26.64041°N 81.85938°W
- Type: history and science
- Website: Official website

IMAG History & Science Center (formerly Imaginarium Science Center) is a hands-on science and aquarium museum in Fort Myers, Florida. Exhibits include dinosaurs and fossils, Calusa culture, live native and non-native small animals, aquariums and touch tanks, and interactive displays about science and scientific topics including weather and nanotechnology. The museum offers a summer camp.

The museum was renamed IMAG History & Science Center in March 2017 as a rebranding and reflecting the addition of history at the museum.
