= Murphy-Burroughs House =

Historic house in Florida, United States

- U.S. National Register of Historic Places
- The house in 2019

- Location within Florida Location within the United States
- Interactive map showing the location of Murphy-Burroughs House
- Location: Fort Myers, Florida
- Coordinates: 26°38′49″N 81°51′57″W
- Built: 1901
- Architect: C. S. Caldwell and G. T. Barker
- Architectural style: Georgian Revival
- NRHP reference No.: 84000898
- Added to NRHP: August 1, 1984

The Murphy-Burroughs House, also known as the Burroughs Home and Gardens, is a historic home in Fort Myers, Florida. It is located at 2505 1st Street. On August 1, 1984, it was added to the U.S. National Register of Historic Places.

The Burroughs Home provides living history tours and functions as an event venue. The three-story home sits on the Caloosahatchee. The beautiful veranda wraps around 3 sides of the house. Mona's Dancing Porch extends from the East side of the Historic Structure. Completion of a large, open waterfront pavilion occurred in 2015 to accommodate weddings and events.

The Murphy-Burroughs House was Ft. Myers' first year-round luxury home. It is in the Georgian Revival style and was built in 1901 for John T. Murphy, a cattle rancher. The construction of this home kicked off the "building boom" of the area. Each step of the process was followed by the local newspaper, The Fort Myers Press.

Nelson Burroughs bought the house in 1919. In 1922, Mr. Burroughs transferred ownership of the Home to his daughters, Mona & Jettie. Mona bequeathed the property to The City of Fort Myers prior to her death in 1978. The passing of her husband, Franz Fischer, in 1983, marked the end of its use as a residence.
