= Gummi in Byzacena =

City and bishopric in Roman Africa and Latin Catholic titular see

Africa Proconsularis (125 AD)

Gummi in Byzacena was a city and bishopric in Roman Africa, which remains a Latin Catholic titular see.

== History ==
The city, in modern Tunisia, presumed near modern Henchir-Gelama or Henchir-El-Senem, was important enough in the Roman province Byzacena to become one of the many suffragan sees of the Metropolitan of the provincial capital Hadrumetum (Sousse).

The diocese continued up into the 11th century when pope Leo IX intervened in a struggle for precedence between the local bishop, favoured by the local Zirid rulers, and the archbishop of Carthage.

== Titular see ==
The diocese was nominally restored in 1933 as Titular bishopric of the Episcopal (lowest) rank, under the names of Gummi in Byzacena (Latin), adjective Gummitan(us) in Byzacena (Latin) / Gummi di Bizacena (Curiate Italian)

It has had the following incumbents, of the fitting episcopal rank with an archiepiscopal exception :

- Titular Archbishop: Jean Wolff, Holy Ghost Fathers (C.S.Sp.) (1967.04.13 – 1971.05.24), on emeritate, died 1990; previously Titular Bishop of Phatanus (1941.07.08 – 1955.09.14) as Apostolic Vicar of Majunga (Madagascar) (1941.07.08 – 1947.02.13) and as Apostolic Vicar of Diégo-Suarez (Madagascar) (1947.02.13 – 1955.09.14), promoted with his see first Bishop of Diégo-Suarez (1955.09.14 – 1958.12.11) and again first Metropolitan Archbishop of Diégo-Suarez (1958.12.11 – 1967.04.13)
- Newton Holanda Gurgel (1979.04.10 – 1993.11.24) as Auxiliary Bishop of Crato (Brazil) (1979.04.10 – 1993.11.24); succeeded as Bishop of Crato (1993.11.24 – retired 2001.05.02)
- José Clemente Weber (1994.03.23 – 2004.06.15) as Auxiliary Bishop of Porto Alegre (Brazil) (1994.03.23 – 2004.06.15); later Bishop of Santo Angelo (Brazil) (2004.06.15 – retired 2013.04.24)
- Josafá Menezes da Silva (2005.01.12 – 2010.12.15) as Auxiliary Bishop of São Salvador da Bahia (Brazil) (2005.01.12 – 2010.12.15); later Bishop of Barreiras (Brazil) (2010.12.15 – ...) and Apostolic Administrator of Bom Jesus da Lapa (Brazil) (2014.05.20 – 2015.06.24)
- Dagoberto Sosa Arriaga (2011.02.24 – 2013.02.23) as Auxiliary Bishop of Puebla de los Ángeles (Mexico) (2011.02.24 – 2013.02.23); later Bishop of Tlapa (Mexico) (2013.02.23 – ...)
- Alphonse Nguyễn Hữu Long, Sulpicians (P.S.S.) (2013.06.15 – 2018.12.22), as Auxiliary Bishop of Hung Hoá (Vietnam); succeeded as Bishop of Vinh (2018.12.22 –...)
- Gregg M. Caggianelli, (2013.05.09 - Present) as Auxiliary Bishop of the Archdiocese for the Military Services, USA

== See also ==
- Gummi in Proconsulari, another titular see in present Tunisia's other Roman province

== Sources and external links ==
- GCatholic
