= Diocese of Venice in Florida =

Latin Catholic ecclesiastical jurisdiction in Florida, USA

Coordinates: 27°06′N 82°26′W

Diocese of Venice in Florida Dioecesis Venetiae in Florida
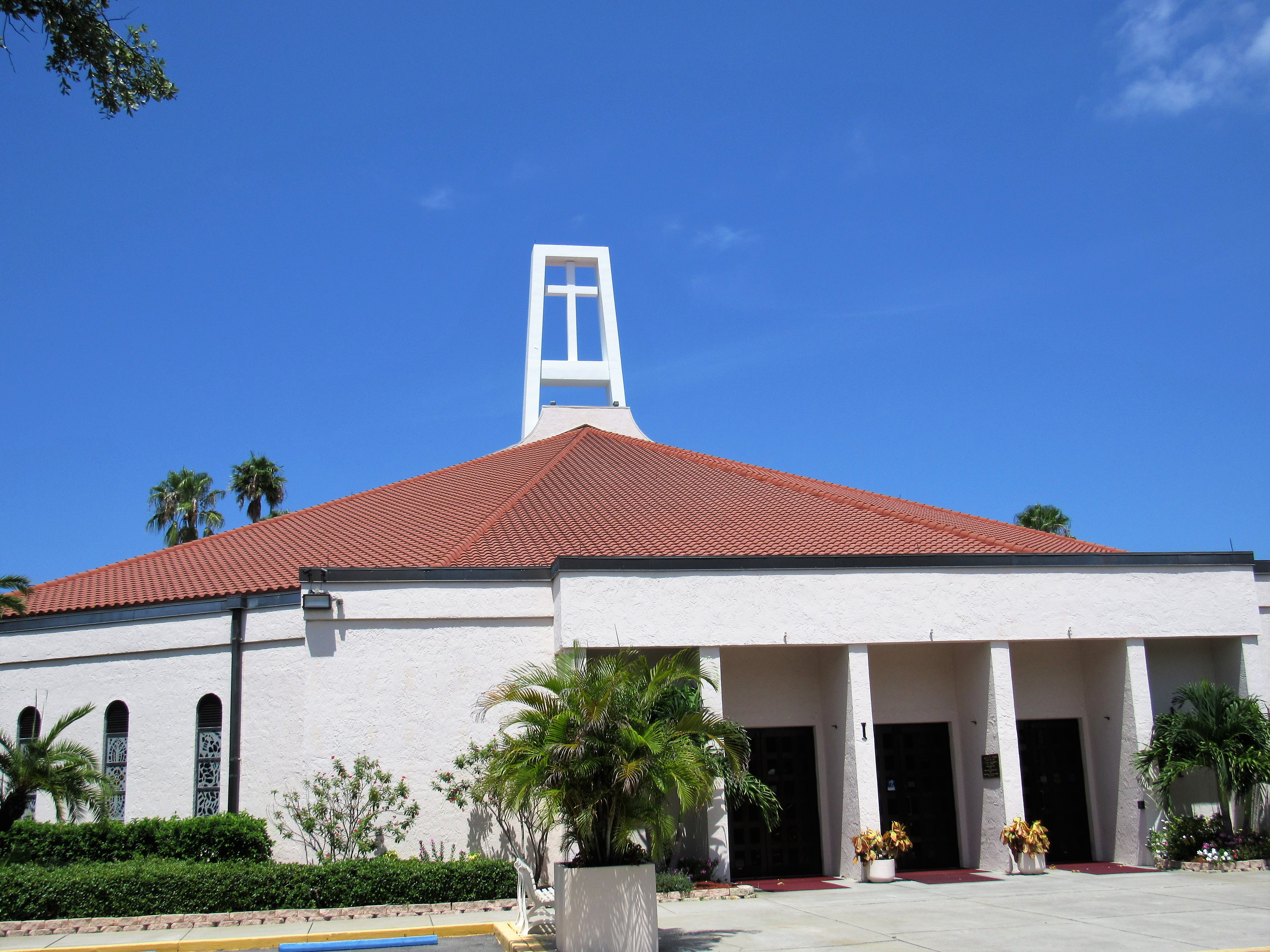
- Epiphany Cathedral

- Coat of arms

Location
- Country: United States
- Territory: The counties of Charlotte, Collier, DeSoto, Glades, Hardee, Hendry, Highlands, Lee, Manatee, and Sarasota
- Ecclesiastical province: Province of Miami

Statistics
- Area: 22,685 km^{2} (8,759 sq mi)
- Population: Total; Catholics: (as of 2023); 2,444,235; 242,156 (9.9%)
- Parishes: 61

Information
- Denomination: Catholic
- Sui iuris church: Latin Church
- Rite: Roman Rite
- Established: June 16, 1984
- Cathedral: Epiphany Cathedral
- Patron saint: Our Lady of Mercy; St. Mark the Evangelist

Current leadership
- Pope: Leo XIV
- Bishop: Emilio Biosca Agüero
- Metropolitan Archbishop: Thomas Wenski
- Vicar General: Father David M. Vidal
- Judicial Vicar: Father Robert Dziedziak

Map
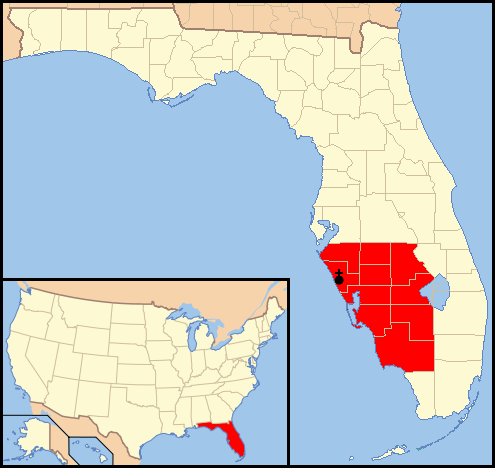

Website
- dioceseofvenice.org

The Diocese of Venice in Florida (Latin: Dioecesis Venetiae in Florida) is a diocese of the Catholic Church in southwest Florida in the United States, founded in 1984. It is a suffragan diocese of the metropolitan Archdiocese of Miami.

== Territory ==
The Diocese of Venice includes ten counties on the west coast of southern Florida.

== History ==
=== Background ===
==== Early expeditions ====
The first Catholic presence in southwest Florida was the expedition of the Spaniard Juan Ponce de León, who arrived on the Gulf Coast in 1513. Hostility from the native Calusa people prevented him from landing. De Leon returned to the region with a colonizing expedition in 1521, landing near either Charlotte Harbor or the mouth of the Caloosahatchee River. His expedition included 200 men, and several priests were among them.

In 1539, Spanish explorer Hernando De Soto landed near present day Port Charlotte or San Carlos Bay. He named the new territory "La Bahia de Espiritu Santo," in honor of the Holy Spirit. DeSoto led an expedition of 10 ships and 620 men. His company included 12 priests. The De Soto expedition later proceeded to the Tampa Bay area and then into central Florida.

The Spanish missionary Luis de Cáncer arrived by sea with several Dominican priests in present-day Bradenton in 1549. Encountering a seemingly peaceful party of Tocobaga clan members, they decided to travel on to Tampa Bay. Several of the priests went overland with the Tocobaga while Cáncer and the rest of the party sailed to Tampa Bay to meet them. Arriving at Tampa Bay, Cáncer learned, while still on his ship, that the Tocobaga had murdered the priests in the overland party. Ignoring advice to leave the area, Cáncer went ashore, where he too was murdered. The Spanish attempted to establish another mission in the Tampa Bay area in 1567, but it was soon abandoned.

In 1565, the Spanish explorer Pedro Menéndez de Avilés, the founder of Saint Augustine and Governor of Spanish Florida, brokered a peace agreement with the Calusa peoples. This agreement allowed him to build the San Antón de Carlos mission at Mound Key in what is now Lee County. Menéndez de Avilés also built a fort at Mound Key and established a garrison. San Antón de Carlos was the first Jesuit mission in the Western Hemisphere and the first Catholic presence within the Venice area. Juan Rogel and Francisco de Villareal spent the winter at the mission studying the Calusa language, then started evangelizing among the Calusa in southern Florida. The Jesuits built a chapel at the mission in 1567. Conflicts with the Calusa soon increased, prompting Menéndez de Avilés to abandon San Antón de Carlos in 1569.

==== Further development ====
After the end of the French and Indian War in 1763, Spain ceded all of Florida to Great Britain for the return of Cuba. Given the antagonism of Protestant Great Britain to Catholicism, the majority of the Catholic population in Florida fled to Cuba. After the American Revolution, Spain regained control of Florida in 1784. In 1793, the Vatican changed the jurisdiction for Florida Catholics from the Diocese of Havana (erected in 1787 from the Diocese of Santiago de Cuba) to the Diocese of Louisiana and the Two Floridas, based in New Orleans. After of the Louisiana purchase (1803), Florida returned in 1806 to the Diocese of Havana (until 1823). In the Adams–Onís Treaty of 1819, Spain ceded all of Florida to the United States, which established the Florida Territory in 1821.

In 1825, the Apostolic Vicariate of Alabama and Florida was erected; it included all of Florida, based in Mobile, Alabama.In 1858, Pius IX moved Florida into a new Apostolic Vicariate of Florida, which in 1870 was converted into the Diocese of St. Augustine, which included the Venice area.

After the end of the American Civil War in 1865, Catholic missionaries from dioceses in Savannah, St. Augustine, and Tampa, began visiting the Venice area. In 1889, the Venice area was placed under the jurisdiction of the Jesuit Order in Tampa, with Bishop John Moore requesting that the Jesuits cover Hillsborough County southward to Key West. Jesuit priests made regular visits to Bradenton, Fort Myers, Arcadia, and adjacent missions. The first missions established by Jesuits in southwest Florida were:

- Sacred Heart in Bradenton (1868)
- Immaculate Conception of the Blessed Virgin Mary (later St. Francis Xavier) in Fort Myers (1878)
- St. Paul in Arcadia (1882)
- Sacred Heart in Punta Gorda (1888)
- St. Martha in Sarasota (1889)

In the early years of the 20th Century, the following parishes were established in the Venice area:

- St. Michael in Wauchula (1915)
- St. Joseph in Bradenton (1915)
- St. Catherine in Sebring (1918)

Epiphany Parish, the first in Venice, was established as a mission in 1935.

After the end of World War II in 1945, Bishop Joseph P. Hurley of St. Augustine started a program of purchasing property throughout Florida to develop new parishes for the increasing Catholic population. He also recruited priests from the northern states and Ireland. St. Ann's, the first parish in Naples, opened in 1950.

=== Establishment ===
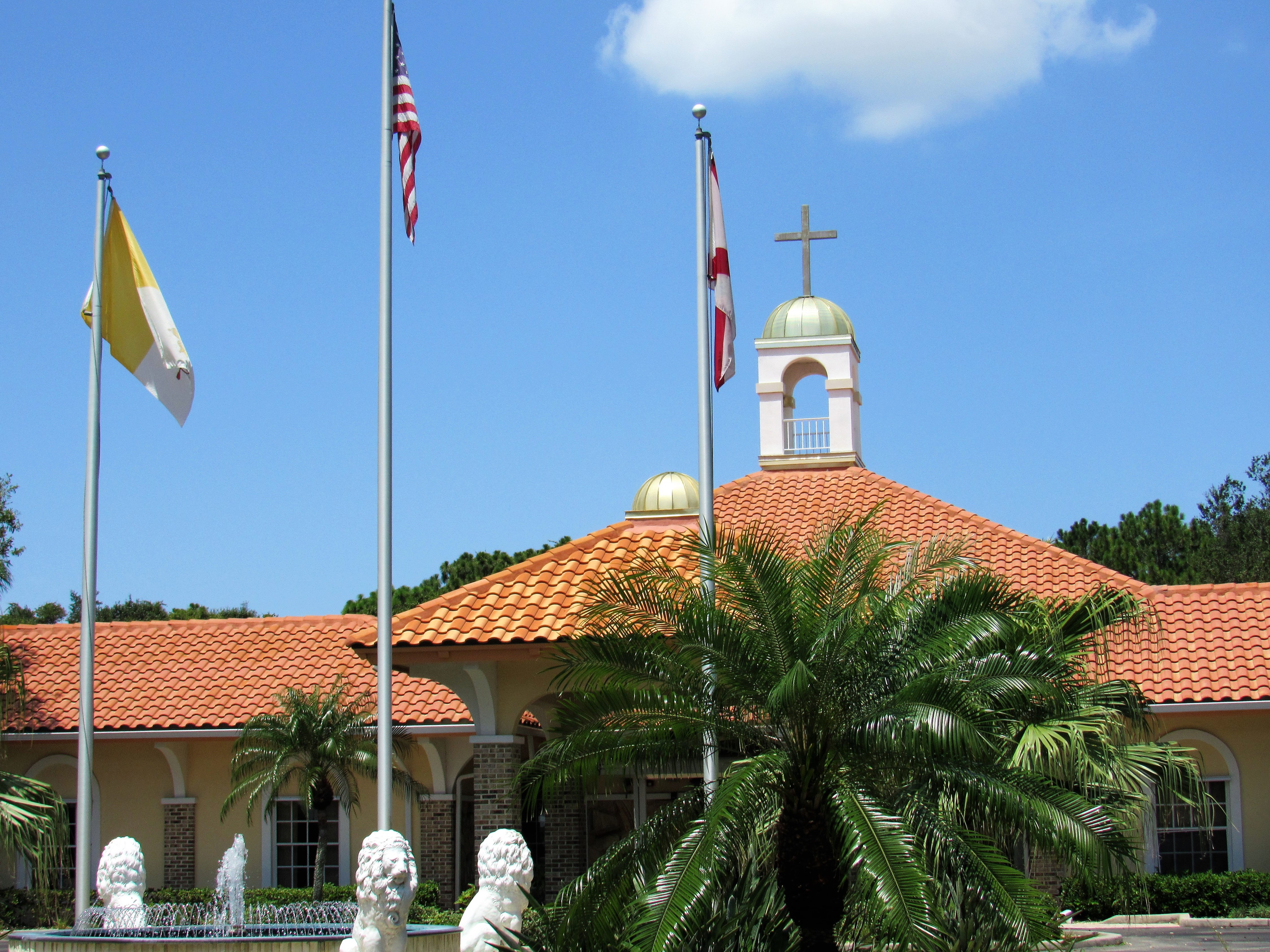
Catholic Center, Venice, Florida (2017)

The Diocese of Venice in Florida was erected by Pope John Paul II in 1984 from parts of the Archdiocese of Miami and the Dioceses of Orlando, and St. Petersburg; John J. Nevins, Auxiliary Bishop of the Archdiocese of Miami, was the founding bishop.

Nevins built a memorial to the eucharist and a memorial cross in 1994 at De Soto National Memorial in Bradenton. This was to honor the priests from the Cáncer expedition who were killed there in 1549. In 2006, Frank Dewane was appointed as coadjutor bishop.

=== Sex abuse ===
Charles Cikovic pleaded guilty in 1993 to sexual battery on a child and of lewd and lascivious assault on a child. The priest's victim was a 13-year-old girl whom he abused in 1992 and early 1993. Cikovic was sentenced to six months in prison and 20 years of probation. The girl's family sued the diocese in February 1994; the diocese settled the lawsuit three years later.

In November 2005, a St. Petersburg man filed a lawsuit against Nevins and the diocese, claiming that he was sexually abused as a minor by George E. Brennan. The plaintiff claimed to have been sodomized in 1984 four times at Incarnation Catholic Church in Sarasota. The suit said that Nevins covered up the alleged crime. Brennan had been arrested in 1991 during a police sting operation against prostitution after exposing himself to an undercover officer. He pleaded no contest to the charge.

The diocese settled a lawsuit with a Fort Myers man in 2014 regarding Jean Joseph from Holmes Beach. The plaintiff claimed that Joseph sexually abused him in the 1990s. Joseph was ultimately removed from his posting and laicized.

Robert Little, a lay minister at St. Francis Xavier Parish in Fort Myers, was arrested in January 2014 on felony charges of lewd or lascivious behavior on a victim between ages 12 and 16. The victim was a special needs 13-year-old whom Little sexually abused several times. In a plea agreement, Little was sentenced to three days in jail and ten years probation.

== Bishops ==
=== Bishops of Venice ===
1. John Joseph Nevins (1984–2007)
2. Frank Dewane (2007–2026), coadjutor bishop (2006–2007)
3. Emilio Biosca Agüero OFM Cap (2026–present)

=== Other priests of the diocese who became bishops ===
- Gregg M. Caggianelli appointed Auxiliary Bishop for the Military Services in 2025

== Education ==
=== High schools ===
- Bishop Verot High School – Fort Myers
- Cardinal Mooney High School – Sarasota
- St. John Neumann High School – Naples
- Rhodora J. Donahue Academy – Ave Maria
- Institute for Catholic Studies and Formation – Peace River
