= Cypress Lake High School =

Public high school in Cypress Lake, Florida

Cypress Lake High School Center for the Arts

Location
- 6750 Panther Lane; Fort Meyers, Florida 33919; United States; 26.542°N 81.902°W

Information
- School type: Public, Secondary magnet
- Opened: 1963
- School district: Lee County
- NCES District ID: 1201080
- Superintendent: Nancy Graham, Ed.D.
- NCES School ID: 120108001150
- Principal: Angela Roles
- Teaching staff: 63.77 (FTE)
- Grades: 9–12
- Gender: Coed
- Enrollment: 1,429 (2024–2025)
- Student to teacher ratio: 22.41
- Campus type: Suburban
- Colors: Purple and White
- Mascot: Spartans
- Team name: Cy lakes Spartans
- Publication: The Cypress Chronicles
- Yearbook: Cypressonian
- Website: http://cyh.leeschools.net

Cypress Lake High School Center for the Arts is a secondary school located in Cypress Lake, Florida. Cypress Lake High School is a high school in the South Zone specializing in five arts programs: Music, Dance, Media, Theatre, and Visual arts.

Cypress Lake has AP programs and an extensive ESOL program.

== Center for the Arts ==
Cypress Lake High School's secondary campus, the Center for Arts, was established in 1994 and is exclusively for students with a concentration in one of the arts programs; it is located north of the main campus and consists of five distinct departments. In the past, Cypress Lake High School and Cypress Lake Center for the Arts were separate institutions and therefore had separate sets of administration and staff. Students attending Cypress Lake Center for the Arts would take their academic classes at Cypress Lake High School. Today, they are one coherent school, with the same staff and administration.

== Notable alumni ==
- De'Vondre Campbell, professional football player for the San Francisco 49ers.
- Charles Ghigna, poet and children's author known as "Father Goose;" taught English at Cypress Lake High School, 1967–1973.
- Jan Hooks, Class of 1975, Actress and Cast Member Saturday Night Live.
- Rhyleigh Plank, singer and vocalist who gained national recognition performing on The Voice.
- Vonzell Solomon, 3rd-place winner on season 4 of American Idol.
