= Emilio Biosca Agüero =

American Catholic prelate (born 1964)

His Excellency, The Most Reverend Emilio Biosca Agüero OFM Cap
- Bishop of Venice in Florida
- Diocese: Venice in Florida
- Appointed: May 13, 2026
- Installed: July 11, 2026
- Predecessor: Frank Joseph Dewane

Orders
- Ordination: May 21, 1994 by Seán Patrick O'Malley
- Consecration: July 11, 2026 by Thomas Wenski, Seán Patrick O'Malley, and Frank Joseph Dewane

Personal details
- Born: December 15, 1964 (age 61) Colorado Springs, Colorado
- Education: Borromeo College; Oblate College; John Paul II Institute (S.T.L.)
- Motto: Ite ad Joseph (Latin for 'Go to Joseph')
- Styles
- Reference style: His Excellency; The Most Reverend
- Spoken style: Your Excellency
- Religious style: Bishop

Emilio Biosca Agüero (born December 15, 1964) is an American Catholic prelate and Capuchin friar serving as Bishop of Venice in Florida since 2026.

== Biography ==
Biosca was born on December 15, 1964, to Cuban immigrant parents in Colorado Springs, Colorado.

On May 21, 1994, Biosca was ordained by Bishop Seán Patrick O'Malley to the priesthood for the Order of Friars Minor Capuchin at the Shrine of the Sacred Heart in Washington, D.C..

Biosca served as a missionary in Papua New Guinea for 12 years, before taking several assignments in Cuba between 2007 and 2019, including in Havana, Santa Clara, and Manzanillo.

Following his time as a missionary, he served as pastor of the Shrine of the Sacred Heart in Washington, where he spoke out in opposition to the Trump administration's immigration policies, which he said negatively impacted his parishioners.

Biosca speaks English, Spanish, and Tok Pisin.

== Episcopal career ==
=== Diocese of Venice in Florida ===
Pope Leo XIV appointed Biosca Agüero bishop for the Diocese of Venice in Florida on May 13, 2026. On July 11, 2026, Biosca Agüero was consecrated and ordained as a bishop. His consecration took place at St. John XXIII Parish in Fort Myers due to the ongoing reconstruction of the cathedral.

== See also ==
- Catholic Church hierarchy
- Catholic Church in the United States
- Historical list of the Catholic bishops of the United States
- List of Catholic bishops of the United States
- Lists of patriarchs, archbishops, and bishops

Catholic Church titles
Preceded by Frank Joseph Dewane	Bishop of Venice in Florida; 2026-Present	Succeeded by Incumbent
