= Frank Dewane =

American Catholic prelate (1950–2026)

The Most Reverend Frank Dewane
- Bishop of Venice in Florida
- Diocese: Venice in Florida
- Appointed: April 25, 2006 (Coadjutor)
- Installed: January 19, 2007
- Retired: May 13, 2026
- Predecessor: John Joseph Nevins
- Successor: Emilio Biosca Agüero
- Previous post: Undersecretary, Pontifical Council for Justice and Peace (2001–2006)

Orders
- Ordination: July 16, 1988 by Adam Maida
- Consecration: July 25, 2006 by John Joseph Nevins, John Favalora, Diarmuid Martin

Personal details
- Born: March 9, 1950 Green Bay, Wisconsin, U.S.
- Died: October 7, 2026 (aged 76) Sarasota, Florida, U.S.
- Education: University of Wisconsin–Oshkosh; American University; University of Notre Dame; Pontifical University of Saint Thomas Aquinas
- Motto: Iustitia pax gaudium (Latin for 'Justice, peace, joy')
- Styles
- Reference style: His Excellency; The Most Reverend
- Spoken style: Your Excellency
- Religious style: Bishop

Frank Joseph Dewane (March 9, 1950 – October 7, 2026) was an American Catholic prelate who served as Bishop of Venice in Florida from 2007 to 2026.

== Life and career ==
=== Early life and education ===
Dewane was born in Green Bay, Wisconsin, on March 9, 1950. He was the third of the four children of Ben and Eleanor Dewane, who owned and operated a dairy farm. Dewane attended Denmark High School in Denmark, Wisconsin, where he played lineman on the football team. During his summer vacations, he worked at an appliance factory to pay for college.

He studied at the University of Wisconsin–Oshkosh in Oshkosh, Wisconsin, from 1968 to 1972, obtaining a bachelor's degree. He then attended American University in Washington, D.C., from 1973 to 1975, earning a Master of International Administration degree. After his graduation in 1975 from American University, Dewane worked for the National Broadcasting Company (NBC) in Moscow in what was then the Soviet Union. He later worked for a subsidiary of PepsiCo in New York City.

Dewane studied philosophy at the University of Notre Dame in Notre Dame, Indiana, from 1983 to 1984, then traveled to Rome in 1984 to attend the Pontifical North American College. He studied theology at the Pontifical Gregorian University and canon law at the Pontifical University of Saint Thomas Aquinas, both in Rome.

=== Priestly ministry ===
Dewane was ordained to the priesthood at Saint Francis Xavier Cathedral in Green Bay for the Diocese of Green Bay by Future Cardinal Adam Maida on July 16, 1988.After his 1988 ordination, the diocese assigned Dewane as assistant pastor at Ss. Peter and Paul Parish in Green Bay, Wisconsin, until 1991. He worked for the diocesan tribunal as well.

In 1991, the Vatican named Dewane to its Permanent Observer Mission to the United Nations in New York City. Dewane went to Rome in 1995 to become an official of the Pontifical Council Cor Unum. From 2001 to 2006, Dewane served as undersecretary of the Pontifical Council for Justice and Peace in Rome. During his tenure as undersecretary, he acted as a Vatican diplomat to numerous international conferences and other events.

== Episcopal ministry ==
On April 25, 2006, Dewane was appointed as coadjutor bishop of Venice in Florida by Pope Benedict XVI to assist Bishop John Nevins. Dewayne was consecrated on July 25, 2006, by Nevins, with John Favalora and Diarmuid Martin as co-consecrators, at Epiphany Cathedral in Venice. He took as his episcopal motto: Iustitia Pax Gaudium, meaning, "Justice, Peace, and Joy" (Romans 14:17).

When Nevins retired on January 19, 2007, Dewane automatically succeeded him as bishop of Venice.

In June 2014, a group of ten priests from the diocese sent a complaint letter about Dewane to Archbishop Carlo Maria Viganò, the papal nuncio for the United States. The priests charged Dewane with ignoring canon law, refusing to consult with priests, and creating an atmosphere of intimidation within the diocese. Dewane termed the allegations as "malicious" and "unfounded".

Dewane, in April 2019, ordered Christopher Senk, the former pastor of St. Isabel Parish in Sanibel, Florida, to spend a year in penance and prayer. After a two-year investigation, the Congregation for Clergy in Rome had determined that Senk had improperly accepted thousands of dollars in gifts from Marion McIntyre. Her family claimed that McIntyre suffered from dementia during that period. Senk was suspended from pastoral ministry when the investigation began.

On May 13, 2026, Pope Leo XIV accepted his retirement after reaching the customary retirement age of 75.

== Death ==
Dewane died at a hospital in Sarasota, Florida, on October 7, 2026. He was 76.

== See also ==
- Catholic Church hierarchy
- Catholic Church in the United States
- Historical list of the Catholic bishops of the United States
- List of Catholic bishops of the United States
- Lists of patriarchs, archbishops, and bishops

Catholic Church titles
Preceded by John Joseph Nevins	Bishop of Venice in Florida; 2007–2026	Succeeded by Emilio Biosca Agüero
Preceded by Giampaolo Crepaldi	Undersecretary of the Pontifical Council for Justice and Peace; 2001–2006	Succeeded by Flaminia Giovanelli
