= John Joseph Nevins =

American Catholic bishop (1932–2014)

His Excellency, The Most Reverend John Nevins
- Bishop of Venice in Florida; Titular Bishop of Rusticiana
- Church: Catholic Church
- See: Roman Catholic Diocese of Venice in Florida
- Appointed: July 17, 1984
- Installed: October 25, 1984
- Term ended: January 19, 2007
- Predecessor: Diocese Erected
- Successor: Frank Joseph Dewane
- Previous posts: Auxiliary Bishop of Miami; 1979 to 1984

Orders
- Ordination: May 23, 1959 by John Michael McNamara
- Consecration: March 24, 1979 by Edward A. McCarthy

Personal details
- Born: January 19, 1932 New Rochelle, New York, US
- Died: August 26, 2014 (aged 82) Venice, Florida, US
- Education: Tulane University; Catholic University of America
- Motto: To serve with mercy

John Joseph Nevins (January 19, 1932 – August 26, 2014) was an American prelate of the Catholic Church. He served as an auxiliary bishop of the Archdiocese of Miami in Florida from 1979 to 1984 and as the first bishop of the new Diocese of Venice in Florida from 1984 until 2007.

== Biography ==
=== Early life ===
John Nevins was born on January 19, 1932, in New Rochelle, New York. He received an early education from the Irish Christian Brothers, but was forced to transfer to a seminary for the Fathers of Mercy when the Irish Brothers disbanded. Nevins received a master's degree at Tulane University in New Orleans, then attended Catholic University of America in Washington, D.C.

=== Priesthood ===
Nevins was ordained a priest at the National Shire of the Immaculate Conception in Washington, D.C. for the Archdiocese of Miami by Bishop John Michael McNamara on June 6, 1959 when he was 27 years old.

=== Auxiliary Bishop of Miami ===
On January 25, 1979, Nevins was appointed by Pope John Paul II as auxiliary bishop of Miami and as titular bishop of Rusticiana. He was consecrated at the Miami Beach Convention Hall in Miami Beach, Florida, on March 24, 1979 by Archbishop Edward A. McCarthy, Bishop René Gracida, and Bishop John Fitzpatrick.

=== Bishop of Venice in Florida ===
On July 17, 1984, Nevins was appointed by John Paul II as the first bishop of the Diocese of Venice in Florida. Nevins was a member of the Order of the Holy Sepulchre. In 1992, he sponsored a special collection to help Croatians and Bosnians who were suffering from the Bosnian War in Bosnia and Herzegovina.

In August 2003, three Florida siblings sued the diocese and Nevins, alleging sexual molestation by Reverend William Romero, a former priest. Between 1979 and 1982, while in a sexual relationship with their mother, Romero sexually abused the three siblings in Hobe Sound, Florida. In November 2005, a St. Petersburg, Florida, man filed a lawsuit against Nevins and the diocese, claiming that he was sexually abused as a minor by Reverend George E. Brennan, a diocesan priest. The plaintiff claimed to have been sodomized in 1984 four times at Incarnation Catholic Church in Sarasota, Florida. The suit claimed that Nevins had covered up the alleged crime.

=== Retirement and death ===
Pope Benedict XVI accepted Nevin's resignation as bishop of Venice in Florida on January 19, 2007. John Nevins died in Venice on August 26, 2014. The Bishop Nevins Academy in Sarasota, Florida, was named after him.

== Viewpoints ==
=== Gambling ===
Nevins opposed efforts in 1994 to amend the Florida State Constitution to allow casinos and riverboat gambling, concerned about the potential side effects on people who gambled.

=== Abortion ===
In a 1992 pastoral letter, "Reverence for God and the Human Person," Nevins condemned abortion rights for women Although Americans "live in a pluralistic society," he said, there are not two standards of morality -- there is only one."

Catholic Church titles
Preceded by Diocese Erected	Bishop of Venice in Florida; 1984–2007	Succeeded by Frank Joseph Dewane
Preceded by –	Auxiliary Bishop of Miami; 1979–1984	Succeeded by –
