= Fort Myers, Florida =

- City
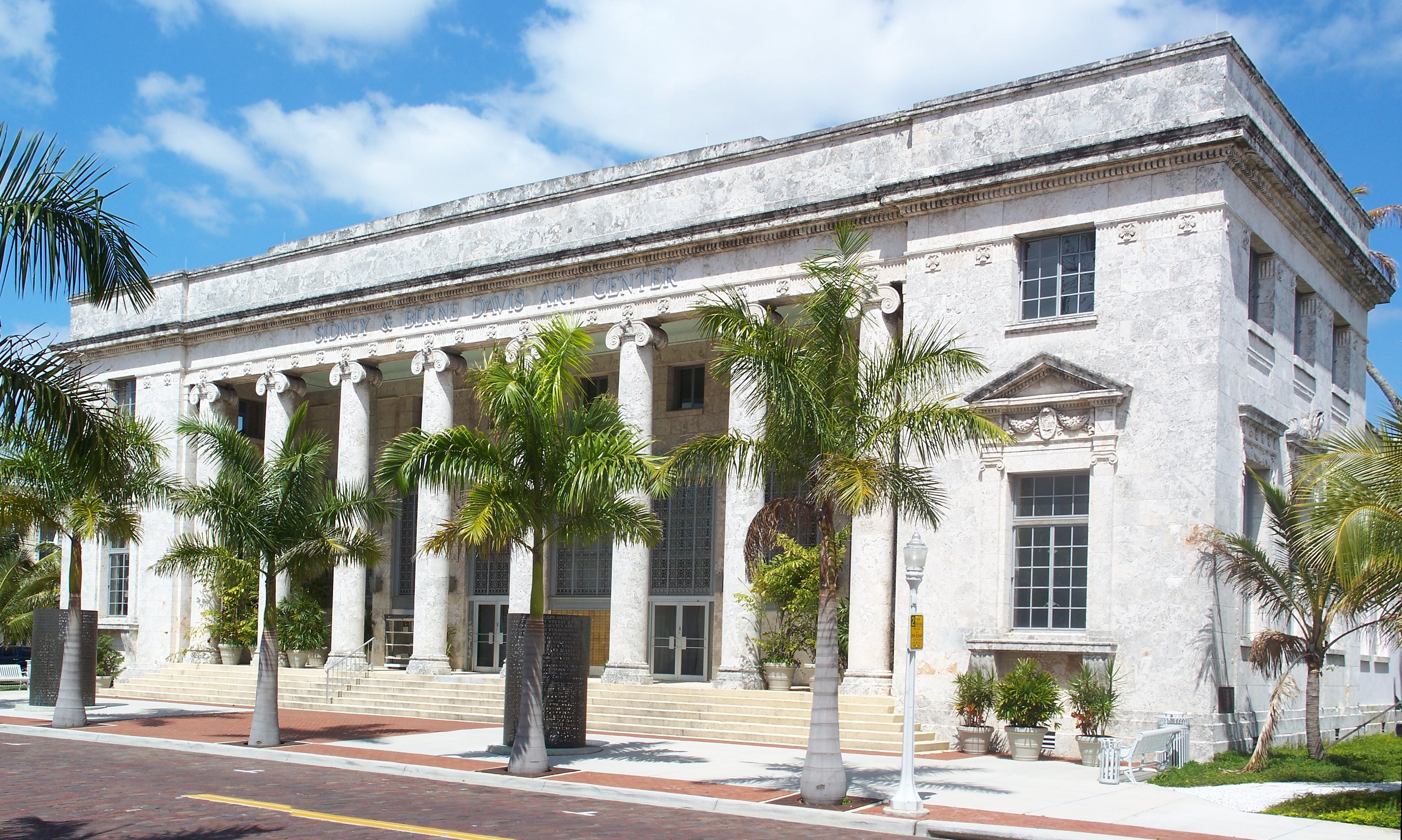
- Sidney and Berne Davis Art Museum in downtown Fort Myers

- Seal Coat of arms
- Motto: "City of Palms"
- Interactive map of Fort Myers, Florida
- Location within Florida Location within the United States
- Coordinates: 26°37′24″N 81°51′20″W
- Country: United States
- State: Florida
- County: Lee
- Founded: March 24, 1885; 141 years ago
- Incorporated: August 12, 1885; 141 years ago

Government
  - Type: Council–Manager

Area
  - Total: 49.03 sq mi (127.00 km^{2})
  - Land: 39.84 sq mi (103.19 km^{2})
  - Water: 9.19 sq mi (23.81 km^{2})
- Elevation: 10 ft (3.0 m)

Population (2020)
  - Total: 86,395
  - Estimate (2025): 101,581
  - Rank: 339th
  - Density: 2,168.4/sq mi (837.24/km^{2})
- Time zone: UTC−5 (Eastern (EST))
  - Summer (DST): UTC−4 (EDT)
- ZIP Codes: 33901-33903, 33905-33908, 33912-33913, 33916-33919, 33965-33967, 33993-33994
- Area code: 239
- FIPS code: 12-24125
- GNIS feature ID: 2403643
- Website: www.fortmyers.gov

Fort Myers (or Ft. Myers) is a city in and the county seat of Lee County, Florida, United States. As of the 2020 census, the population was 86,395; it was estimated to have grown to 101,581 in 2025, making it the 25th-most populous city in Florida. Together with the larger and more residential city of Cape Coral, it anchors the Cape Coral–Fort Myers metropolitan statistical area, which encompasses Lee County and has an estimated population of 875,607 as of 2025.

Fort Myers is a gateway to the Southwest Florida region and a major tourist destination within the state. The winter estates of Thomas Edison ("Seminole Lodge") and Henry Ford ("The Mangoes") are major attractions. The city takes its name from a local former fort that was built during the Seminole Wars. The fort took its name from Colonel Abraham Myers in 1850; Myers served in the United States Army, mostly in the Quartermaster Department, at various posts from 1833 to 1861, and was the quartermaster general of the Confederate States Army from 1861 to 1864.

Centennial Park downtown along the Caloosahatchee River, the IMAG History & Science Center, Calusa Nature Center and Planetarium, and other historical sites are among the attractions.

== History ==
According to some historians, the Calusa capital was located near Fort Myers. Following European contact, Spain had colonial influence in Florida, succeeded by Great Britain and lastly the United States.

=== Seminole Wars ===
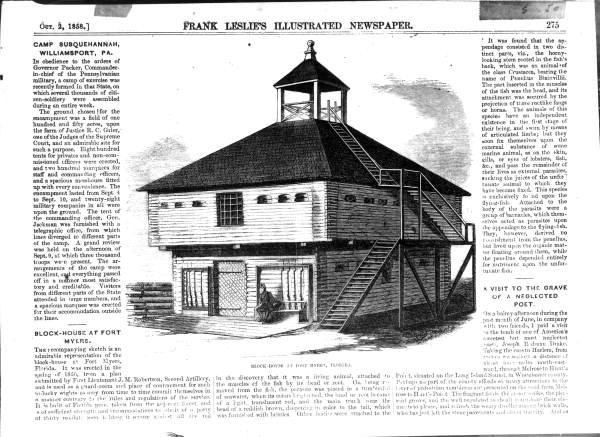
Blockhouse at Fort Myers

During the Second Seminole War, the U.S. Army operated Fort Dulaney at Punta Rassa, at the mouth of the Caloosahatchee River. (Note: See the Battle of the Caloosahatchee) When a hurricane destroyed Fort Dulaney in October 1841, army operations were moved up the Caloosahatchee River to a site named Fort Harvie. Fort Harvie was abandoned in 1842, as the Second Seminole War wound down. After the Paynes Creek incident in 1849, the Army returned to the Caloosahatchee River in 1850.

Major David E. Twiggs, then stationed at Fort Brooke (present day-Tampa), gave orders for two companies of artillery to "select a suitable place for the establishment of a post and immediately throw up such light works as may secure [their] stores, and remove from the Indians any temptation to which [their] isolated position may give rise." The new Fort Myers was built on the burned ruins of Fort Harvie.

The fort was named for Brevet Colonel Abraham Charles Myers, quartermaster for the Army's Department of Florida and future son-in-law of Major Twiggs. It covered about 139 acres (56 ha), and soon had 57 buildings, including a two-story blockhouse that was pictured in Frank Leslie's Illustrated Newspaper, and a 1,000-foot-long (300 m) wharf at which ships could dock. Irvin Solomon notes that Fort Myers was described "as 'one of the finest and largest' forts of the Seminole Wars". It was abandoned in 1858, at the end of the Third Seminole War.

=== Civil War ===
During the American Civil War, Confederate blockade runners and cattle ranchers were based in Fort Myers. These settlers prospered through trading with the Seminole and Union soldiers.

The United States Army set up a camp on Useppa Island, near the entrance to Charlotte Harbor, in December 1863. It was intended as a place from which to recruit Union sympathizers, Confederate deserters, conscription-evaders, and to raid into the interior and interfere with Confederate efforts to round up cattle for supply to the Confederate Army. After some probes along the Peace and Myakka rivers, which had mixed results, operations were moved to the mainland. Troops from the 47th Pennsylvania Infantry Regiment and the 2nd Regiment of Florida Rangers, later reorganized as the 2nd Florida Cavalry Regiment, left Key West, Florida for Fort Myers early in January 1864. The Union soldiers reached Fort Myers quickly enough to capture three Confederate sympathizers before they could act on orders to burn the fort to keep it out of Union hands. Beyond the principal cause for occupying the fort of providing support for Union sympathizers and local residents disaffected with Confederate taxation and conscription, the fort provided access to the large cattle herds in southern Florida, support for the blockade of the southwest Florida coast being conducted by the U.S. Navy, and a haven for any escaped slaves in the area.

In April 1864, after the troops from the 47th Pennsylvania Infantry Regiment had been transferred to Louisiana, Companies D and I of the 2nd United States Colored Infantry Regiment were transferred from Key West to Fort Myers, and remained at the fort until it was abandoned. Company G of the regiment had also been sent to Fort Myers by early May. Solomon argues that Brevet Brigadier General Daniel Phineas Woodbury, commandant of the District of Key West and the Tortugas, intended that action to be an irritant to the Confederacy. The presence of the black soldiers, who made up the majority of troops used in raids into Confederate territory, played on Confederate fears of armed blacks. It was reported that Woodbury took pleasure in placing a "prickly pear cactus under the Confederate saddle".

By the spring of 1864, Fort Myers was protected by a 500-foot-long (150 m) breastwork, 7 feet (2.1 m) high and 15 feet (4.6 m) wide, extending in an arc around the land side of the fort. The Seminole War-era blockhouse had been repaired, and another two-story blockhouse built. The fort was soon harboring more than 400 civilians and Confederate army deserters. Many of the white men enlisted in the 2nd Florida Union Cavalry. Although designated as cavalry, the members of the regiment stationed at Fort Myers were never mounted. Escaped slaves that came to the fort were recruited into the 2nd United States Colored Infantry Regiment.

The Union achieved control of the full length of the Mississippi River after the fall of Vicksburg in July 1863. The Confederate Army then became dependent on Florida for most of its beef supply. By the end of 1863, between 1,000 and 2,000 head of cattle were being shipped to the Confederate Army from Florida every week.

As 1864 progressed, Union troops and sympathizers began driving cattle to Punta Rassa to supply Union ships on blockade duty and Union-held Key West, reducing the supply of cattle available to Confederate forces. The increased shipping from Punta Rassa led the Union Army to build a barracks and a wharf there. By one Confederate estimate, the Union shipped 4,500 head of cattle from Punta Rassa.

The Battle of Fort Myers was fought on February 20, 1865, in Lee County, Florida, during the last months of the American Civil War. This small engagement is known as the "southernmost land battle of the Civil War." (Note: However, see Battle of Palmito Ranch.)

=== Settlement and founding ===
The Fort Myers community was founded by Captain Manuel A. Gonzalez on February 21, 1866. Captain Gonzalez was familiar with the area as a result of his years of service delivering mail and supplies to the Union Army at the fort during the Seminole Indian Wars and Civil War.

When the U.S. government abandoned the fort following the Civil War, Gonzalez sailed from Key West to establish the community. Three weeks later, Joseph Vivas and his wife, Christianna Stirrup Vivas, arrived with Gonzalez's wife, Evalina, and daughter Mary.

Gonzalez settled his family near the abandoned Fort Myers, where he began the area's first trading post. He traded tobacco, beads, and gunpowder and sold otter, bobcat, and gator hides to the neighboring Seminoles. A small community began to form around the trading post.

In the late 19th century, northerners began to travel to Florida in the winter. Some saw development opportunities. In 1881, the wealthy industrialist Hamilton Disston of Philadelphia, Pennsylvania, came to the Caloosahatchee Valley. He planned to dredge and drain the Everglades for development. Diston connected Lake Okeechobee with the Caloosahatchee River; this allowed steamboats to run from the Gulf of Mexico to Lake Okeechobee and up the Kissimmee River.

On August 12, 1885, the small town of Fort Myers was incorporated with 349 residents. It was the second-largest town on Florida's Gulf Coast south of Cedar Key.

In 1885, inventor Thomas Alva Edison was cruising Florida's west coast and stopped to visit Fort Myers. He soon bought 13 acres (5.3 ha) along the Caloosahatchee River in town. He built his home, "Seminole Lodge," as a winter retreat. It included a laboratory for his continuing work. After the lodge was completed in 1886, Edison and his wife, Mina, spent many winters in Fort Myers. Edison also enjoyed local recreational fishing, for which Fort Myers had gained a national reputation.

Despite Edison's initial offer to light the town, Fort Myers was first electrified on New Year's Day in 1898 by the Seminole Canning Company, a local company that canned and preserved fruit.

In 1898, the Royal Palm Hotel was constructed. This luxury hotel attracted tourists and established Fort Myers nationally as a winter resort destination.

=== 20th century ===
On May 10, 1904, access to the Fort Myers area was greatly improved with the opening of the Atlantic Coast Line Railroad, connecting Punta Gorda to Fort Myers. This route provided Lee County with both passenger and freight railroad service. The arrival of the railroad, however, also led to greater segregation in Fort Myers. With the railroad came the need for more unskilled labor and the arrival of a less educated workforce, compared to many African Americans who had already resided in town, some of whom were tradespersons, vendors, and landowners. These more middle-class black citizens, as well as the new African-American laborers, were increasingly pressured to move to the segregated area that would become known as Safety Hill. This area of town, as can be seen in contemporary photographs, had lower-quality houses and street surfaces. The area, now known as Dunbar, is still highly segregated from the rest of Fort Myers.

In 1907, the Federal Agency headquarters for the Seminole tribes was relocated to Fort Myers. It remained there until 1913.

In 1908, the Arcade Theater was constructed in Downtown Fort Myers. Originally a vaudeville house, Edison viewed films here for the first time with friends Henry Ford and Harvey Firestone. With the growth of the film industry, the Arcade Theatre was converted into a full movie house. A wall divided the stage into two screening rooms. Changes in moviegoing habits since the late 20th century have led to the theater's renovation for use again in live performance. It is now host to the Florida Repertory Theatre, a performing arts hall.

During World War I, Edison became concerned about America's reliance on foreign rubber supplies. He partnered with tire producer Harvey Firestone (of the Firestone Tire and Rubber Company) and Henry Ford (of the Ford Motor Company) to try to find a rubber tree or plant that could grow quickly in the United States. He sought one that would contain enough latex to support his research endeavor. In 1927, the three men contributed $25,000 each and formed the Edison Botanic Research Corporation to find a solution to this problem. In 1928, the Edison Botanic Research Corporation laboratory was constructed. It was in Fort Myers that Edison conducted the majority of his research and planted exotic plants and trees. He sent the results and sample rubber residues to West Orange, New Jersey for further work at his large Thomas A. Edison "Invention Factory" (now preserved in the Thomas Edison National Historical Park). Through Edison's efforts, the royal palms lining Riverside Avenue (now McGregor Boulevard) were imported and planted. They inspired Fort Myers' nickname as "City of Palms".

After testing around 17,000 plant samples, Edison eventually discovered a source in the goldenrod plant (Solidago leavenworthii). The rubber project was transferred to the United States Department of Agriculture five years later.

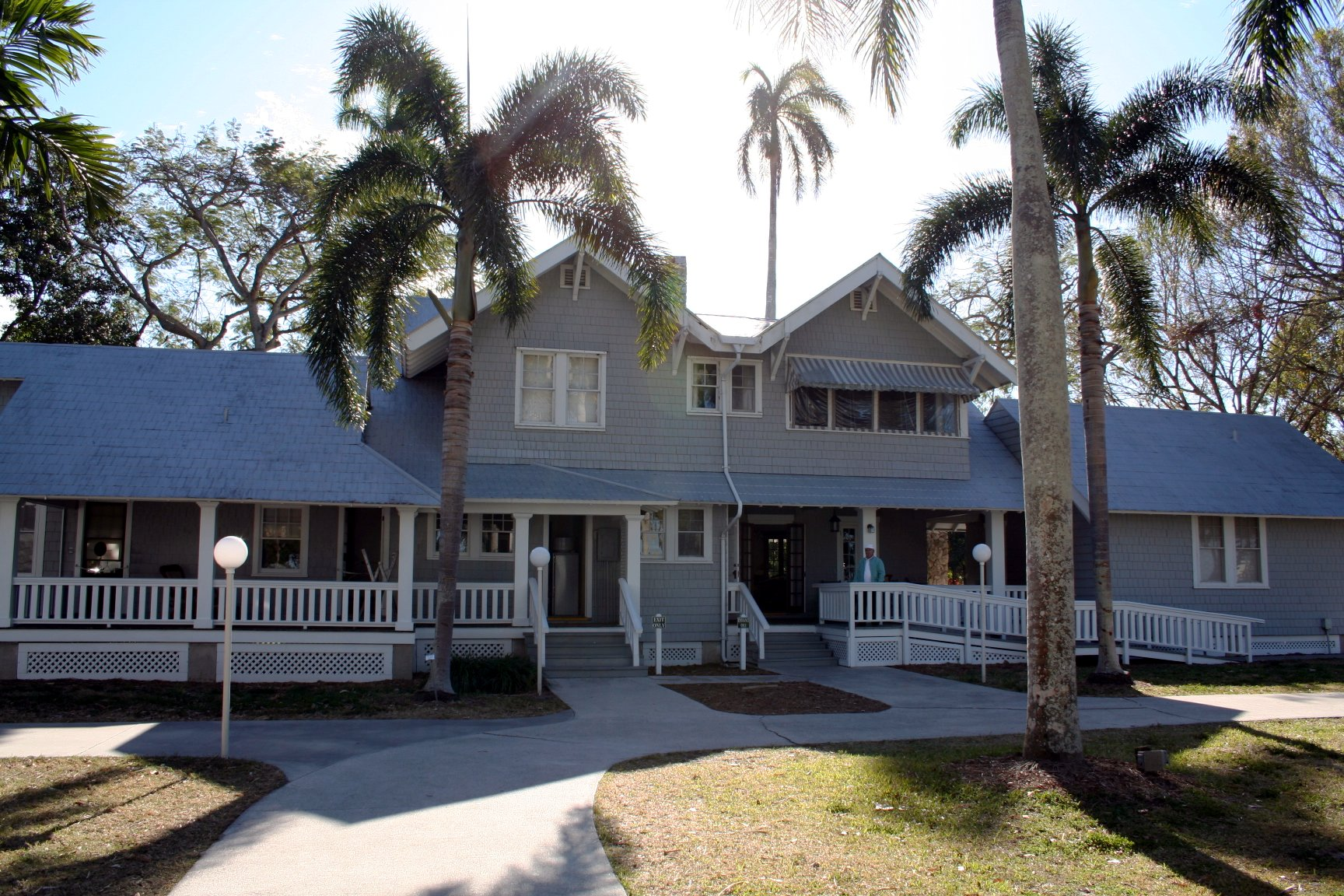
The Mangoes: Henry Ford's winter home

In 1916, automobile magnate Ford purchased the home next to Edison's from Robert Smith of New York. Ford named his estate "the Mangoes". Ford's craftsman-style "bungalow" was built in 1911 by Smith. Ford, Firestone, and Edison were leaders in American industry and part of an exclusive group titled "the Millionaires' Club". The three men have been memorialized in statues in downtown Fort Myers' Centennial Park.

In 1924, with the beginning of construction of the Edison Bridge, named for Edison, the city's population steadily grew. The bridge was opened on February 11, 1931, the 84th birthday of its namesake. Edison dedicated the bridge and was the first to drive across it.

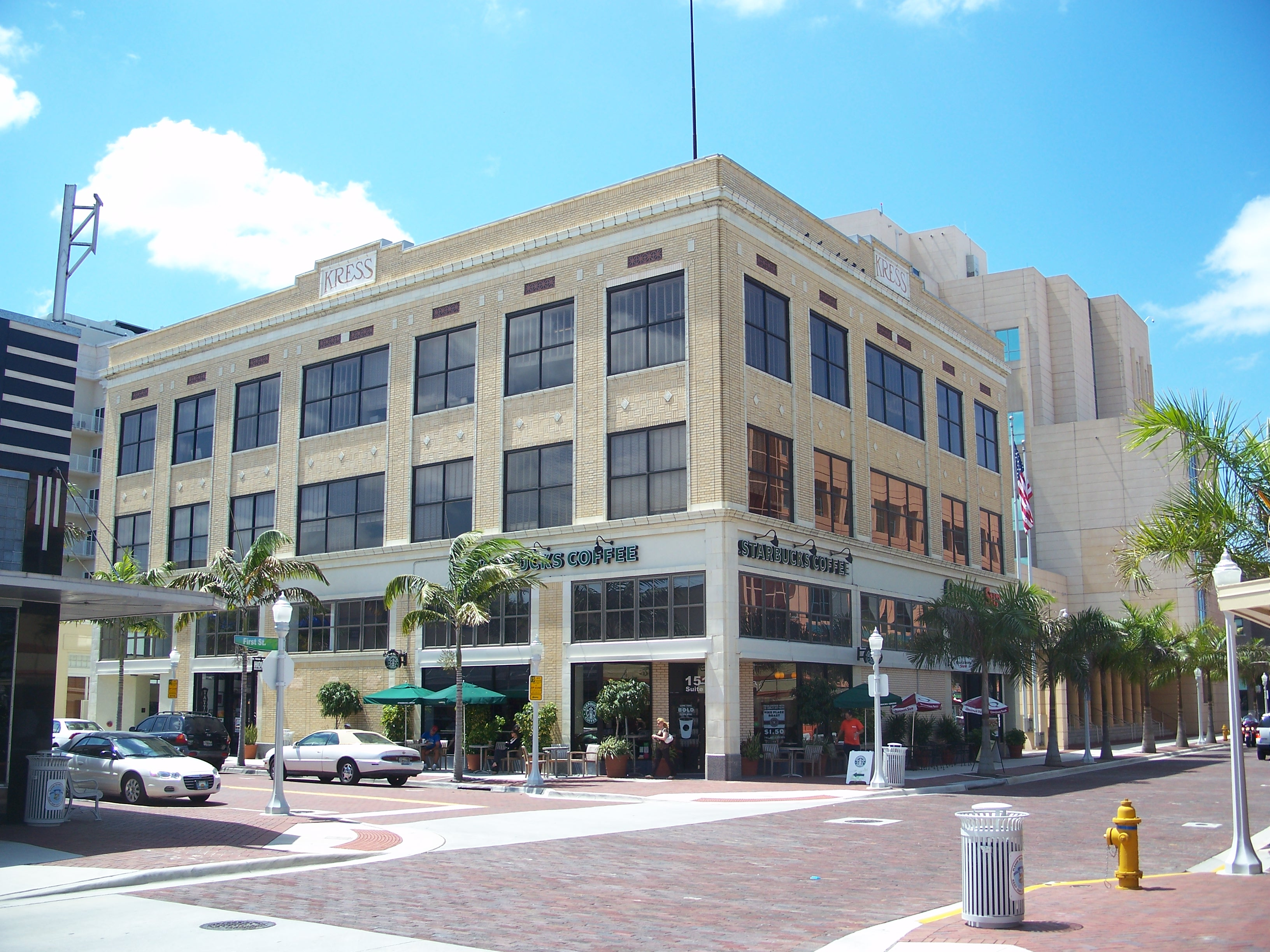
S. H. Kress & Co. building in downtown Fort Myers

In the decade following the bridge's construction, the city had a real estate boom. Several new residential subdivisions were built beyond downtown, including Dean Park, Edison Park, and Seminole Park. Edison Park, located across McGregor Boulevard from the Edison and Ford properties, includes a number of Fort Myers' most stately homes. The population of Fort Myers City had been 575 citizens in 1890. By 1930, it had climbed to 9,082.

In 1947, Mina Edison deeded Seminole Lodge to the city of Fort Myers, in memory of her late husband and for the enjoyment of the public. By 1988, the adjacent Henry Ford winter estate was purchased by the city and opened for public tours in 1990. The combined properties today are known as the Edison and Ford Winter Estates.

==== Hurricane Ian ====
Fort Myers suffered catastrophic damage from Hurricane Ian on September 28, 2022.

== Geography and climate ==
According to the United States Census Bureau, the city has a total area of 40.4 square miles (105 km^{2}), of which 31.8 square miles (82 km^{2}) is land and 8.6 square miles (22 km^{2}) (21.25%) is water.

Fort Myers had a humid subtropical climate (Köppen Cfa) in the past, but in the 1991-2020 reference period has become a tropical monsoon climate (Am), bordering on a tropical savanna climate (Aw) .

The temperature rarely rises to 100 °F (38 °C) or lowers to the freezing mark. Rainfall averages just over 57 inches per year, strongly concentrated during the rainy season (June to September) with its frequent showers and thunderstorms; on average, these four months deliver 67 percent of annual rainfall. From October to May, average monthly rainfall is less than 3.5 inches. In years with drier than average conditions from winter into mid-spring, drought can develop, and brush fires can be a significant threat. Reflecting the June to September wet season, Fort Myers has 89 days annually in which a thunderstorm is close enough for thunder to be heard, the most in the nation.

The monthly daily average temperature ranges from 64.7 °F (18.2 °C) in January to 83.4 °F (28.6 °C) in August, with the annual mean being 75.4 °F (24.1 °C).

Records range from 24 °F (−4 °C) on December 29, 1894 up to 103 °F (39 °C) on June 16–17, 1981.

Climate data for Fort Myers, Florida (Page Field), 1991–2020 normals, (Note: Mean monthly maxima and minima (i.e. the expected highest and lowest temperature readings at any point during the year or given month) calculated based on data at said location from 1991 to 2020.) extremes 1892–present
Month	Jan	Feb	Mar	Apr	May	Jun	Jul	Aug	Sep	Oct	Nov	Dec	Year
Record high °F (°C)	88 (31)	92 (33)	94 (34)	96 (36)	99 (37)	103 (39)	101 (38)	100 (38)	98 (37)	95 (35)	95 (35)	91 (33)	103 (39)
Mean maximum °F (°C)	84.6 (29.2)	85.7 (29.8)	88.0 (31.1)	91.3 (32.9)	94.8 (34.9)	96.0 (35.6)	95.8 (35.4)	95.5 (35.3)	94.1 (34.5)	91.7 (33.2)	87.9 (31.1)	85.1 (29.5)	96.7 (35.9)
Mean daily maximum °F (°C)	75.0 (23.9)	78.0 (25.6)	81.1 (27.3)	85.3 (29.6)	89.5 (31.9)	91.0 (32.8)	91.6 (33.1)	91.7 (33.2)	90.0 (32.2)	86.6 (30.3)	81.3 (27.4)	77.3 (25.2)	84.9 (29.4)
Daily mean °F (°C)	64.7 (18.2)	67.3 (19.6)	70.3 (21.3)	74.8 (23.8)	79.3 (26.3)	82.3 (27.9)	83.2 (28.4)	83.4 (28.6)	82.2 (27.9)	78.0 (25.6)	71.5 (21.9)	67.3 (19.6)	75.4 (24.1)
Mean daily minimum °F (°C)	54.3 (12.4)	56.6 (13.7)	59.6 (15.3)	64.3 (17.9)	69.1 (20.6)	73.6 (23.1)	74.7 (23.7)	75.1 (23.9)	74.3 (23.5)	69.4 (20.8)	61.8 (16.6)	57.3 (14.1)	65.8 (18.8)
Mean minimum °F (°C)	38.1 (3.4)	41.5 (5.3)	45.5 (7.5)	53.5 (11.9)	61.2 (16.2)	69.5 (20.8)	71.5 (21.9)	72.3 (22.4)	70.4 (21.3)	57.8 (14.3)	49.1 (9.5)	43.0 (6.1)	36.4 (2.4)
Record low °F (°C)	27 (−3)	27 (−3)	33 (1)	39 (4)	50 (10)	58 (14)	66 (19)	65 (18)	63 (17)	45 (7)	34 (1)	24 (−4)	24 (−4)
Average precipitation inches (mm)	2.43 (62)	1.78 (45)	2.07 (53)	2.44 (62)	3.46 (88)	9.66 (245)	9.38 (238)	10.43 (265)	9.00 (229)	3.08 (78)	1.78 (45)	1.90 (48)	57.41 (1,458)
Average precipitation days (≥ 0.01 in)	5.8	5.1	5.0	5.0	8.1	16.7	18.5	18.4	15.8	7.7	4.3	5.4	115.8
Source: NOAA

== Demographics ==
Historical population
Census	Pop.	Note	%±
1890	575		—
1900	943		64.0%
1910	2,463		161.2%
1920	3,678		49.3%
1930	9,082		146.9%
1940	10,604		16.8%
1950	13,195		24.4%
1960	22,523		70.7%
1970	27,351		21.4%
1980	36,638		34.0%
1990	45,206		23.4%
2000	48,208		6.6%
2010	62,298		29.2%
2020	86,395		38.7%
2025 (est.)	101,581	▲	17.6%

Fort Myers is one of two cities that make up the Cape Coral-Fort Myers, FL Metropolitan Statistical Area of Lee County. The 2020 population for the metropolitan statistical area (MSA) in 2020 was 760,822, and it was the 73rd highest populated MSA in the US, as of 2020.

The population of the Cape Coral-Fort Myers-Naples, FL Combined Statistical Area in 2020 was 1,188,319, and it was the 47th highest populated combined statistical area (CSA) in the US, as of 2020.

=== Racial and ethnic composition ===
Fort Myers, Florida – Racial and ethnic composition Note: the US Census treats Hispanic/Latino as an ethnic category. This table excludes Latinos from the racial categories and assigns them to a separate category. Hispanics/Latinos may be of any race.
Race / Ethnicity (NH = Non-Hispanic)	Pop 2000	Pop 2010	Pop 2020	% 2000	% 2010	% 2020
White (NH)	23,700	27,786	41,044	49.16%	44.60%	47.51%
Black (NH)	15,751	19,495	18,891	32.67%	31.29%	21.87%
Native American or Alaska Native (NH)	115	142	135	0.24%	0.23%	0.16%
Asian (NH)	453	946	2,085	0.94%	1.52%	2.41%
Pacific Islander or Native Hawaiian (NH)	24	30	16	0.05%	0.05%	0.02%
Other race (NH)	128	459	666	0.05%	0.27%	0.77%
Mixed race or Multiracial (NH)	1,053	1,002	3,157	2.18%	1.61%	3.65%
Hispanic or Latino (any race)	6,984	12,438	20,401	14.49%	19.97%	23.61%
Total	48,208	62,298	86,395	100.00%	100.00%	100.00%

=== 2020 census ===
As of the 2020 census, Fort Myers had a population of 86,395. The median age was 41.7 years. 19.7% of residents were under the age of 18, and 22.9% of residents were 65 years of age or older. For every 100 females, there were 96.4 males, and for every 100 females age 18 and over there were 94.3 males age 18 and over.

99.3% of residents lived in urban areas, while 0.7% lived in rural areas.

There were 36,084 households in Fort Myers, of which 24.7% had children under the age of 18 living in them. Of all households, 39.3% were married-couple households, 20.6% were households with a male householder and no spouse or partner present, and 32.3% were households with a female householder and no spouse or partner present. About 31.5% of all households were made up of individuals, and 13.5% had someone living alone who was 65 years of age or older.

There were 45,595 housing units, of which 20.9% were vacant. The homeowner vacancy rate was 3.1%, and the rental vacancy rate was 14.1%.

Racial composition as of the 2020 census
Race	Number	Percent
White	45,066	52.2%
Black or African American	19,459	22.5%
American Indian and Alaska Native	736	0.9%
Asian	2,125	2.5%
Native Hawaiian and Other Pacific Islander	24	0.0%
Some other race	8,583	9.9%
Two or more races	10,402	12.0%

=== 2010 census ===
As of the 2010 United States census, there were 62,298 people, 24,352 households, and 14,192 families residing in the city.

== Government ==
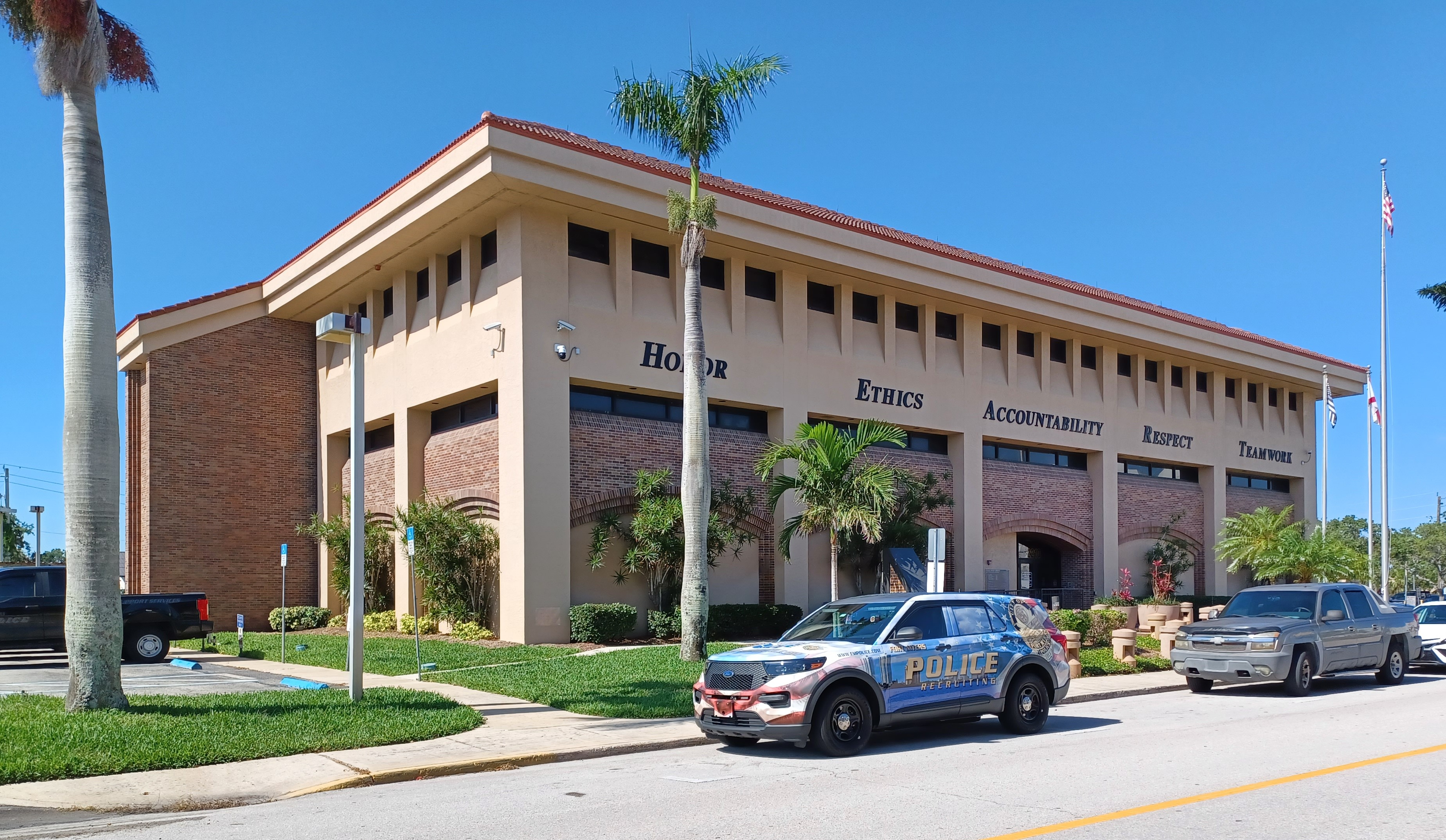
Fort Myers Police Department

Fort Myers has a council–manager government in which the city council consists of a mayor and six council members. The city council is responsible for establishing policy, passing local ordinances, voting on appropriations, and developing an overall vision for the city. The mayor is elected by registered voters city-wide. The mayor of Fort Myers is Kevin B. Anderson. Council members are elected by registered voters in their ward and represent that particular ward for a four-year term. Council members must continue to reside in that particular ward.

Policing of Fort Myers is performed by the Fort Myers Police Department.

== Education ==
=== Secondary schools ===
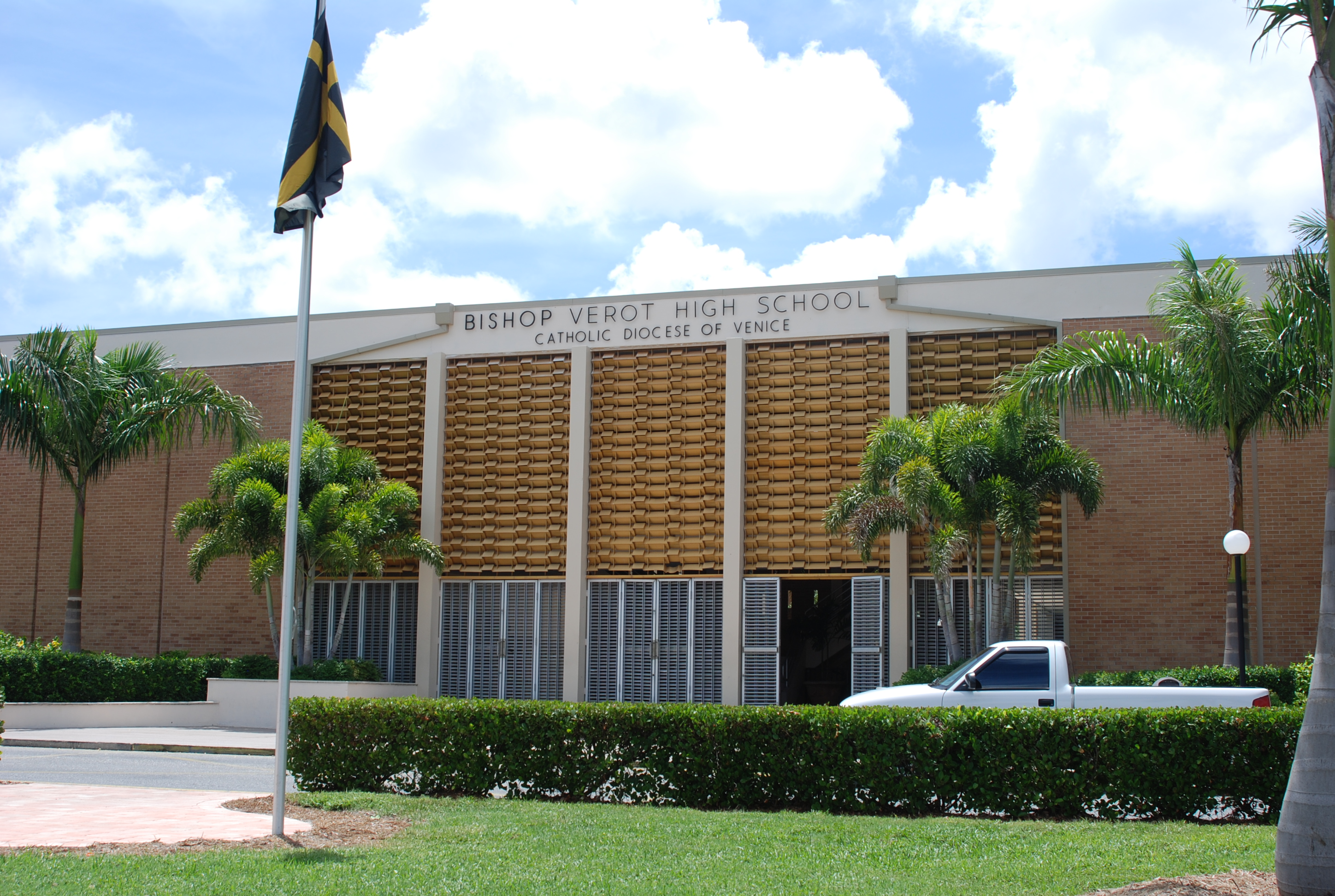
Bishop Verot Catholic High School

See: Lee County School District for other public schools in the area.

Secondary schools in the city include:

- Dunbar High School, an International Baccalaureate school
- Fort Myers Senior High School, an International Baccalaureate school
- Bishop Verot High School, a private, Roman Catholic high school in Fort Myers, operated by the Diocese of Venice, Florida

=== Higher education ===
Institutions of higher learning in the city include:

- Hodges University
- Keiser University
- Nova Southeastern University
- Rasmussen College
- Southern Technical College
- Fort Myers Technical College

Florida Gulf Coast University is situated in unincorporated Lee County, outside Fort Myers' city limits.

=== Libraries ===
Library Services include:

- Fort Myers Regional Library: The Fort Myers Regional Library is the hub for the Lee County Library System, holding the main collections of legal, business, news, and financial information. The library is located in downtown Fort Myers.
- Dunbar-Jupiter Hammon Public Library: The library opened on October 7, 1974. The founders named the library in honor of the first African poet to have his work published, Jupiter Hammon. Dunbar, the community's name, was added at the request of its residents. The library was moved in 1996 to its current location on Blount Street. It is home to the largest African-American book collection in southwest Florida.

== Sports ==
The City of Palms Classic is an annual high school basketball tournament held in Fort Myers since 1973. By 2015, 120 players that had participated in the tournament had been named McDonald's All-Americans and 94 had been drafted into the NBA.

The Florida Eels is a Tier III junior hockey program in the USPHL with two teams; one in the Premier Division and one in the Elite Division. Both teams have performed well in their regular season and playoffs, advancing to Nationals on multiple occasions. The Fort Myers Skatium is their home rink.

JetBlue Park is the spring training home of the Boston Red Sox. During the summer, JetBlue Park is home of the Florida Complex League Red Sox, the Red Sox's rookie league team competing in the Florida Complex League.

== Points of interest ==
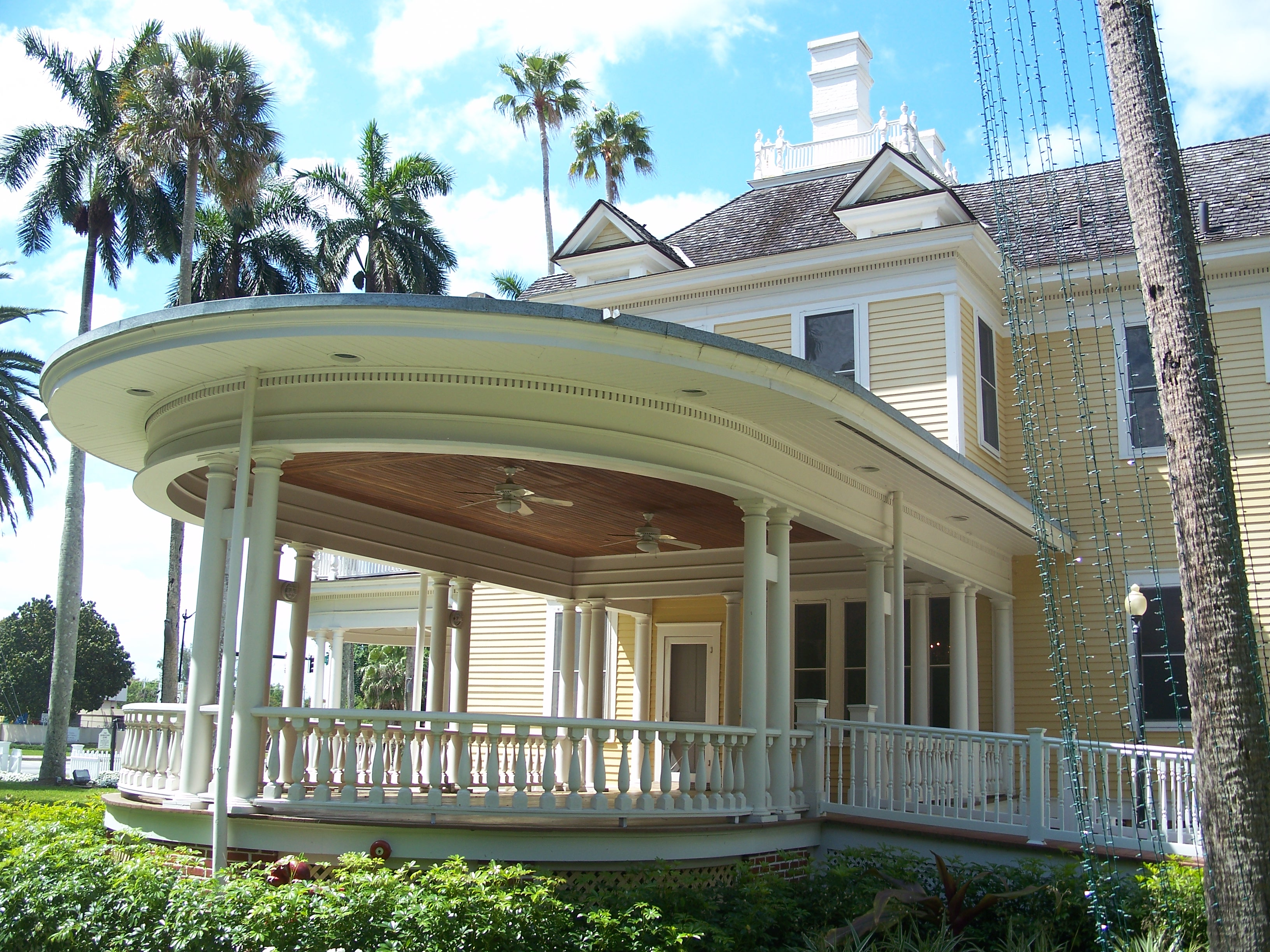
Murphy-Burroughs House

- The Calusa Nature Center and Planetarium is a private, not-for-profit, environmental education organization. Set on a 105-acre (0.42 km^{2}) site, it has a museum, three nature trails, a planetarium, butterfly and bird aviaries, a gift shop, and meeting and picnic areas.
- City of Palms Park, former home of the Boston Red Sox spring training program, close to downtown Fort Myers
- Edison and Ford Winter Estates
- Edison Mall
- Historic Downtown, waterfront entertainment district
- Murphy-Burroughs House
- IMAG History & Science Center
- Southwest Florida Museum of History
- Ostego Bay Foundation Marine Science Center

== Public transportation ==
=== Airports ===
The Fort Myers metropolitan area is served by two nearby airports. Southwest Florida International Airport (RSW) is located southeast of the city. The airport, which sits on 13,555 acres of land, is the 45th busiest airport in the United States (by annual passengers). In 2018 the airport served 9,373,178 passengers. Page Field is a small general aviation airport whose primary traffic consist of smaller aircraft.

=== Ground transport ===
Buses run by LeeTran provide local service in Fort Myers.

== Fort Myers in popular culture ==
=== In film ===
- The abandoned city scene with the Edison Theatre, from the movie Day of the Dead (1985) was filmed in downtown Fort Myers.
- Some courthouse and other "city" scenes in Just Cause (1995) were filmed in downtown Fort Myers.
- Part of the independent film Trans (1999) was filmed in Fort Myers.
- The animated film Leo (2023) is set in Fort Myers, with one of the main locations in the film being the fictional Fort Myers Elementary School.

=== In print ===
- Fort Myers is part of the setting of Red Grass River: A Legend (1998), a novel by James Carlos Blake.

== Notable people ==
=== Present ===
- Nate Allen, safety for Miami Dolphins
- Haley Bennett, actress
- Jason Bartlett, Tampa Bay Rays shortstop
- Bob Beamon, track and field athlete, gold medalist in 1968 Summer Olympics long jump, world record holder 1968 to 1991
- Liston Bochette, Olympian; Fort Myers City Council member
- Bert Blyleven, Hall of Fame pitcher for Minnesota Twins, Texas Rangers, Pittsburgh Pirates, Cleveland Indians and California Angels
- James Carlos Blake, author and former faculty member of Edison Community College
- Phillip Buchanon, cornerback for the Washington Redskins, Tampa Bay Buccaneers, Houston Texans, Oakland Raiders
- Stacy Carter, former WWE wrestler
- Stew Cliburn, Baseball player and coach.
- Terrence Cody, nose tackle for Baltimore Ravens
- Casey Coleman, former pitcher for Chicago Cubs
- Noel Devine, running back for CFL's Montreal Alouettes
- Richard Fain, former NFL player
- Earnest Graham, NFL running back, Tampa Bay Buccaneers
- Mike Greenwell, former Boston Red Sox left fielder and NASCAR driver
- Nolan Henke, professional golfer
- Anthony Henry, cornerback, Detroit Lions, Dallas Cowboys, Cleveland Browns
- Adam Johnson, former pitcher for Minnesota Twins
- Tarah Kayne, figure skater, 2016 national champion
- Jevon Kearse, defensive end, Philadelphia Eagles, Tennessee Titans
- Terri Kimball, Playboy Playmate of the Month for May 1964
- Derek Lamely, professional golfer
- Craig Leon, music and visual producer of the Ramones, Blondie, Luciano Pavarotti, Joshua Bell
- George McNeill, professional golfer
- Peter Mellor, English-born American footballer and coach
- Terry-Jo Myers, professional golfer, winner of three LPGA Tour tournaments
- Seth Petruzelli, professional MMA fighter
- Plies (Algernod Lanier Washington), rapper
- Lennie Rosenbluth (born 1933), college and NBA basketball player
- Deion Sanders, Hall of Fame NFL cornerback for six teams, inducted to Pro Football Hall of Fame as a Dallas Cowboy, and Major League Baseball outfielder for five teams
- Peggy Schoolcraft, professional bodybuilder, 1997 NPC Team Universe Champion
- Chad Senior, two-time Olympian (Sydney Australia, 2000 - Athens Greece, 2004), competed in pentathlon
- Vonzell Solomon, American Idol third-place finisher
- Greg Spires, former NFL player
- Elissa Steamer, professional skateboarder
- Mike Venafro, former relief pitcher for Oakland Athletics and 4 other MLB teams
- Dan Vogelbach, MLB player
- Noah Waddell, pianist
- Jaylen Watkins, safety for Los Angeles Chargers
- Sammy Watkins, wide receiver for Buffalo Bills, Los Angeles Rams, Kansas City Chiefs, Green Bay Packers, Baltimore Ravens.
- Tommy Watkins, former Minnesota Twins baseball player
- Jeremy Ware, cornerback for Oakland Raiders
- Walt Wesley, professional basketball player (1966–1976) for Cincinnati Royals and six other NBA teams
- Cliff Williams, bass player for AC/DC
- Julio Zuleta, former first baseman for Chicago Cubs

=== Past ===
- Verna Aardema, children's book author
- Patty Berg, Hall of Fame golfer, one of LPGA's founders
- Gerard Damiano, adult film director
- Thomas Edison, improved and perfected the incandescent light bulb and audio recording methods, had a winter estate next to Henry Ford's
- Harvey Firestone, founded Firestone Tire Company, had a winter estate near Edison and Ford's homes
- Henry Ford, founded the Ford Motor Company, and father of the assembly line, had a winter estate next to Thomas Edison's
- Charles Ghigna, poet and children's author known as "Father Goose;" boyhood home 1950-1973
- Mario Henderson, offensive tackle, Oakland Raiders
- Sara Hildebrand, United States Olympic diver (2000, 2004)
- Jan Hooks, American actress and comedian, best known for Saturday Night Live
- Andrew Jacobson (born 1985), Major League Soccer player
- Jerry Lawler, WWE wrestler and announcer
- Clyde Lassen, U.S. Navy Commander, Medal of Honor recipient
- Denise Masino, professional bodybuilder
- Mindy McCready, country music artist
- Norma Miller, Lindy Hop dancer, choreographer, actress, author, and comedian known as the Queen of Swing
- Diamond Dallas Page, former WCW and WWE wrestler, actor
- Kimberly Page, former member of the WCW Nitro Girls and Playboy model
- Charles Rogers, Former NFL running back
- Marius Russo, professional baseball player
- Jean Shepherd, storyteller, humorist, media personality
- Walt Wesley, professional basketball player

== Sister cities ==
Fort Myers has a sister city agreement with:

- Gomel (Belarus)
- Santiago de los Caballeros (Dominican Republic)

== General and cited sources ==
- Buker, George E. (1993). Blockaders, Refugees, & Contrabands: Civil War on Florida's Gulf Coast, 1861-1865. Tuscaloosa, Alabama: The University of Alabama Press. ISBN 0-8173-1296-X.
- Dillon, Rodney E. Jr. (January 1984). ""The Little Affair": The Southwest Florida Campaign, 1863–1864". The Florida Historical Quarterly. 62 (3): 314–31. JSTOR 30146289.
- Solomon, Irvin D. (October 1993). "Southern Extremities: The Significance of Fort Myers in the Civil War". The Florida Historical Quarterly. 72 (2): 129–152.
