= List of colleges and universities in Houston =

The following is a list of colleges and universities in Houston, located within the city limits.

== State universities ==
Four separate and distinct state universities are located in Houston.

The University of Houston is the flagship institution of the University of Houston System. The University of Houston–Clear Lake and the University of Houston–Downtown are stand-alone universities; they are not branch campuses of the University of Houston. Admission into each institution is separate, and each institution has distinct admission criteria and requirements.

Texas Southern University is the only independent state university in Houston and is one of the largest historically black universities in the U.S.

Institution	Founded	Enrollment (Fall 2012)	Campus acreage	Freshman acceptance rate (Fall 2012)	Endowment	Research expenditures (FY 2011)	Carnegie classification	U.S. News Ranking
University of Houston; 4800 Calhoun Rd	1927	40,747	667	55.9%	$862 million	$128 million	Research (Very High)	National Universities, No. 171 (Tier 1)
University of Houston–Clear Lake; 2700 Bay Area Blvd; Partially in the Houston city limits	1971	8,153	524	N/A	$22.6 million	$2.2 million	Master's (Large)	Regional Universities, Tier 2
University of Houston–Downtown; 1 Main St	1974	13,916	20	90.3%	$34.7 million	$1.5 million	Baccalaureate– Diverse	Regional Colleges, Tier 2
Texas Southern University; 3100 Cleburne St	1927	9,646	150	87.3%	$48.7 million	N/A	Doctoral/ Research	National Universities, Tier 2

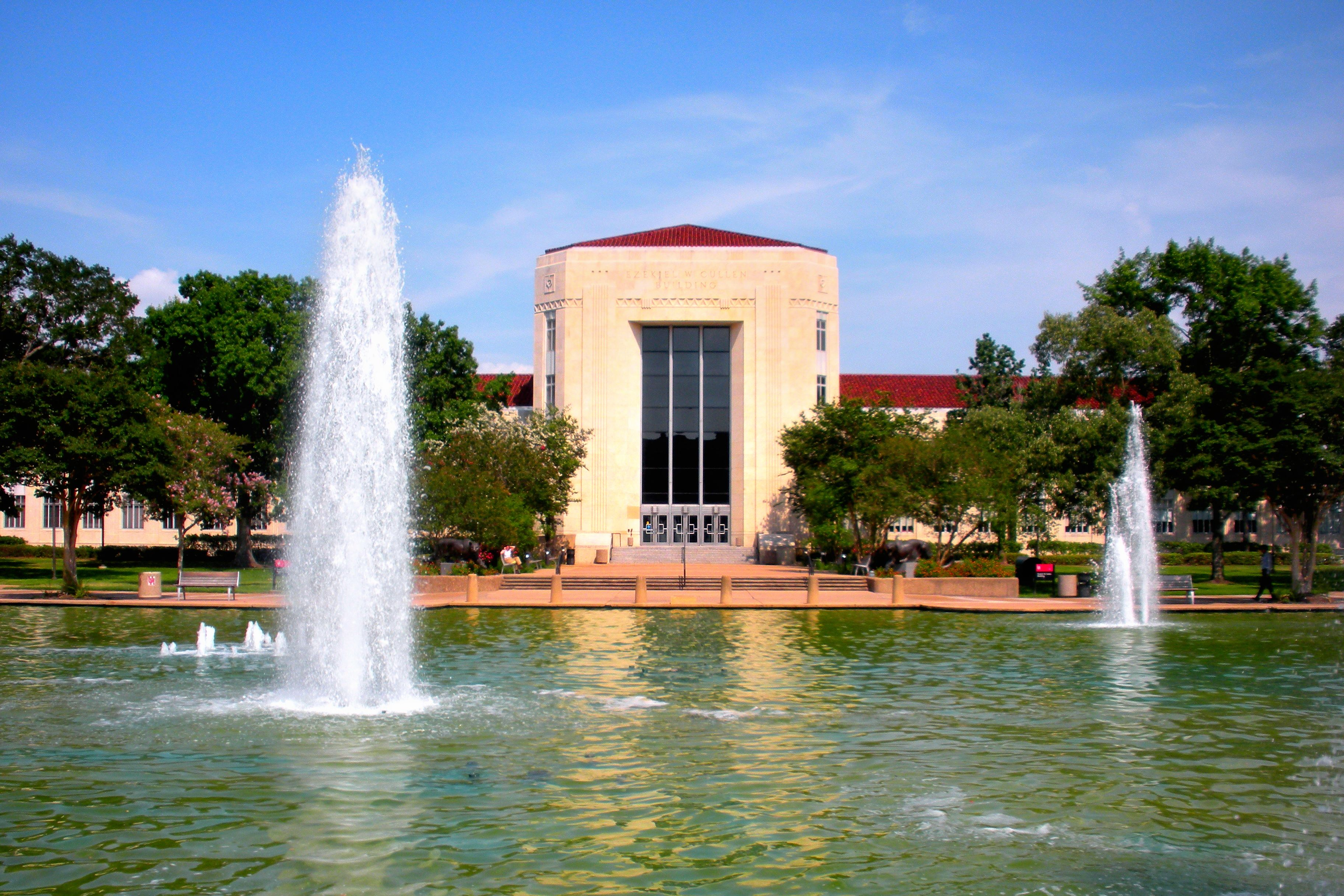
University of Houston

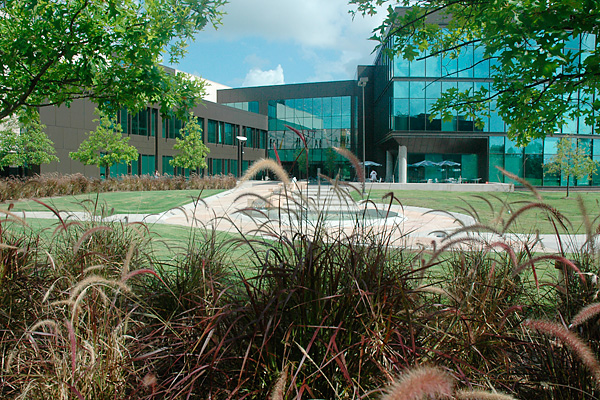
UH–Clear Lake

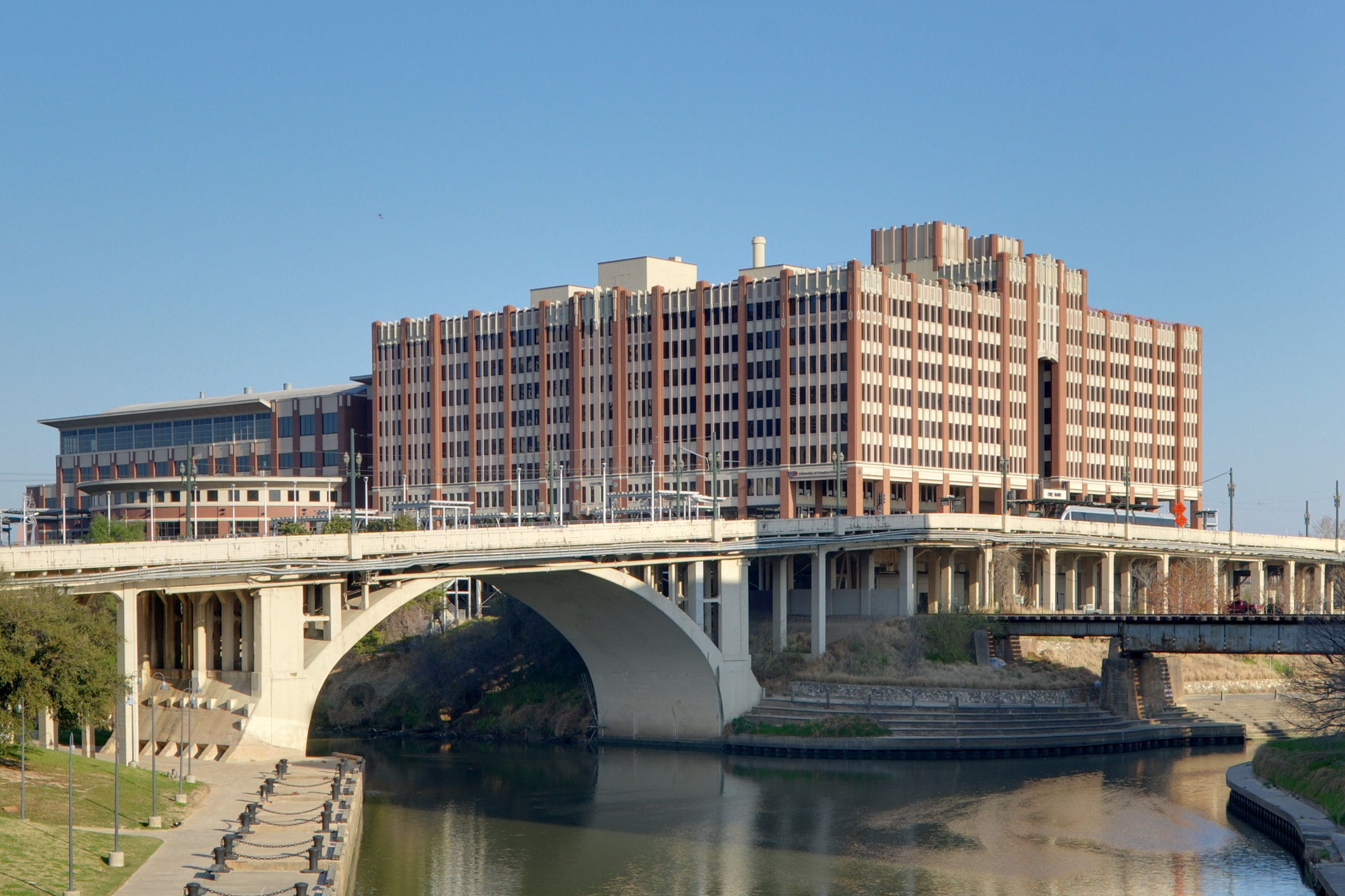
UH–Downtown

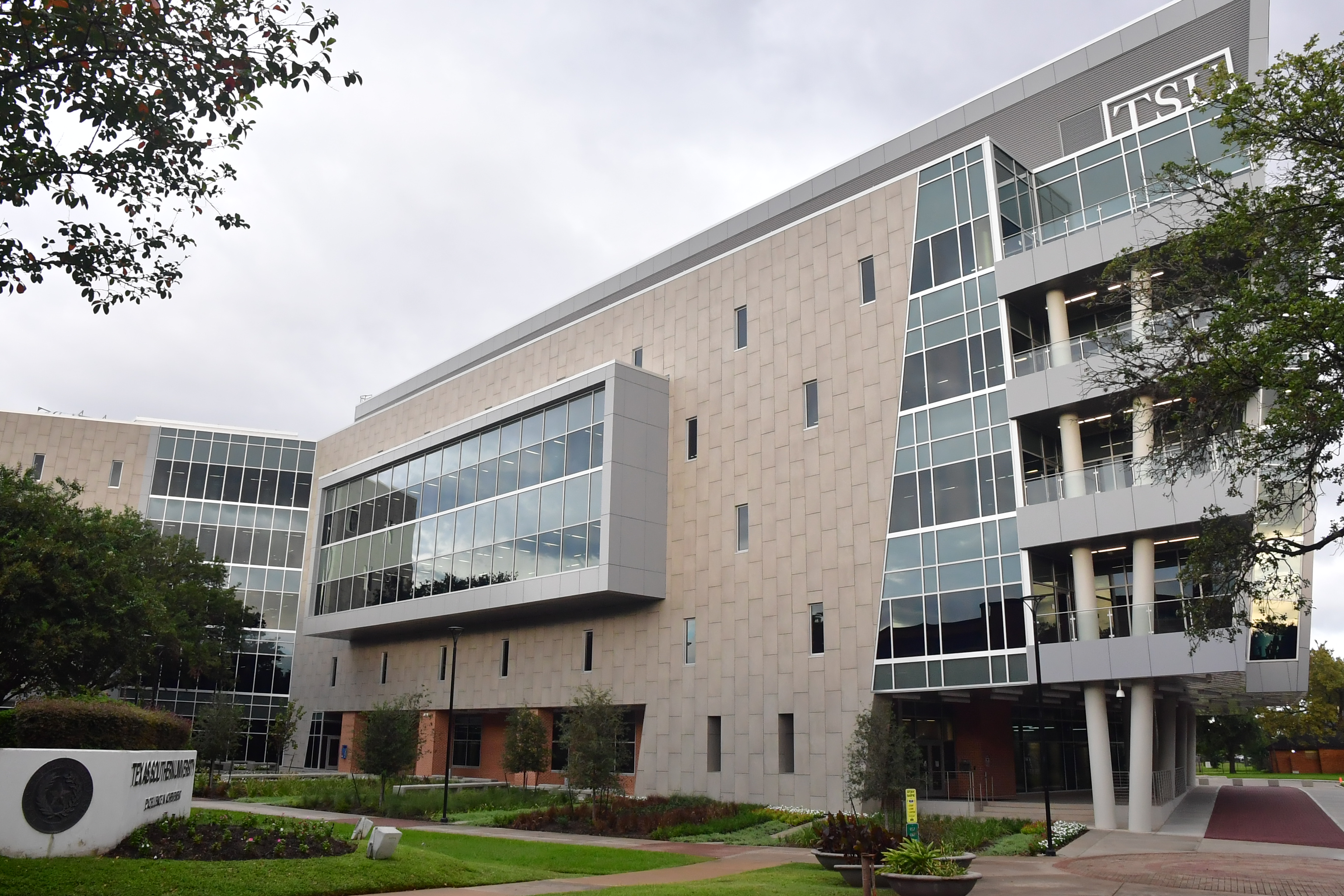
Texas Southern Univ.

== Community colleges ==
Colleges in or nearby Houston

- Houston Community College System
- Lone Star College System
- San Jacinto College

Other Community Colleges around Houston

- Alvin Community College
- Blinn College
- Brazosport College
- College of the Mainland
- Lee College
- Wharton County Junior College

== Private universities ==
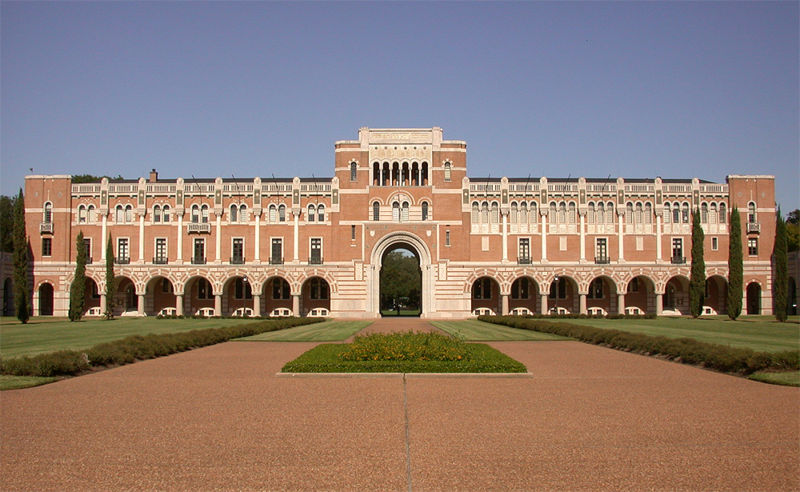
Rice University

Nonsectarian

- Rice University, established in 1912, is a private Tier One research university located at 6100 Main, Houston, Texas. Rice enrolled 3,001 undergraduate, 897 post-graduate, and 1,247 doctoral students and awarded 1,448 degrees in 2007. The university is organized into eight schools offering 40 undergraduate degree programs, 51 masters programs, and 29 doctoral programs.
- Strayer University, established in 1892, is a private college offering associate's, bachelor's and master's degree programs. There are 3 campuses in the Houston area offering both on campus and online class options.
- Houston Graduate School of Theology
- North American University, established in 2007, is a private college offering bachelor's degree programs in three disciplines: computer science, business administration and education.
- American InterContinental University, 9999 Richmond Avenue, Houston, Texas, offers 2 associate degree programs, 24 bachelor programs, and 11 masters programs in 5 disciplines: business administration, accounting, criminal justice, healthcare management and information technology.

Sectarian

- The College of Biblical Studies, 7000 Regency Square Blvd., Houston, Texas, is a Bible college that is non-denominational. It is dual-accredited by SACS-COC and ABHE and was founded in 1976 by Rev. Ernest L. Mays. The school continues to strive to equip African American and other ethnic minority pastors to serve the church and the world through both English- and Spanish-language undergraduate degree offerings.
- Houston Christian University, 7502 Fondren Road, Houston, Texas, offers more than 50 undergraduate majors. Pre-professional programs range from Biblical languages to nursing.
- University of St. Thomas, located at 3800 Montrose, Houston, Texas, is a comprehensive Catholic university, grounded in the liberal arts. Founded by 1947 by Basilian Fathers, it serves as the only Catholic university in the Archdiocese of Galveston-Houston.

== Law schools ==
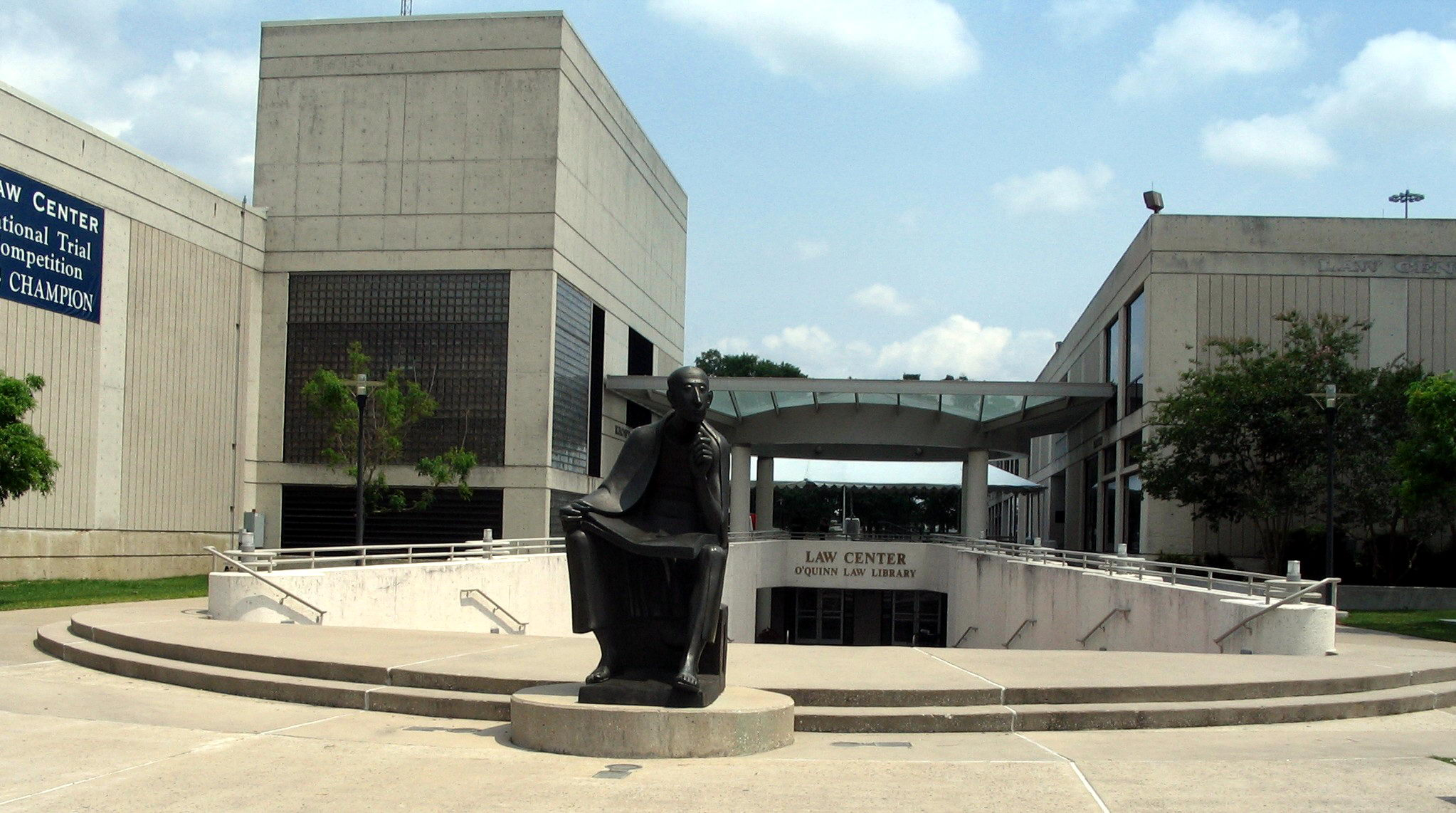
University of Houston Law Center

Public

- Texas Southern University, Thurgood Marshall School of Law
- University of Houston Law Center

Private

- South Texas College of Law

== Independent schools ==
- Center for Advanced Legal Studies

== Health institutions ==
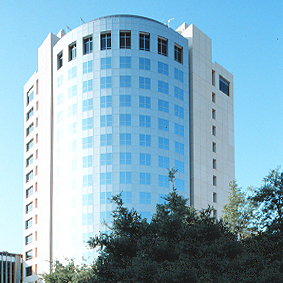
Baylor College of Medicine (BCM) is ranked among the top schools of medicine in the United States.

Public

- Institute of Biosciences and Technology
- Prairie View A&M University College of Nursing
- Texas Southern University School of Pharmacy and Health Science
- Texas Woman's University Health Science Center Houston
- University of Houston College of Medicine
- University of Houston College of Optometry
- University of Houston College of Pharmacy
- The University of Texas Health Science Center at Houston
- MD Anderson Cancer Center

Private

- Baylor College of Medicine
- Memorial Hermann Clinical Innovation and Research Institute (CIRI)
- The Methodist Hospital Research Institute
- Texas Children's Hospital

== Former institutions ==
- Christian College of America
- Gulf Coast Bible College (moved to Oklahoma City, Oklahoma in 1985)
- South Texas Junior College

== See also ==
- List of colleges and universities in Texas
