= 2025 NAIA baseball tournament =

Collegiate baseball tournament

- Teams: 46
- Finals site: Harris Field; Lewiston, Idaho
- Champions: LSU-Shreveport (1st title)
- Winning coach: Brad Neffendorf
- MVP: Isaac Rohde (LHP) (LSU-Shreveport)

The 2025 NAIA baseball tournament was the 68th edition of the NAIA baseball championship. The 46-team tournament began on May 12 with Opening Round games across ten different sites and concluded with the 2025 NAIA World Series in Lewiston, Idaho that started on May 23 and ended a week later on May 30.

LSU-Shreveport won their first national championship in school history as they defeated Southeastern (FL) in the championship game 13–7. Not only did LSU-Shreveport win the national title, they also completed the first undefeated season at any level of college baseball as the Pilots finished the season 59–0.

The 46 participating teams were selected from all eligible NAIA teams. The World Series host and 30 teams were awarded automatic bids as either champions and/or runners-up of their conferences, and 15 teams were selected at-large by the National Selection Committee. Teams were then placed into one of ten pre-determined Opening Round sites, with six sites consisting of five teams and four sites consisting of four teams, each of which is conducted via a double-elimination tournament. The winners of each of the Opening Round sites advance to the NAIA World Series.

For the first time since the 2011 tournament, the 10-run rule applied to all tournament games, except championship game(s) if a team is ahead by 10 or more runs after 7 innings (6½ innings if home team is ahead).

== Tournament procedure ==
A total of 46 teams entered the tournament, with Lewis–Clark State receiving an automatic bid into the Opening Round as World Series host. 30 automatic bids were determined by either winning their conference's regular season championship, conference tournament, and/or conference tournament runner-up. The other 15 bids were at-large, with selections determined by the NAIA Baseball National Selection Committee.

== Opening round hosts ==
On May 1, the NAIA announced the ten opening round host sites, which were played from May 12–15.

Opening Round hosts

Venue	Location	Host
Sherman Field	Lincoln, NE	Concordia University Nebraska
Doyle Buhl Stadium	Williamsburg, KY	University of the Cumberlands
Grizzly Baseball Complex	Lawrenceville, GA	Georgia Gwinnett College
Harris Field	Lewiston, ID	Lewis-Clark State College
Pilot Field	Shreveport, LA	Louisiana State University Shreveport
Ken White Baseball Field	Waleska, GA	Reinhardt University
Ted A. Broer Stadium	Lakeland, FL	Southeastern University
Winterholter Field	Upland, IN	Taylor University
Hunter Wright Stadium	Kingsport, TN	Visit Kingsport
Milton Wheeler Field	Hattiesburg, MS	William Carey University

== Bids ==
=== Automatic ===
School	Conference	Record	Berth	Last NAIA Appearance
Bellevue (NE)	North Star	40–13	Regular season champion	2024 (Williamsburg Bracket)
Briar Cliff (IA)	Great Plains	28–22	Tournament champion	2015 (Shawnee Bracket)
British Columbia	Cascade	36–17	Tournament runner-up	2024 (Lewiston Bracket)
Central Methodist (MO)	Heart	35–13	Tournament champion	2024 (Fayette Bracket)
Concordia (NE)	Great Plains	40–11	Regular season champion	2024 (Shreveport Bracket)
Cumberland (TN)	Mid-South	37–16–1	Tournament champion	2023 (Upland Bracket)
Dickinson State (ND)	North Star	21–29	Tournament runner-up	First Appearance
Georgia Gwinnett	Continental	49–4	Tournament champion	2024 NAIA World Series
Hope International (CA)	Great Southwest	43–8	Tournament champion	2024 NAIA World Series
Indiana Tech	Wolverine-Hoosier	37–19	Tournament champion	2024 (Upland Bracket)
Indiana Wesleyan	Crossroads	29–21	Tournament runner-up	2023 NAIA World Series
Kansas Wesleyan	Kansas	39–13	Tournament champion	2024 NAIA World Series
Lewis-Clark State (ID)	Cascade	35–14	World Series host	2024 (Lewiston Bracket)
Louisiana Christian	Red River	29–24	Tournament runner-up	2024 (Lawrenceville Bracket)
Loyola (LA)	Southern States	38–15	Tournament champion	2024 (Williamsburg Bracket)
LSU–Shreveport	Red River	51–0	Regular season champion	2024 (Shreveport Bracket)
Missouri Baptist	American Midwest	40–9	Tournament champion	2024 (Upland Bracket)
Mount Mercy (IA)	Heart	33–21	Tournament runner-up	2024 (Lincoln Bracket)
Northwestern Ohio	Wolverine-Hoosier	40–13–1	Regular season champion	2024 (Fayette Bracket)
Oakland City (IN)	River States	39–13	Tournament champion	First appearance
Oklahoma Wesleyan	Kansas	46–9	Regular season champion	2024 (Hattiesburg Bracket)
Reinhardt (GA)	Appalachian	42–11	Tournament runner-up	2024 NAIA World Series
Saint Xavier (IL)	Chicagoland	31–22	Tournament champion	2023 (Lawrenceville Bracket)
Science & Arts (OK)	Sooner	34–18	Tournament champion	2024 (Lincoln Bracket)
Southern–New Orleans (LA)	HBCU	24–25	Tournament runner-up	First appearance
Talladega (AL)	HBCU	42–12	Regular season champion	2024 (Shreveport Bracket)
Taylor (IN)	Crossroads	46–9	Regular season champion	2024 (Upland Bracket)
Tennessee Wesleyan	Appalachian	42–11	Tournament champion	2024 NAIA World Series
Wayland Baptist (TX)	Sooner	39–17	Regular season champion	2016 (Hutchinson Bracket)
Webber International (FL)	The Sun	41–13	Tournament champion	2024 (Kingsport Bracket)
William Carey (MS)	Southern States	38–12	Tournament runner-up	2024 NAIA World Series

=== At–Large ===
School	Conference	Record	Last NAIA Appearance
Abraham Baldwin (GA)	Southern States	35–14	First Appearance
Arizona Christian	Great Southwest	39–14–1	2024 NAIA World Series
Ave Maria (FL)	The Sun	27–25	2023 (Hattiesburg Bracket)
Columbia (MO)	American Midwest	41–9	2024 (Kingsport Bracket)
Cumberlands (KY)	Mid-South	45–10	2024 NAIA World Series
Grand View (IA)	Heart	34–11	2023 (Bellevue Bracket)
Houston–Victoria	Red River	38–15	2023 (Hattiesburg Bracket)
IU-Southeast	River States	30–16	2024 NAIA World Series
Johnson (TN)	Appalachian	35–16	First Appearance
Keiser (FL)	The Sun	35–15	2024 (Waleska Bracket)
Mid-America Christian (OK)	Sooner	38–15	2024 (Hattiesburg Bracket)
MidAmerica Nazarene (KS)	Heart	33–16	2024 (Upland Bracket)
Oregon Tech	Cascade	38–14	First appearance
Ottawa (KS)	Kansas	38–14	2022 (Montgomery Bracket)
Southeastern (FL)	The Sun	41–13	2024 NAIA World Series

== Opening Round ==
All game times are listed in local time.

=== Hattiesburg Bracket ===
Hosted by William Carey University at Milton Wheeler Field

==== Bracket ====
Upper round 1
1	William Carey (MS)	6
4	IU–Southeast	10
3	British Columbia	9
2	Oklahoma Wesleyan	3
Lower round 1
1	William Carey (MS)	11
2	Oklahoma Wesleyan	16

Semifinals
4	IU–Southeast	4
3	British Columbia	14^{7}
Lower final
2	Oklahoma Wesleyan	8
4	IU–Southeast	14

Final
3	British Columbia	7^{11}	–
4	IU–Southeast	4	–

==== Results ====
Monday, May 12; 2:00 PM CDT; Game 1	(3) British Columbia	9–3	(2) Oklahoma Wesleyan	Milton Wheeler Field, Hattiesburg, MS
Monday, May 12; 2:00 PM CDT; Game 1	WP: Will Anderson (7–1); Sv: James Brock (3)	Boxscore	LP: Evan Foor (13–2)	Milton Wheeler Field, Hattiesburg, MS
Monday, May 12; 2:00 PM CDT; Game 1	HR: Jonny McGill (17)	Boxscore	HR: Connor Hickey (18)	Milton Wheeler Field, Hattiesburg, MS

Monday, May 12; 6:00 PM CDT; Game 2	(4) IU–Southeast	10–6	(1) William Carey (MS)	Milton Wheeler Field, Hattiesburg, MS
Monday, May 12; 6:00 PM CDT; Game 2	WP: Luca Sandrella (7–2); Sv: Aiden Darlage (1)	Boxscore	LP: Matthew Davis	Milton Wheeler Field, Hattiesburg, MS
Monday, May 12; 6:00 PM CDT; Game 2		Boxscore	HR: Jayden Mark (5)	Milton Wheeler Field, Hattiesburg, MS

Tuesday, May 13; 2:00 PM CDT; Game 3	(2) Oklahoma Wesleyan	16–11	(1) William Carey (MS)	Milton Wheeler Field, Hattiesburg, MS
Tuesday, May 13; 2:00 PM CDT; Game 3	WP: Michael Mendonza (11–2)	Boxscore	LP: Bobby Magee (7–2)	Milton Wheeler Field, Hattiesburg, MS
Tuesday, May 13; 2:00 PM CDT; Game 3		Boxscore	HR: Cam Trosclair (6)	Milton Wheeler Field, Hattiesburg, MS

Tuesday, May 13; 6:00 PM CDT; Game 4	(4) IU–Southeast	4–14 (F/7)	(3) British Columbia	Milton Wheeler Field, Hattiesburg, MS; Umpires: HP: Ryan McCraney, 1B: Blake Thames, 2B: Eric Becnel, 3B: Mark Humphreys
Tuesday, May 13; 6:00 PM CDT; Game 4	LP: Brendan Whalen (6–3)	Boxscore	WP: Evan Hoegler (2–1)	Milton Wheeler Field, Hattiesburg, MS; Umpires: HP: Ryan McCraney, 1B: Blake Thames, 2B: Eric Becnel, 3B: Mark Humphreys
Tuesday, May 13; 6:00 PM CDT; Game 4		Boxscore	HR: Kaden Zarowny (10)	Milton Wheeler Field, Hattiesburg, MS; Umpires: HP: Ryan McCraney, 1B: Blake Thames, 2B: Eric Becnel, 3B: Mark Humphreys

Wednesday, May 14; 2:00 PM CDT; Game 5	(2) Oklahoma Wesleyan	8–14	(4) IU–Southeast	Milton Wheeler Field, Hattiesburg, MS
Wednesday, May 14; 2:00 PM CDT; Game 5	LP: Tyler Benefiel (0–1)	Boxscore	WP: Zak Rasener (3–1)	Milton Wheeler Field, Hattiesburg, MS
Wednesday, May 14; 2:00 PM CDT; Game 5	HR: Javier Marcial (15), Luis Antigua (9)	Boxscore		Milton Wheeler Field, Hattiesburg, MS

Wednesday, May 14; 6:00 PM CDT; Game 6	(3) British Columbia	7–4 (F/11)	(4) IU–Southeast	Milton Wheeler Field, Hattiesburg, MS
Wednesday, May 14; 6:00 PM CDT; Game 6	WP: Evan Hoegler (3–1); Sv: Ryan Beitel (1)	Boxscore	LP: Daly Skees (0–1)	Milton Wheeler Field, Hattiesburg, MS

=== Kingsport Bracket ===
Hosted by Visit Kingsport at Hunter Wright Stadium

==== Bracket ====
First round
4	Indiana Tech	8
5	Louisiana Christian	2
First round
5	Louisiana Christian	0
2	Cumberland (TN)	10

Second round
1	Tennessee Wesleyan	8
4	Indiana Tech	1
2	Cumberland (TN)	1
3	Columbia (MO)	5
Second round
4	Indiana Tech	3
2	Cumberland (TN)	8

Semifinals
1	Tennessee Wesleyan	2
3	Columbia (MO)	7
Semifinals
1	Tennessee Wesleyan	14
2	Cumberland (TN)	12

Finals
3	Columbia (MO)	5	1
1	Tennessee Wesleyan	6	18

==== Results ====
Monday, May 12; 11:30 AM EDT; Game 1	(5) Louisiana Christian	2–8	(4) Indiana Tech	Hunter Wright Stadium; Attendance: 123
Monday, May 12; 11:30 AM EDT; Game 1	LP: Coleman Haltom (6–2)	Boxscore	WP: Adam Besser (6-3)	Hunter Wright Stadium; Attendance: 123

Tuesday, May 13 (Note: Postponed from May 12 due to rain.); 10:00 AM EDT; Game 2	(3) Columbia (MO)	5–1	(2) Cumberland (TN)	Hunter Wright Stadium; Attendance: 115
Tuesday, May 13; 10:00 AM EDT; Game 2	WP: Owen Clark (9–0)	Boxscore	LP: Justin Goldstein (7–5)	Hunter Wright Stadium; Attendance: 115
Tuesday, May 13; 10:00 AM EDT; Game 2	HR: Brayden McGinnis (20), Zac Fruend (11)	Boxscore		Hunter Wright Stadium; Attendance: 115

Tuesday, May 13; 1:30 PM EDT; Game 3	(4) Indiana Tech	1–8	(1) Tennessee Wesleyan	Hunter Wright Stadium; Attendance: 120
Tuesday, May 13; 1:30 PM EDT; Game 3	LP: Grant Besser (6–2)	Boxscore	WP: Blake Peyton (7–1)	Hunter Wright Stadium; Attendance: 120
Tuesday, May 13; 1:30 PM EDT; Game 3	HR: Jordan Malott (12)	Boxscore	HR: Brayan Espinoza (6)	Hunter Wright Stadium; Attendance: 120

Tuesday, May 13; 7:30 PM EDT; Game 4	(2) Cumberland (TN)	10–0	(5) Louisiana Christian	Hunter Wright Stadium; Attendance: 125
Tuesday, May 13; 7:30 PM EDT; Game 4	WP: Carter Rost (10–0)	Boxscore	LP: Jacob Bareswill (6–3)	Hunter Wright Stadium; Attendance: 125
Tuesday, May 13; 7:30 PM EDT; Game 4	HR: Preston Welchel 2 (12)	Boxscore		Hunter Wright Stadium; Attendance: 125

Wednesday, May 14 (Note: Pushed back one day due to rain.); 10:00 AM EDT; Game 5	(1) Tennessee Wesleyan	2–7	(3) Columbia (MO)	Hunter Wright Stadium; Attendance: 111
Wednesday, May 14; 10:00 AM EDT; Game 5	LP: Daniel Batcher (11–2)	Boxscore	WP: Layne Rutherford (7–3)	Hunter Wright Stadium; Attendance: 111
Wednesday, May 14; 10:00 AM EDT; Game 5	HR: Nick Collins (3)	Boxscore		Hunter Wright Stadium; Attendance: 111

Wednesday, May 14; 1:30 PM EDT; Game 6	(2) Cumberland (TN)	8–3	(4) Indiana Tech	Hunter Wright Stadium; Attendance: 117
Wednesday, May 14; 1:30 PM EDT; Game 6	WP: Quinlan Wiley (8–2); Sv: Kyle Nyblod (6)	Boxscore	LP: Coley Stevens (5–3)	Hunter Wright Stadium; Attendance: 117
Wednesday, May 14; 1:30 PM EDT; Game 6	HR: Preston Welchel (13)	Boxscore	HR: Jordan Malott 2 (14), Jack Ferguson (11)	Hunter Wright Stadium; Attendance: 117

Wednesday, May 14; 5:00 PM EDT; Game 7	(1) Tennessee Wesleyan	14–12	(2) Cumberland (TN)	Hunter Wright Stadium; Attendance: 135
Wednesday, May 14; 5:00 PM EDT; Game 7	WP: Wes Butler (1–1); Sv: Cameron Goffar (1)	Boxscore	LP: Grayson Cole (2–2)	Hunter Wright Stadium; Attendance: 135
Wednesday, May 14; 5:00 PM EDT; Game 7		Boxscore	HR: Toshiki Kuriya (9), Javier Beal (2)	Hunter Wright Stadium; Attendance: 135

Thursday, May 15; 11:00 AM EDT; Game 8	(3) Columbia (MO)	5–6	(1) Tennessee Wesleyan	Hunter Wright Stadium; Attendance: 135
Thursday, May 15; 11:00 AM EDT; Game 8	LP: Pierce Hartmann (8–3)	Boxscore	WP: Justin Jackson (6–1); Sv: Cameron Goffar (2)	Hunter Wright Stadium; Attendance: 135
Thursday, May 15; 11:00 AM EDT; Game 8		Boxscore	HR: Brayan Espinoza (7), Kruise Newman (13)	Hunter Wright Stadium; Attendance: 135

Thursday, May 15; 2:30 PM EDT; Game 9	(1) Tennessee Wesleyan	18–1	(3) Columbia (MO)	Hunter Wright Stadium; Attendance: 167
Thursday, May 15; 2:30 PM EDT; Game 9	WP: Julian Berinti (4–1)	Boxscore	LP: Kam Dohogne (5–2)	Hunter Wright Stadium; Attendance: 167

=== Lakeland Bracket ===
Hosted by Southeastern University at Ted A. Broer Stadium

==== Bracket ====
First round
4	Abraham Baldwin (GA)	4
5	Briar Cliff (IA)	8
First round
4	Abraham Baldwin (GA)	12^{8}
2	Central Methodist (MO)	2

Second round
1	Southeastern (FL)	6
5	Briar Cliff (IA)	2
2	Central Methodist (MO)	8
3	Arizona Christian	9
Second round
5	Briar Cliff (IA)	5
4	Abraham Baldwin (GA)	9

Semifinals
1	Southeastern (FL)	8
3	Arizona Christian	5
Semifinals
3	Arizona Christian	5
4	Abraham Baldwin (GA)	6

Finals
1	Southeastern (FL)	10	–
4	Abraham Baldwin (GA)	4	–

==== Results ====
Monday, May 12; 7:00 PM EDT; Game 1	(5) Briar Cliff (IA)	8–4	(4) Abraham Baldwin (GA)	Ted A. Broer Stadium, Lakeland, FL; Umpires: HP: Randy Benhart, 1B: Brian Barnard, 2B: Shane Leboyd, 3B: Garlos Galarza
Monday, May 12; 7:00 PM EDT; Game 1	WP: Johnny Reed (6–1)	Boxscore	LP: Owen Lamb (5–1)	Ted A. Broer Stadium, Lakeland, FL; Umpires: HP: Randy Benhart, 1B: Brian Barnard, 2B: Shane Leboyd, 3B: Garlos Galarza
Monday, May 12; 7:00 PM EDT; Game 1	HR: Nico Sall (15)	Boxscore	HR: Quinten Rawls (6)	Ted A. Broer Stadium, Lakeland, FL; Umpires: HP: Randy Benhart, 1B: Brian Barnard, 2B: Shane Leboyd, 3B: Garlos Galarza

Tuesday, May 13; 11:00 AM EDT; Game 2	(3) Arizona Christian	9–8	(2) Central Methodist (MO)	Ted A. Broer Stadium, Lakeland, FL; Umpires: HP: Casey Sanchez, 1B: Adam Benhart, 2B: Stacey Dunbar, 3B: Chay Stout
Tuesday, May 13; 11:00 AM EDT; Game 2	WP: Payton Robertson (5–1); Sv: Jackson Hohensee (12)	Boxscore	LP: Foster Seitz (11–4)	Ted A. Broer Stadium, Lakeland, FL; Umpires: HP: Casey Sanchez, 1B: Adam Benhart, 2B: Stacey Dunbar, 3B: Chay Stout
Tuesday, May 13; 11:00 AM EDT; Game 2	HR: Kane Kiaunis (14), Kimo Fukofuka (6)	Boxscore	HR: Dominick Proctor (2)	Ted A. Broer Stadium, Lakeland, FL; Umpires: HP: Casey Sanchez, 1B: Adam Benhart, 2B: Stacey Dunbar, 3B: Chay Stout

Tuesday, May 13; 2:30 PM EDT; Game 3	(5) Briar Cliff (IA)	2–6	(1) Southeastern (FL)	Ted A. Broer Stadium, Lakeland, FL; Umpires: HP: Randy Benhart, 1B: Shane Leboyd, 2B: Carlos Galarza, 3B: Brian Barnard
Tuesday, May 13; 2:30 PM EDT; Game 3	LP: Cade Nelson (5–4)	Boxscore	WP: Reece Wissinger (8–0)	Ted A. Broer Stadium, Lakeland, FL; Umpires: HP: Randy Benhart, 1B: Shane Leboyd, 2B: Carlos Galarza, 3B: Brian Barnard
Tuesday, May 13; 2:30 PM EDT; Game 3	HR: Nico Sall (16)	Boxscore	HR: Alfonso Villalobos (14)	Ted A. Broer Stadium, Lakeland, FL; Umpires: HP: Randy Benhart, 1B: Shane Leboyd, 2B: Carlos Galarza, 3B: Brian Barnard

Tuesday, May 13; 6:00 PM EDT; Game 4	(4) Abraham Baldwin (GA)	12–2 (F/8)	(2) Central Methodist (MO)	Ted A. Broer Stadium, Lakeland, FL; Umpires: HP: Casey Sanchez, 1B: Adam Benhart, 2B: Stacy Dunbar, 3B: Chay Stout
Tuesday, May 13; 6:00 PM EDT; Game 4	WP: Trypp Lumpkin (5–4)	Boxscore	LP: Cesar Morales (6–3)	Ted A. Broer Stadium, Lakeland, FL; Umpires: HP: Casey Sanchez, 1B: Adam Benhart, 2B: Stacy Dunbar, 3B: Chay Stout
Tuesday, May 13; 6:00 PM EDT; Game 4	HR: Dylan Davis (3)	Boxscore		Ted A. Broer Stadium, Lakeland, FL; Umpires: HP: Casey Sanchez, 1B: Adam Benhart, 2B: Stacy Dunbar, 3B: Chay Stout

Wednesday, May 14; 11:00 AM EDT; Game 5	(1) Southeastern (FL)	8–5	(3) Arizona Christian	Ted A. Broer Stadium, Lakeland, FL; Umpires: HP: Carlos Galarza, 1B: Shane Leboyd, 2B: Bryan Barnard, 3B: Randy Benhart
Wednesday, May 14; 11:00 AM EDT; Game 5	WP: Aaron Robertson (10–2); Sv: Cole Jones (11)	Boxscore	LP: Trey Tarver (5–3)	Ted A. Broer Stadium, Lakeland, FL; Umpires: HP: Carlos Galarza, 1B: Shane Leboyd, 2B: Bryan Barnard, 3B: Randy Benhart
Wednesday, May 14; 11:00 AM EDT; Game 5		Boxscore	HR: Kane Kiaunis (15)	Ted A. Broer Stadium, Lakeland, FL; Umpires: HP: Carlos Galarza, 1B: Shane Leboyd, 2B: Bryan Barnard, 3B: Randy Benhart

Wednesday, May 14; 2:30 PM EDT; Game 6	(4) Abraham Baldwin (GA)	9–5	(5) Briar Cliff (IA)	Ted A. Broer Stadium, Lakeland, FL; Umpires: HP: Chase Stout, 1B: Casey Sanchez, 2B: Adam Benhart, 3B: Stacy Dunbar
Wednesday, May 14; 2:30 PM EDT; Game 6	WP: Reigh Jordan (8–3)	Boxscore	LP: Carter Schorg (5–5)	Ted A. Broer Stadium, Lakeland, FL; Umpires: HP: Chase Stout, 1B: Casey Sanchez, 2B: Adam Benhart, 3B: Stacy Dunbar

Wednesday, May 14; 6:00 PM EDT; Game 7	(3) Arizona Christian	5–6	(4) Abraham Baldwin (GA)	Ted A. Broer Stadium, Lakeland, FL; Umpires: HP: Shane Leboyd, 1B: Randy Benhart, 2B: Carlos Galarza, 3B: Brian Barnard
Wednesday, May 14; 6:00 PM EDT; Game 7	LP: Jackson Hohensee (1–3)	Boxscore	WP: Nicholas Milbrant (4–0); Sv: Lalan Ellis (7)	Ted A. Broer Stadium, Lakeland, FL; Umpires: HP: Shane Leboyd, 1B: Randy Benhart, 2B: Carlos Galarza, 3B: Brian Barnard

Thursday, May 15; 11:00 AM EDT; Game 8	(4) Abraham Baldwin (GA)	4–10	(1) Southeastern (FL)	Ted A. Broer Stadium, Lakeland, FL; Umpires: HP: Casey Sanchez, 1B: Stacey Dunbar, 2B: Chay Stout, 3B: Adam Benhart
Thursday, May 15; 11:00 AM EDT; Game 8	LP: Kade Haywood (6–7)	Boxscore	WP: Andrew Hansen (3–1)	Ted A. Broer Stadium, Lakeland, FL; Umpires: HP: Casey Sanchez, 1B: Stacey Dunbar, 2B: Chay Stout, 3B: Adam Benhart
Thursday, May 15; 11:00 AM EDT; Game 8	HR: Cameron Campbell (2), Dylan Davis (4)	Boxscore	HR: Connor Hicks (12), James Strom (6), David Castillo (4)	Ted A. Broer Stadium, Lakeland, FL; Umpires: HP: Casey Sanchez, 1B: Stacey Dunbar, 2B: Chay Stout, 3B: Adam Benhart

=== Lawrenceville Bracket ===
Hosted by Georgia Gwinnett College at Grizzly Baseball Complex

==== Bracket ====
First round
4	Talladega (AL)	13^{7}
5	Saint Xavier (IL)	2
First round
5	Saint Xavier (IL)	13
3	Houston-Victoria	4

Second round
1	Georgia Gwinnett	6
4	Talladega (AL)	4
2	Keiser (FL)	10
3	Houston-Victoria	9
Second round
4	Talladega (AL)	8
5	Saint Xavier (IL)	9

Semifinals
1	Georgia Gwinnett	4
2	Keiser (FL)	7
Semifinals
1	Georgia Gwinnett	16^{8}
5	Saint Xavier (IL)	5

Finals
2	Keiser (FL)	10	8
1	Georgia Gwinnett	11	13

==== Results ====
Monday, May 12; 1:00 PM EDT; Game 1	(5) Saint Xavier (IL)	2–13 (F/7)	(4) Talladega (AL)	Grizzly Baseball Complex, Lawrenceville, GA; Attendance: 112; Umpires: HP: Dan Barry, 1B: John Walrath, 2B: Mike Presto, 3B: Russ Nelson
Monday, May 12; 1:00 PM EDT; Game 1	LP: Jimmy Fairley (10–2)	Boxscore	WP: Diego Duque (11–2)	Grizzly Baseball Complex, Lawrenceville, GA; Attendance: 112; Umpires: HP: Dan Barry, 1B: John Walrath, 2B: Mike Presto, 3B: Russ Nelson
Monday, May 12; 1:00 PM EDT; Game 1	HR: Gabe Kirck (17), Noah Dreier (9)	Boxscore	HR: Miguel Oropeza (16), Armando Jackson (10)	Grizzly Baseball Complex, Lawrenceville, GA; Attendance: 112; Umpires: HP: Dan Barry, 1B: John Walrath, 2B: Mike Presto, 3B: Russ Nelson

Monday, May 12; 5:30 PM EDT; Game 2	(3) Houston-Victoria	9–10	(2) Keiser (FL)	Grizzly Baseball Complex, Lawrenceville, GA; Attendance: 116; Umpires: HP: Jackie Halstad, 1B: Patrick Gentry, 2B: Nicholas Plutik, 3B: Craig Hammer
Monday, May 12; 5:30 PM EDT; Game 2	LP: Jacob Baker (0–3)	Boxscore	WP: Tanner Goswick (3–1)	Grizzly Baseball Complex, Lawrenceville, GA; Attendance: 116; Umpires: HP: Jackie Halstad, 1B: Patrick Gentry, 2B: Nicholas Plutik, 3B: Craig Hammer
Monday, May 12; 5:30 PM EDT; Game 2		Boxscore	HR: Simon Grinberg (18)	Grizzly Baseball Complex, Lawrenceville, GA; Attendance: 116; Umpires: HP: Jackie Halstad, 1B: Patrick Gentry, 2B: Nicholas Plutik, 3B: Craig Hammer

Tuesday, May 13; 1:00 PM EDT; Game 3	(4) Talladega (AL)	4–6	(1) Georgia Gwinnett	Grizzly Baseball Complex, Lawrenceville, GA; Attendance: 184; Umpires: HP: Nicholas Plutik, 1B: Dan Barry, 2B: Craig Hammer, 3B: Mike Presto
Tuesday, May 13; 1:00 PM EDT; Game 3	LP: Samuel Guadamuz (11–2)	Boxscore	WP: Ben Harris (11–0); Sv: Tyler E. Martin (4)	Grizzly Baseball Complex, Lawrenceville, GA; Attendance: 184; Umpires: HP: Nicholas Plutik, 1B: Dan Barry, 2B: Craig Hammer, 3B: Mike Presto
Tuesday, May 13; 1:00 PM EDT; Game 3	HR: Miguel Oropeza (17)	Boxscore	HR: Jon Ponder (7)	Grizzly Baseball Complex, Lawrenceville, GA; Attendance: 184; Umpires: HP: Nicholas Plutik, 1B: Dan Barry, 2B: Craig Hammer, 3B: Mike Presto

Tuesday, May 13; 4:30 PM EDT; Game 4	(5) Saint Xavier (IL)	13–4	(3) Houston-Victoria	Grizzly Baseball Complex, Lawrenceville, GA; Umpires: HP: Patrick Gentry, 1B: Mike Presto, 2B: Gary Hammer, 3B: Jackie Halstead
Tuesday, May 13; 4:30 PM EDT; Game 4	WP: Logan McCleery (9–4); Sv: Noah Scott (2)	Boxscore	LP: Brady Parker (8–3)	Grizzly Baseball Complex, Lawrenceville, GA; Umpires: HP: Patrick Gentry, 1B: Mike Presto, 2B: Gary Hammer, 3B: Jackie Halstead

Wednesday, May 14; 11:00 AM EDT; Game 5	(1) Georgia Gwinnett	4–7	(2) Keiser (FL)	Grizzly Baseball Complex, Lawrenceville, GA; Attendance: 112; Umpires: HP: Patrick Gentry, 1B: Nicholas Plutik, 2B: Craig Hammer, 3B: Jackie Halstead
Wednesday, May 14; 11:00 AM EDT; Game 5	LP: Anthony Patterson III (6–3)	Boxscore	WP: Jake Molloy (3–0); Sv: Tanner Goswick (5)	Grizzly Baseball Complex, Lawrenceville, GA; Attendance: 112; Umpires: HP: Patrick Gentry, 1B: Nicholas Plutik, 2B: Craig Hammer, 3B: Jackie Halstead
Wednesday, May 14; 11:00 AM EDT; Game 5	HR: Scott Seeker (11)	Boxscore		Grizzly Baseball Complex, Lawrenceville, GA; Attendance: 112; Umpires: HP: Patrick Gentry, 1B: Nicholas Plutik, 2B: Craig Hammer, 3B: Jackie Halstead

Wednesday, May 14; 3:00 PM EDT; Game 6	(4) Talladega (AL)	8–9	(5) Saint Xavier (IL)	Grizzly Baseball Complex, Lawrenceville, GA; Attendance: 82; Umpires: HP: Craig Trussell, 1B: Jackie Halstead, 2B: Patrick Gentry, 3B: Nicholas Plutik
Wednesday, May 14; 3:00 PM EDT; Game 6	LP: Christian Delgado (5–1)	Boxscore	WP: Noah Scott (2–2)	Grizzly Baseball Complex, Lawrenceville, GA; Attendance: 82; Umpires: HP: Craig Trussell, 1B: Jackie Halstead, 2B: Patrick Gentry, 3B: Nicholas Plutik

Wednesday, May 14; 7:00 PM EDT; Game 7	(1) Georgia Gwinnett	16–5 (F/8)	(5) Saint Xavier (IL)	Grizzly Baseball Complex, Lawrenceville, GA; Attendance: 124; Umpires: HP: Patrick Gentry, 1B: Nicholas Plutik, 2B: Craig Hammer, 3B: Jackie Halstead
Wednesday, May 14; 7:00 PM EDT; Game 7	WP: Austin Testerman (6–1)	Boxscore	LP: Noah Dreier (4–5)	Grizzly Baseball Complex, Lawrenceville, GA; Attendance: 124; Umpires: HP: Patrick Gentry, 1B: Nicholas Plutik, 2B: Craig Hammer, 3B: Jackie Halstead

Thursday, May 15; 11:00 AM EDT; Game 8	(2) Keiser (FL)	10–11	(1) Georgia Gwinnett	Grizzly Baseball Complex, Lawrenceville, GA; Attendance: 192; Umpires: HP: Russ Nelson, 1B: Jackie Halstead, 2B: Nicholas Plutik, 3B: Dan Barry
Thursday, May 15; 11:00 AM EDT; Game 8	LP: Tanner Goswick (3–2)	Boxscore	WP: Shane Anderson (4–1)	Grizzly Baseball Complex, Lawrenceville, GA; Attendance: 192; Umpires: HP: Russ Nelson, 1B: Jackie Halstead, 2B: Nicholas Plutik, 3B: Dan Barry
Thursday, May 15; 11:00 AM EDT; Game 8		Boxscore	HR: Scott Seeker (12)	Grizzly Baseball Complex, Lawrenceville, GA; Attendance: 192; Umpires: HP: Russ Nelson, 1B: Jackie Halstead, 2B: Nicholas Plutik, 3B: Dan Barry

Thursday, May 15; 3:00 PM EDT; Game 9	(2) Keiser (FL)	8–13	(1) Georgia Gwinnett	Grizzly Baseball Complex, Lawrenceville, GA; Attendance: 188; Umpires: HP: Mike Presto, 1B: Russ Nelson, 2B: Dan Barry, 3B: John Walrath
Thursday, May 15; 3:00 PM EDT; Game 9	LP: Noah Eatman (2–3)	Boxscore	WP: Wyatt Dodgens (9–0)	Grizzly Baseball Complex, Lawrenceville, GA; Attendance: 188; Umpires: HP: Mike Presto, 1B: Russ Nelson, 2B: Dan Barry, 3B: John Walrath
Thursday, May 15; 3:00 PM EDT; Game 9	HR: Matthew Nichols (1)	Boxscore	HR: Jon Ponder (8), Paul Winland Jr. 2 (8), Kyle Norton (1)	Grizzly Baseball Complex, Lawrenceville, GA; Attendance: 188; Umpires: HP: Mike Presto, 1B: Russ Nelson, 2B: Dan Barry, 3B: John Walrath

=== Lewiston Bracket ===
Hosted by Lewis-Clark State College at Harris Field

==== Bracket ====
First round
4	Oregon Tech	4
5	Dickinson State (ND)	2
First round
5	Dickinson State (ND)	4
2	Wayland Baptist (TX)	12

Second round
1	Hope International (CA)	3
4	Oregon Tech	2
2	Wayland Baptist (TX)	1
3	Lewis-Clark State (ID)	9
Second round
4	Oregon Tech	6
2	Wayland Baptist (TX)	7

Semifinals
1	Hope International (CA)	12^{7}
3	Lewis-Clark State (ID)	1
Semifinals
3	Lewis-Clark State (ID)	6
2	Wayland Baptist (TX)	7

Finals
1	Hope International (CA)	12	–
2	Wayland Baptist (TX)	4	–

==== Results ====
Monday, May 12; 11:00 AM PDT; Game 1	(5) Dickinson State (ND)	2–4	(4) Oregon Tech	Harris Field; Attendance: 140; Umpires: HP: Steve Sillers, 1B: Travis Schatzman, 2B: Daniel Clemens, 3B: Brad Magee
Monday, May 12; 11:00 AM PDT; Game 1	LP: Jacob Scully (7–6)	Boxscore	WP: Tim Williams (8–1); Sv: Kaden Melzer (4)	Harris Field; Attendance: 140; Umpires: HP: Steve Sillers, 1B: Travis Schatzman, 2B: Daniel Clemens, 3B: Brad Magee
Monday, May 12; 11:00 AM PDT; Game 1	HR: Cameron Erickson (4)	Boxscore	HR: Garrett Smith (3)	Harris Field; Attendance: 140; Umpires: HP: Steve Sillers, 1B: Travis Schatzman, 2B: Daniel Clemens, 3B: Brad Magee

Monday, May 12; 3:00 PM PDT; Game 2	(3) Lewis-Clark State (ID)	9–1	(2) Wayland Baptist (TX)	Harris Field; Attendance: 315; Umpires: HP: Jim Clifford, 1B: Daniel Clemens, 2B: Pat Zink, 3B: Brad Magee
Monday, May 12; 3:00 PM PDT; Game 2	WP: Evan Canfield (6–2); Sv: Jace Taylor (2)	Boxscore	LP: Tyson Potts (5–5)	Harris Field; Attendance: 315; Umpires: HP: Jim Clifford, 1B: Daniel Clemens, 2B: Pat Zink, 3B: Brad Magee
Monday, May 12; 3:00 PM PDT; Game 2	HR: Jack Sheward (12), Jakob Marquez (12), Dominic Signorelli (11)	Boxscore	HR: Sinclair Pimentel (4)	Harris Field; Attendance: 315; Umpires: HP: Jim Clifford, 1B: Daniel Clemens, 2B: Pat Zink, 3B: Brad Magee

Monday, May 12; 6:00 PM PDT; Game 3	(4) Oregon Tech	2–3	(1) Hope International (CA)	Harris Field; Attendance: 120; Umpires: HP: Travis Schatzman, 1B: Pat Zink, 2B: Brad Magee, 3B: Jim Clifford
Monday, May 12; 6:00 PM PDT; Game 3	LP: Bronson Chapple (4–2)	Boxscore	WP: Trey Seeley (12–1)	Harris Field; Attendance: 120; Umpires: HP: Travis Schatzman, 1B: Pat Zink, 2B: Brad Magee, 3B: Jim Clifford
Monday, May 12; 6:00 PM PDT; Game 3	HR: Julien Jones (15)	Boxscore		Harris Field; Attendance: 120; Umpires: HP: Travis Schatzman, 1B: Pat Zink, 2B: Brad Magee, 3B: Jim Clifford

Tuesday, May 13; 11:00 AM PDT; Game 4	(2) Wayland Baptist (TX)	12–4	(5) Dickinson State (ND)	Harris Field; Attendance: 115; Umpires: HP: Daniel Clemens, 1B: Brad Magee, 2B: Steve Sillers, 3B: Travis Schatzman
Tuesday, May 13; 11:00 AM PDT; Game 4	WP: Branin Seibert (7–2)	Boxscore	LP: Carlos Molina Jr. (1–2)	Harris Field; Attendance: 115; Umpires: HP: Daniel Clemens, 1B: Brad Magee, 2B: Steve Sillers, 3B: Travis Schatzman
Tuesday, May 13; 11:00 AM PDT; Game 4	HR: Sinclair Pimentel (5)	Boxscore		Harris Field; Attendance: 115; Umpires: HP: Daniel Clemens, 1B: Brad Magee, 2B: Steve Sillers, 3B: Travis Schatzman

Tuesday, May 13; 2:30 PM PDT; Game 5	(1) Hope International (CA)	12–1 (F/7)	(3) Lewis-Clark State (ID)	Harris Field; Attendance: 210; Umpires: HP: Pat Zink, 1B: Steve Sillers, 2B: Jim Clifford, 3B: Daniel Clemens
Tuesday, May 13; 2:30 PM PDT; Game 5	WP: Josh Landry (11–0)	Boxscore	LP: Jantzen Lucas (7–2)	Harris Field; Attendance: 210; Umpires: HP: Pat Zink, 1B: Steve Sillers, 2B: Jim Clifford, 3B: Daniel Clemens
Tuesday, May 13; 2:30 PM PDT; Game 5	HR: Trotter Boston (11), Mario Tostado (10)	Boxscore		Harris Field; Attendance: 210; Umpires: HP: Pat Zink, 1B: Steve Sillers, 2B: Jim Clifford, 3B: Daniel Clemens

Tuesday, May 13; 6:00 PM PDT; Game 6	(2) Wayland Baptist (TX)	7–6	(4) Oregon Tech	Harris Field; Umpires: HP: Brad Magee, 1B: Jim Clifford, 2B: Travis Schatzman, 3B: Pat Zink
Tuesday, May 13; 6:00 PM PDT; Game 6	WP: Felix Polanco (6–4); Sv: Juan Gil-Franco (3)	Boxscore	LP: Carson Glavich (7–2)	Harris Field; Umpires: HP: Brad Magee, 1B: Jim Clifford, 2B: Travis Schatzman, 3B: Pat Zink
Tuesday, May 13; 6:00 PM PDT; Game 6	HR: Delvis Claudio (19), Felix Polanco (17), Samuel Fabian (24), Brayden Peyton (9)	Boxscore		Harris Field; Umpires: HP: Brad Magee, 1B: Jim Clifford, 2B: Travis Schatzman, 3B: Pat Zink

Wednesday, May 14; 2:30 PM PDT; Game 7	(3) Lewis-Clark State (ID)	6–7	(2) Wayland Baptist (TX)	Harris Field; Attendance: 290; Umpires: HP: Steve Sillers, 1B: Travis Schatzman, 2B: Daniel Clemens, 3B: Brad Magee
Wednesday, May 14; 2:30 PM PDT; Game 7	LP: Kolby Solomon (3–2)	Boxscore	WP: Jose Escamilla (2–0)	Harris Field; Attendance: 290; Umpires: HP: Steve Sillers, 1B: Travis Schatzman, 2B: Daniel Clemens, 3B: Brad Magee
Wednesday, May 14; 2:30 PM PDT; Game 7	HR: Izzy Madariaga (4)	Boxscore	HR: Delvis Claudio (20), Samuel Fabian (25)	Harris Field; Attendance: 290; Umpires: HP: Steve Sillers, 1B: Travis Schatzman, 2B: Daniel Clemens, 3B: Brad Magee

Wednesday, May 14; 6:00 PM PDT; Game 8	(2) Wayland Baptist (TX)	4–12	(1) Hope International (CA)	Harris Field; Attendance: 115; Umpires: HP: Jim Clifford, 1B: Daniel Clemens, 2B: Pat Zink, 3B: Steve Sillers
Wednesday, May 14; 6:00 PM PDT; Game 8	LP: Tate House (2–2)	Boxscore	WP: Gio Besio (2–0)	Harris Field; Attendance: 115; Umpires: HP: Jim Clifford, 1B: Daniel Clemens, 2B: Pat Zink, 3B: Steve Sillers
Wednesday, May 14; 6:00 PM PDT; Game 8	HR: Samuel Fabian 2 (27)	Boxscore		Harris Field; Attendance: 115; Umpires: HP: Jim Clifford, 1B: Daniel Clemens, 2B: Pat Zink, 3B: Steve Sillers

=== Lincoln Bracket ===
Hosted by Concordia University Nebraska at Sherman Field

==== Bracket ====
First round
4	Indiana Wesleyan	3
5	Mount Mercy (IA)	0
First round
5	Mount Mercy (IA)	3
3	Science & Arts (OK)	6

Second round
1	Webber International (FL)	5
4	Indiana Wesleyan	4
2	Concordia (NE)	5
3	Science & Arts (OK)	4
Second round
4	Indiana Wesleyan	11
3	Science & Arts (OK)	9

Semifinals
1	Webber International (FL)	3
2	Concordia (NE)	0
Semifinals
2	Concordia (NE)	7
4	Indiana Wesleyan	8^{16}

Finals
1	Webber International (FL)	11	–
4	Indiana Wesleyan	1	–

==== Results ====
Monday, May 12; 11:00 AM CDT; Game 1	(5) Mount Mercy (IA)	0–3	(4) Indiana Wesleyan	Sherman Field, Lincoln, NE; Attendance: 350; Umpires: HP: Allen Stekl, 1B: Sean Johnston, 2B: Jason Seitz, 3B: Michael Andrick
Monday, May 12; 11:00 AM CDT; Game 1	LP: Ashton Schwab (4–4)	Boxscore	WP: Brock Buckley (10–3)	Sherman Field, Lincoln, NE; Attendance: 350; Umpires: HP: Allen Stekl, 1B: Sean Johnston, 2B: Jason Seitz, 3B: Michael Andrick
Monday, May 12; 11:00 AM CDT; Game 1		Boxscore	HR: Nick Wiley (15)	Sherman Field, Lincoln, NE; Attendance: 350; Umpires: HP: Allen Stekl, 1B: Sean Johnston, 2B: Jason Seitz, 3B: Michael Andrick

Monday, May 12; 3:00 PM CDT; Game 2	(3) Science & Arts (OK)	4–5	(2) Concordia (NE)	Sherman Field, Lincoln, NE; Attendance: 575; Umpires: HP: John Thayer, 1B: Jason Seitz, 2B: Michael Andrick, 3B: Ryan Storck
Monday, May 12; 3:00 PM CDT; Game 2	LP: Rob Schmidt (3–3)	Boxscore	WP: Daiten Schmidt (2–1)	Sherman Field, Lincoln, NE; Attendance: 575; Umpires: HP: John Thayer, 1B: Jason Seitz, 2B: Michael Andrick, 3B: Ryan Storck

Monday, May 12; 7:00 PM CDT; Game 3	(4) Indiana Wesleyan	4–5	(1) Webber International (FL)	Sherman Field, Lincoln, NE; Attendance: 300; Umpires: HP: Sean Johnston, 1B: John Thayer, 2B: Ryan Storck, 3B: Allen Stekl
Monday, May 12; 7:00 PM CDT; Game 3	LP: Cam Lafuze (1–4)	Boxscore	WP: Jacob Hardy (5–1); Sv: Noah Palmese (12)	Sherman Field, Lincoln, NE; Attendance: 300; Umpires: HP: Sean Johnston, 1B: John Thayer, 2B: Ryan Storck, 3B: Allen Stekl

Tuesday, May 13; 11:00 AM CDT; Game 4	(5) Mount Mercy (IA)	3–6	(3) Science & Arts (OK)	Sherman Field, Lincoln, NE; Attendance: 275; Umpires: HP: Jason Seitz, 1B: Ryan Storck, 2B: Allen Stekl, 3B: John Thayer
Tuesday, May 13; 11:00 AM CDT; Game 4	LP: Tyler Nagelbach (7–3)	Boxscore	WP: Tyson Noel (6–4); Sv: Rob Schmidt (3)	Sherman Field, Lincoln, NE; Attendance: 275; Umpires: HP: Jason Seitz, 1B: Ryan Storck, 2B: Allen Stekl, 3B: John Thayer

Tuesday, May 13; 3:00 PM CDT; Game 5	(1) Webber International (FL)	3–0	(2) Concordia (NE)	Sherman Field, Lincoln, NE; Attendance: 575; Umpires: HP: Michael Andrick, 1B: Allen Stekl, 2B: John Thayer, 3B: Sean Johnston
Tuesday, May 13; 3:00 PM CDT; Game 5	WP: Blayne Huter (14–1); Sv: Noah Palmese (13)	Boxscore	LP: Alex Johnson (8–3)	Sherman Field, Lincoln, NE; Attendance: 575; Umpires: HP: Michael Andrick, 1B: Allen Stekl, 2B: John Thayer, 3B: Sean Johnston
Tuesday, May 13; 3:00 PM CDT; Game 5	HR: Jalen Martinez (7)	Boxscore		Sherman Field, Lincoln, NE; Attendance: 575; Umpires: HP: Michael Andrick, 1B: Allen Stekl, 2B: John Thayer, 3B: Sean Johnston

Tuesday, May 13; 7:00 PM CDT; Game 6	(3) Science & Arts (OK)	9–11	(4) Indiana Wesleyan	Sherman Field, Lincoln, NE; Attendance: 175; Umpires: HP: Ryan Storck, 1B: Michael Andrick, 2B: Sean Johnston, 3B: Jason Seitz
Tuesday, May 13; 7:00 PM CDT; Game 6	LP: Kyler Denton (4–3)	Boxscore	WP: Caleb Olsen (3–1); Sv: Cam Lafuze (6)	Sherman Field, Lincoln, NE; Attendance: 175; Umpires: HP: Ryan Storck, 1B: Michael Andrick, 2B: Sean Johnston, 3B: Jason Seitz
Tuesday, May 13; 7:00 PM CDT; Game 6	HR: Gunnar Hansen (8), Peyton McDowall (15)	Boxscore	HR: Ty Mathews (13), Nick Wiley (16)	Sherman Field, Lincoln, NE; Attendance: 175; Umpires: HP: Ryan Storck, 1B: Michael Andrick, 2B: Sean Johnston, 3B: Jason Seitz

Wednesday, May 14; 12:00 PM CDT; Game 7	(2) Concordia (NE)	7–8 (F/16)	(4) Indiana Wesleyan	Sherman Field, Lincoln, NE; Attendance: 650; Umpires: HP: Allen Stekl, 1B: John Thayer, 2B: Jason Seitz, 3B: Sean Johnston
Wednesday, May 14; 12:00 PM CDT; Game 7	LP: Seth Claybourne (3–1)	Boxscore	WP: Kevin Corcoran (4–4)	Sherman Field, Lincoln, NE; Attendance: 650; Umpires: HP: Allen Stekl, 1B: John Thayer, 2B: Jason Seitz, 3B: Sean Johnston
Wednesday, May 14; 12:00 PM CDT; Game 7	HR: Jaidan Quinn (25)	Boxscore	HR: Ty Mathews (14), Nick Wiley (14)	Sherman Field, Lincoln, NE; Attendance: 650; Umpires: HP: Allen Stekl, 1B: John Thayer, 2B: Jason Seitz, 3B: Sean Johnston

Wednesday, May 14; 4:00 PM CDT; Game 8	(4) Indiana Wesleyan	1–11	(1) Webber International (FL)	Sherman Field, Lincoln, NE; Attendance: 200; Umpires: HP: Jason Seitz, 1B: Ryan Storck, 2B: Michael Andrick, 3B: John Thayer
Wednesday, May 14; 4:00 PM CDT; Game 8	LP: Cooper Chinn (0–2)	Boxscore	WP: Dalton Robinson (6–4)	Sherman Field, Lincoln, NE; Attendance: 200; Umpires: HP: Jason Seitz, 1B: Ryan Storck, 2B: Michael Andrick, 3B: John Thayer

=== Shreveport Bracket ===
Hosted by Louisiana State University Shreveport at Pilot Field

==== Bracket ====
First round
4	Ottawa (KS)	6
5	Southern-New Orleans (LA)	0
First round
5	Southern-New Orleans (LA)	7
2	Mid-America Christian (OK)	16

Second round
1	LSU-Shreveport	5
4	Ottawa (KS)	2
2	Mid-America Christian (OK)	6
3	Johnson (TN)	13
Second round
4	Ottawa (KS)	6
2	Mid-America Christian (OK)	7

Semifinals
1	LSU-Shreveport	15
3	Johnson (TN)	4
Semifinals
3	Johnson (TN)	4
2	Mid-America Christian (OK)	16^{7}

Finals
1	LSU-Shreveport	9	–
2	Mid-America Christian (OK)	6	–

==== Results ====
Monday, May 12; 11:00 AM CDT; Game 1	(5) Southern-New Orleans (LA)	0–6	(4) Ottawa (KS)	Pilot Field, Shreveport, LA
Monday, May 12; 11:00 AM CDT; Game 1	LP: Joey Olveda (5–7)	Boxscore	WP: Ryan Wilwers (6–1)	Pilot Field, Shreveport, LA

Monday, May 12; 2:30 PM CDT; Game 2	(3) Johnson (TN)	13–6	(2) Mid-America Christian (OK)	Pilot Field, Shreveport, LA
Monday, May 12; 2:30 PM CDT; Game 2	WP: Colby Reynolds (13–2)	Boxscore	LP: Brock Cordes (6–2)	Pilot Field, Shreveport, LA
Monday, May 12; 2:30 PM CDT; Game 2	HR: Bryson Shown (8)	Boxscore	HR: Cristopher Munoz (14), Noel McGarry-Doyle (9)	Pilot Field, Shreveport, LA

Monday, May 12; 6:00 PM CDT; Game 3	(4) Ottawa (KS)	2–5	(1) LSU-Shreveport	Pilot Field, Shreveport, LA
Monday, May 12; 6:00 PM CDT; Game 3	LP: Ryan Gill (1–3)	Boxscore	WP: Isaac Rohde (13–0); Sv: Lex Meinderts (7)	Pilot Field, Shreveport, LA

Tuesday, May 13; 1:00 PM CDT; Game 4	(2) Mid-America Christian (OK)	16–7	(5) Southern-New Orleans (LA)	Pilot Field, Shreveport, LA; Attendance: 167
Tuesday, May 13; 1:00 PM CDT; Game 4	WP: Ryan Harney (1–0)	Boxscore	LP: Enrique Herazo Jr. (3–4)	Pilot Field, Shreveport, LA; Attendance: 167
Tuesday, May 13; 1:00 PM CDT; Game 4	HR: Taiga Sakuma 2 (7), Cristopher Munoz (15), Noel McGarry-Doyle 2 (11), D'Andre Gaines (14)	Boxscore	HR: Dylan Jimenez (2)	Pilot Field, Shreveport, LA; Attendance: 167

Tuesday, May 13; 4:30 PM CDT; Game 5	(1) LSU-Shreveport	15–4	(3) Johnson (TN)	Pilot Field, Shreveport, LA
Tuesday, May 13; 4:30 PM CDT; Game 5	WP: Kenneth Schechter (3–0)	Boxscore	LP: Kaleb Townsend (1–3)	Pilot Field, Shreveport, LA
Tuesday, May 13; 4:30 PM CDT; Game 5	HR: Anthony Swenda (7)	Boxscore	HR: Alonzo Zuniga (3)	Pilot Field, Shreveport, LA

Tuesday, May 13; 8:00 PM CDT; Game 6	(4) Ottawa (KS)	6–7	(2) Mid-America Christian (OK)	Pilot Field, Shreveport, LA
Tuesday, May 13; 8:00 PM CDT; Game 6	LP: Zack Melendez (5–2)	Boxscore	WP: Gabriel Dixon (6–2)	Pilot Field, Shreveport, LA
Tuesday, May 13; 8:00 PM CDT; Game 6		Boxscore	HR: Noel McGarry-Doyle (12)	Pilot Field, Shreveport, LA

Wednesday, May 14; 1:00 PM CDT; Game 7	(2) Mid-America Christian (OK)	16–4 (F/7)	(3) Johnson (TN)	Pilot Field, Shreveport, LA; Attendance: 200
Wednesday, May 14; 1:00 PM CDT; Game 7	WP: Carlos Escobosa (3–0)	Boxscore	LP: Austin Sykes (1–1)	Pilot Field, Shreveport, LA; Attendance: 200
Wednesday, May 14; 1:00 PM CDT; Game 7	HR: Cristopher Munoz (15), Noel McGarry-Doyle 2 (14), D'Andre Gaines (15)	Boxscore	HR: Travis Hobbensiefken (8)	Pilot Field, Shreveport, LA; Attendance: 200

Wednesday, May 14; 4:30 PM CDT; Game 8	(2) Mid-America Christian (OK)	6–9	(1) LSU-Shreveport	Pilot Field, Shreveport, LA
Wednesday, May 14; 4:30 PM CDT; Game 8	LP: Gabriel Dixon (6–3)	Boxscore	WP: Isaac Rohde (14–0); Sv: Brock Lucas (2)	Pilot Field, Shreveport, LA
Wednesday, May 14; 4:30 PM CDT; Game 8		Boxscore	HR: Ian Montz (5)	Pilot Field, Shreveport, LA

=== Upland Bracket ===
Hosted by Taylor University at Winterholter Field

==== Bracket ====
Upper round 1
1	Taylor (IN)	13^{7}
4	Grand View (IA)	3
3	Kansas Wesleyan	6
2	Bellevue (NE)	4
Lower round 1
4	Grand View (IA)	7
2	Bellevue (NE)	6

Semifinals
1	Taylor (IN)	5
3	Kansas Wesleyan	7
Lower final
4	Grand View (IA)	11
1	Taylor (IN)	10

Final
3	Kansas Wesleyan	3	2
4	Grand View (IA)	5	16

==== Results ====
Monday, May 12; 12:00 PM EDT; Game 1	(3) Kansas Wesleyan	6–4	(2) Bellevue (NE)	Winterholter Field, Upland, IN; Attendance: 274
Monday, May 12; 12:00 PM EDT; Game 1	WP: Brett Maddock (12–2); Sv: Ritter Steinmann (9)	Boxscore	LP: Brayden Andersen (3–1)	Winterholter Field, Upland, IN; Attendance: 274
Monday, May 12; 12:00 PM EDT; Game 1	HR: Garrett Garfield (14), Carter Allen (15), Blake Dale (7)	Boxscore	HR: Elijah Tanner (4)	Winterholter Field, Upland, IN; Attendance: 274

Monday, May 12; 4:00 PM EDT; Game 2	(4) Grand View (IA)	3–13 (F/7)	(1) Taylor (IN)	Winterholter Field, Upland, IN; Attendance: 499
Monday, May 12; 4:00 PM EDT; Game 2	LP: Kaleb Krier (8–1)	Boxscore	WP: Jake Boyer (8–2); Sv: Nathan Frady (5)	Winterholter Field, Upland, IN; Attendance: 499
Monday, May 12; 4:00 PM EDT; Game 2	HR: Hank Himrich (14)	Boxscore	HR: Ben Kennedy (7)	Winterholter Field, Upland, IN; Attendance: 499

Tuesday, May 13; 11:00 AM EDT; Game 3	(2) Bellevue (NE)	6–7	(4) Grand View (IA)	Winterholter Field, Upland, IN; Attendance: 71
Tuesday, May 13; 11:00 AM EDT; Game 3	LP: Brody Burnette (1–1)	Boxscore	WP: Evan Borst (1–0)	Winterholter Field, Upland, IN; Attendance: 71
Tuesday, May 13; 11:00 AM EDT; Game 3		Boxscore	HR: Brock Johnson (12), Hank Himrich (15)	Winterholter Field, Upland, IN; Attendance: 71

Tuesday, May 13 & Wednesday, May 14 (Note: Game 4 of the Upland Bracket between Taylor (IN) and Kansas Wesleyan was suspended due to inclement weather scoreless in the bottom of the 1st with a runner on 1st and two outs. The game resumed from that point the next day at 11:00 AM EDT.); 4:00 PM EDT; Game 4	(1) Taylor (IN)	5–7	(3) Kansas Wesleyan	Winterholter Field, Upland, IN; Attendance: 435
Tuesday, May 13 & Wednesday, May 14; 4:00 PM EDT; Game 4	LP: Gabel Pentecost (12–2)	Boxscore	WP: Nathan Righi (10–2); Sv: Ritter Steinmann (10)	Winterholter Field, Upland, IN; Attendance: 435
Tuesday, May 13 & Wednesday, May 14; 4:00 PM EDT; Game 4	HR: Brayden Manning (8), Luke Sutter (6), Ben Kennedy (8)	Boxscore	HR: Garrett Garfield (15), Fernando Ruvalcaba (18)	Winterholter Field, Upland, IN; Attendance: 435

Wednesday, May 14; 2:30 PM EDT; Game 5	(4) Grand View (IA)	11–10	(1) Taylor (IN)	Winterholter Field, Upland, IN; Attendance: 511
Wednesday, May 14; 2:30 PM EDT; Game 5	WP: Noash Kueter (3–2); Sv: Evan Borst (2)	Boxscore	LP: Dalton Swinehart (4–2)	Winterholter Field, Upland, IN; Attendance: 511
Wednesday, May 14; 2:30 PM EDT; Game 5	HR: Brock Johnson (13), Erik Broekemeier (8), Brock Rinehart (15), Carson Wadel (3)	Boxscore		Winterholter Field, Upland, IN; Attendance: 511

Thursday, May 15; 11:00 AM EDT; Game 6	(3) Kansas Wesleyan	3–5	(4) Grand View (IA)	Winterholter Field, Upland, IN; Attendance: 100
Thursday, May 15; 11:00 AM EDT; Game 6	LP: Riley Gwin (3–1)	Boxscore	WP: Logan Smith (5–1); Sv: Jacob Wolver (3)	Winterholter Field, Upland, IN; Attendance: 100
Thursday, May 15; 11:00 AM EDT; Game 6	HR: Jacob Williamson (16), Joe Finder (10)	Boxscore	HR: Brock Rinehart (16)	Winterholter Field, Upland, IN; Attendance: 100

Thursday, May 15; 2:00 PM EDT; Game 7	(4) Grand View (IA)	16–2	(3) Kansas Wesleyan	Winterholter Field, Upland, IN; Attendance: 120
Thursday, May 15; 2:00 PM EDT; Game 7	WP: Kaleb Krier (9–1); Sv: Jacob Draeger (1)	Boxscore	LP: Brett Maddock (12–3)	Winterholter Field, Upland, IN; Attendance: 120
Thursday, May 15; 2:00 PM EDT; Game 7	HR: Brock Johnson 2 (15), Evan Borst (7), Brock Rinehart 2 (18), Hank Himrich (16)	Boxscore	HR: Joe Finder (11), Eric Romero (1)	Winterholter Field, Upland, IN; Attendance: 120

=== Waleska Bracket ===
Hosted by Reinhardt University at Ken White Baseball Field

==== Bracket ====
Upper round 1
1	Reinhardt (GA)	12
4	Ave Maria (FL)	5
3	Oakland City (IN)	4
2	Loyola (LA)	7
Lower round 1
4	Ave Maria (FL)	11^{14}
3	Oakland City (IN)	9

Semifinals
1	Reinhardt (GA)	6
2	Loyola (LA)	7
Lower final
4	Ave Maria (FL)	11
1	Reinhardt (GA)	4

Final
2	Loyola (LA)	8	8
4	Ave Maria (FL)	9	4

==== Results ====
Monday, May 12; 2:00 PM EDT; Game 1	(3) Oakland City (IN)	4–7	(2) Loyola (LA)	Ken White Baseball Field, Waleska, GA; Attendance: 150
Monday, May 12; 2:00 PM EDT; Game 1	LP: Mick Uebelhor (7–4)	Boxscore	WP: Thomas Hakimian (7–1); Sv: Frank Fernandez (5)	Ken White Baseball Field, Waleska, GA; Attendance: 150
Monday, May 12; 2:00 PM EDT; Game 1	HR: Moises Rosario (9)	Boxscore	HR: Brandon Mooney (4)	Ken White Baseball Field, Waleska, GA; Attendance: 150

Monday, May 12; 6:00 PM EDT; Game 2	(4) Ave Maria (FL)	5–12	(1) Reinhardt (GA)	Ken White Baseball Field, Waleska, GA; Attendance: 200
Monday, May 12; 6:00 PM EDT; Game 2	LP: Hunter Cashero (3–9)	Boxscore	WP: Hayes Bryant (2–0)	Ken White Baseball Field, Waleska, GA; Attendance: 200
Monday, May 12; 6:00 PM EDT; Game 2		Boxscore	HR: Robert Phelps (10), Nash Crowell (17)	Ken White Baseball Field, Waleska, GA; Attendance: 200

Tuesday, May 13; 12:00 PM EDT; Game 3	(3) Oakland City (IN)	9–11 (F/14)	(4) Ave Maria (FL)	Ken White Baseball Field, Waleska, GA; Attendance: 150
Tuesday, May 13; 12:00 PM EDT; Game 3	LP: Dicky Gonzalez (4–2)	Boxscore	WP: Cameron Horner (6–2)	Ken White Baseball Field, Waleska, GA; Attendance: 150
Tuesday, May 13; 12:00 PM EDT; Game 3	HR: Marcos Arocho (7), Xander Willis (13), Moises Rosario (10)	Boxscore	HR: Jesus Gonzalez 2 (14), Dakota Jones (5)	Ken White Baseball Field, Waleska, GA; Attendance: 150

Tuesday, May 13; 4:00 PM EDT; Game 4	(1) Reinhardt (GA)	6–7	(2) Loyola (LA)	Ken White Baseball Field, Waleska, GA; Attendance: 200
Tuesday, May 13; 4:00 PM EDT; Game 4	LP: Brett Allen (4–2)	Boxscore	WP: Matthew Weil (6–0); Sv: Frank Fernandez (6)	Ken White Baseball Field, Waleska, GA; Attendance: 200
Tuesday, May 13; 4:00 PM EDT; Game 4	HR: Robert Phelps (11), Luca Boscarino (7), Louis Dion (8)	Boxscore		Ken White Baseball Field, Waleska, GA; Attendance: 200

Wednesday, May 14; 12:00 PM EDT; Game 5	(1) Reinhardt (GA)	4–11	(4) Ave Maria (FL)	Ken White Baseball Field, Waleska, GA; Attendance: 150
Wednesday, May 14; 12:00 PM EDT; Game 5	LP: Ryan Mahoney (0–1)	Boxscore	WP: Cameron Horner (7–2)	Ken White Baseball Field, Waleska, GA; Attendance: 150
Wednesday, May 14; 12:00 PM EDT; Game 5	HR: Jacob Mantooth (14), Luca Boscarino (8)	Boxscore	HR: Kyle Magdic (3), Sebastian Cabeza (3)	Ken White Baseball Field, Waleska, GA; Attendance: 150

Wednesday, May 14; 4:00 PM EDT; Game 6	(2) Loyola (LA)	8–9	(4) Ave Maria (FL)	Ken White Baseball Field, Waleska, GA; Attendance: 150
Wednesday, May 14; 4:00 PM EDT; Game 6	LP: Matthew Weil (6–1)	Boxscore	WP: Hunter Cashero (4–9); Sv: Ryan Young (1)	Ken White Baseball Field, Waleska, GA; Attendance: 150
Wednesday, May 14; 4:00 PM EDT; Game 6	HR: Marcus Steen (3)	Boxscore		Ken White Baseball Field, Waleska, GA; Attendance: 150

Thursday, May 15; 12:00 PM EDT; Game 7	(4) Ave Maria (FL)	4–8	(2) Loyola (LA)	Ken White Baseball Field, Waleska, GA; Attendance: 50
Thursday, May 15; 12:00 PM EDT; Game 7	LP: Owen Johnson (4–4)	Boxscore	WP: Cole Bordes (4–2)	Ken White Baseball Field, Waleska, GA; Attendance: 50
Thursday, May 15; 12:00 PM EDT; Game 7	HR: Michael Kelly (8)	Boxscore	HR: Anthony Fernandez (4)	Ken White Baseball Field, Waleska, GA; Attendance: 50

=== Williamsburg Bracket ===
Hosted by University of the Cumberlands at Doyle Buhl Stadium

==== Bracket ====
Upper round 1
1	Missouri Baptist	12^{7}
4	Northwestern Ohio	2
3	MidAmerica Nazarene (KS)	7
2	Cumberlands (KY)	8^{10}
Lower round 1
4	Northwestern Ohio	9
3	MidAmerica Nazarene (KS)	10^{10}

Semifinals
1	Missouri Baptist	6
2	Cumberlands (KY)	8^{10}
Lower final
3	MidAmerica Nazarene (KS)	2
1	Missouri Baptist	7

Final
2	Cumberlands (KY)	16	–
1	Missouri Baptist	6	–

==== Results ====
Monday, May 12; 7:00 PM EDT; Game 1	(3) MidAmerica Nazarene (KS)	7–8 (F/10)	(2) Cumberlands (KY)	Doyle Buhl Stadium, Williamsburg, KY; Umpires: HP: Jack Ross, 1B: John Kendrick, 2B: Harold Dawson, 3B: Sam Weinberg
Monday, May 12; 7:00 PM EDT; Game 1	LP: Reece Helland (3–1)	Boxscore	WP: Cooper Morgan (4–1)	Doyle Buhl Stadium, Williamsburg, KY; Umpires: HP: Jack Ross, 1B: John Kendrick, 2B: Harold Dawson, 3B: Sam Weinberg
Monday, May 12; 7:00 PM EDT; Game 1	HR: Kaden Owens (13), Christopher Lugo (8)	Boxscore	HR: Derick Andiarena (12), Pedro Vasquez (10)	Doyle Buhl Stadium, Williamsburg, KY; Umpires: HP: Jack Ross, 1B: John Kendrick, 2B: Harold Dawson, 3B: Sam Weinberg

Tuesday, May 13; 10:00 AM EDT; Game 2	(4) Northwestern Ohio	2–12 (F/7)	(1) Missouri Baptist	Doyle Buhl Stadium, Williamsburg, KY
Tuesday, May 13; 10:00 AM EDT; Game 2	LP: Will Myklebust (4–2)	Boxscore	WP: Carter Sabol (12–1)	Doyle Buhl Stadium, Williamsburg, KY
Tuesday, May 13; 10:00 AM EDT; Game 2	HR: Devon Tukes (8)	Boxscore	HR: James Jett 2 (20)	Doyle Buhl Stadium, Williamsburg, KY

Tuesday, May 13; 8:00 PM EDT; Game 3	(3) MidAmerica Nazarene (KS)	10–9 (F/10)	(4) Northwestern Ohio	Doyle Buhl Stadium, Williamsburg, KY; Umpires: HP: Dan Kaffee, 1B: Louden Downey, 2B: Karl Hammaker, 3B: RC Maguire
Tuesday, May 13; 8:00 PM EDT; Game 3	WP: Reece Helland (4–1)		LP: Brayden Lybarger (7–4)	Doyle Buhl Stadium, Williamsburg, KY; Umpires: HP: Dan Kaffee, 1B: Louden Downey, 2B: Karl Hammaker, 3B: RC Maguire
Tuesday, May 13; 8:00 PM EDT; Game 3	HR: Kaden Owens (14)		HR: Joskar Feliciano (3)	Doyle Buhl Stadium, Williamsburg, KY; Umpires: HP: Dan Kaffee, 1B: Louden Downey, 2B: Karl Hammaker, 3B: RC Maguire

Wednesday, May 14; 3:00 PM EDT; Game 4	(2) Cumberlands (KY)	8–6 (F/10)	(1) Missouri Baptist	Doyle Buhl Stadium, Williamsburg, KY
Wednesday, May 14; 3:00 PM EDT; Game 4	WP: Cooper Morgan (5–1)	Boxscore	LP: Zach Peters (2–1)	Doyle Buhl Stadium, Williamsburg, KY
Wednesday, May 14; 3:00 PM EDT; Game 4	HR: Charlie Muniz (33), Derick Andiarena (13), Caden Petrey (17)	Boxscore	HR: James Jett (21)	Doyle Buhl Stadium, Williamsburg, KY

Wednesday, May 14; 6:30 PM EDT; Game 5	(1) Missouri Baptist	7–2	(3) MidAmerica Nazarene (KS)	Doyle Buhl Stadium, Williamsburg, KY; Umpires: HP: Jack Ross, 1B: Cecil O'Malley, 2B: Julius Randolph, 3B: Jeff Barnes
Wednesday, May 14; 6:30 PM EDT; Game 5	WP: Austin Szverra (3–0)	Boxscore	LP: Owen Chaffin (5–2)	Doyle Buhl Stadium, Williamsburg, KY; Umpires: HP: Jack Ross, 1B: Cecil O'Malley, 2B: Julius Randolph, 3B: Jeff Barnes
Wednesday, May 14; 6:30 PM EDT; Game 5	HR: Cole Robinson (14), Carlos Hidalgo (6)	Boxscore	HR: Kaden Owens (15)	Doyle Buhl Stadium, Williamsburg, KY; Umpires: HP: Jack Ross, 1B: Cecil O'Malley, 2B: Julius Randolph, 3B: Jeff Barnes

Thursday, May 15; 12:00 PM EDT; Game 6	(1) Missouri Baptist	6–16	(2) Cumberlands (KY)	Doyle Buhl Stadium, Williamsburg, KY
Thursday, May 15; 12:00 PM EDT; Game 6	LP: Carter Sabol (12–2)	Boxscore	WP: JD Price (3–0)	Doyle Buhl Stadium, Williamsburg, KY
Thursday, May 15; 12:00 PM EDT; Game 6		Boxscore	HR: Charlie Muniz (34), Max Harper 2 (12), Pedro Vasquez (11)	Doyle Buhl Stadium, Williamsburg, KY

== NAIA World Series ==
The Avista NAIA World Series was held at Harris Field in Lewiston, Idaho from May 23 to 30.

=== Participants ===
School	Conference	Record	Head Coach	Bracket	Previous NAIA WS Appearances	Best NAIA WS Finish	NAIA WS Record
British Columbia	Cascade	39–17	Chris Pritchett	Hattiesburg	1 (last: 2006)	4th (2006)	2–2
Cumberlands (KY)	Mid-South	48–10	Brad Shelton	Williamsburg	2 (last: 2024)	T-7th (2024)	1–4
Georgia Gwinnett	Continental	53–5	Jeremy Sheetinger	Lawrenceville	7 (last: 2024)	1st (2021)	13–12
Grand View (IA)	Heart	38–12	Doug Brinker	Upland	3 (last: 1991)	T-7th (1984, 1991)	1–6
Hope International (CA)	Great Southwest	46–8	Larry Mahoney	Lewiston	2 (last: 2024)	1st (2024)	5–3
Loyola (LA)	Southern States	41–16	Jeremy Kennedy	Waleska	none	none	0–0
LSU-Shreveport	Red River	54–0	Brad Neffendorf	Shreveport	5 (last: 2022)	3rd (2003, 2012, 2022)	11–10
Southeastern (FL)	The Sun	44–13	Gabe Grinder	Lakeland	6 (last: 2024)	1st (2018, 2022)	17–9
Tennessee Wesleyan	Appalachian	46–12	Billy Berry	Kingsport	7 (last: 2024)	1st (2012, 2019)	17–12
Webber International (FL)	The Sun	44–13	Collin Martin	Lincoln	1 (last: 2022)	T-5th (2022)	2–2

=== Bracket ===
First Round
G2 – Friday, May 23
1	LSU-Shreveport	6
10	Grand View (IA)	3
G1 – Friday, May 23
4	Hope International (CA)	10
7	Cumberlands (KY)	4
G4 – Friday, May 23
2	Georgia Gwinnett	11^{8}
9	British Columbia	1
G3 – Friday, May 23
3	Tennessee Wesleyan	7
8	Loyola (LA)	3
G5 – Saturday, May 24
5	Webber International (FL)	2
6	Southeastern (FL)	15^{7}

Second Round
G10 – Monday, May 26
1	LSU-Shreveport	6
4	Hope International (CA)	3
G9 – Monday, May 26
2	Georgia Gwinnett	14^{7}
3	Tennessee Wesleyan	0
First Round; Losers eliminated
G6 – Saturday, May 24
7	Cumberlands (KY)	8
10	Grand View (IA)	6
G7 – Saturday, May 24
9	British Columbia	9
8	Loyola (LA)	12

Third Round
G13 – Tuesday, May 27
2	Georgia Gwinnett	1
6	Southeastern (FL)	2
Second Round; Losers eliminated
G8 – Monday, May 26
7	Cumberlands (KY)	9
8	Loyola (LA)	8
G11 – Tuesday, May 27
5	Webber International (FL)	7
3	Tennessee Wesleyan	17

Fourth Round
G15 – Wednesday, May 28
1	LSU-Shreveport	10^{7}
6	Southeastern (FL)	0
Third Round; Loser eliminated
G12 – Tuesday, May 27
4	Hope International (CA)	9
7	Cumberlands (KY)	7
G14 – Wednesday, May 28
2	Georgia Gwinnett	5
3	Tennessee Wesleyan	3

Semifinals
G17 – Thursday, May 29
1	LSU-Shreveport	14
4	Hope International (CA)	4
G16 – Thursday, May 29
6	Southeastern (FL)	16^{7}
2	Georgia Gwinnett	6

Championship
G18 – Friday, May 30
1	LSU-Shreveport	13	–
6	Southeastern (FL)	7	–

=== Game Results ===
All game times are listed in Pacific Daylight Time (UTC−07:00).

Friday, May 23; 8:35 AM; Game 1	(7) Cumberlands (KY)	4–10	(4) Hope International (CA)	Harris Field; Attendance: 720; Umpires: HP: Drew Eaton, 1B: Cody Whitehead, 2B: Kalen Hamilton, 3B: Casey Sanchez
Friday, May 23; 8:35 AM; Game 1	LP: Kailen Hamson (11–1)	Boxscore	WP: Chaz McWilliams (1–1)	Harris Field; Attendance: 720; Umpires: HP: Drew Eaton, 1B: Cody Whitehead, 2B: Kalen Hamilton, 3B: Casey Sanchez

Friday, May 23; 11:35 AM; Game 2	(10) Grand View (IA)	3–6	(1) LSU-Shreveport	Harris Field; Attendance: 1170; Umpires: HP: Ryan Storck, 1B: Jeremy Hosier, 2B: Jim Courtney, 3B: Tyler Schmidt
Friday, May 23; 11:35 AM; Game 2	LP: Kaleb Krier (9–2)	Boxscore	WP: Isaac Rohde (15–0); Sv: Brock Lucas (3)	Harris Field; Attendance: 1170; Umpires: HP: Ryan Storck, 1B: Jeremy Hosier, 2B: Jim Courtney, 3B: Tyler Schmidt
Friday, May 23; 11:35 AM; Game 2	HR: Brock Johnson (16), Brock Rinehart (19)	Boxscore	HR: Austin Gomm (12), Jackson Syring (6), Diego Aragon (7)	Harris Field; Attendance: 1170; Umpires: HP: Ryan Storck, 1B: Jeremy Hosier, 2B: Jim Courtney, 3B: Tyler Schmidt

Friday, May 23; 3:05 PM; Game 3	(8) Loyola (LA)	3–7	(3) Tennessee Wesleyan	Harris Field; Attendance: 790; Umpires: HP: Casey Sanchez, 1B: Drew Eaton, 2B: Cody Whitehead, 3B: Kalen Hamilton
Friday, May 23; 3:05 PM; Game 3	LP: Thomas Hakimian (7–2)	Boxscore	WP: Blake Peyton (8–1); Sv: Cameron Goffar (3)	Harris Field; Attendance: 790; Umpires: HP: Casey Sanchez, 1B: Drew Eaton, 2B: Cody Whitehead, 3B: Kalen Hamilton
Friday, May 23; 3:05 PM; Game 3		Boxscore	HR: Kolton Reynolds (24)	Harris Field; Attendance: 790; Umpires: HP: Casey Sanchez, 1B: Drew Eaton, 2B: Cody Whitehead, 3B: Kalen Hamilton

Friday, May 23; 7:05 PM; Game 4	(9) British Columbia	1–11 (F/8)	(2) Georgia Gwinnett	Harris Field; Attendance: 1315; Umpires: HP: Tyler Schmidt, 1B: Ryan Storck, 2B: Jeremy Hosier, 3B: Jim Courtney
Friday, May 23; 7:05 PM; Game 4	LP: Will Anderson (7–2)	Boxscore	WP: Ben Harris (12–0)	Harris Field; Attendance: 1315; Umpires: HP: Tyler Schmidt, 1B: Ryan Storck, 2B: Jeremy Hosier, 3B: Jim Courtney
Friday, May 23; 7:05 PM; Game 4		Boxscore	HR: Alex Harrell (5)	Harris Field; Attendance: 1315; Umpires: HP: Tyler Schmidt, 1B: Ryan Storck, 2B: Jeremy Hosier, 3B: Jim Courtney

Saturday, May 24; 11:05 AM; Game 5	(6) Southeastern (FL)	15–2 (F/7)	(5) Webber International (FL)	Harris Field; Attendance: 795; Umpires: HP: Kalen Hamilton, 1B: Tyler Schmidt, 2B: Drew Eaton, 3B: Cody Whitehead
Saturday, May 24; 11:05 AM; Game 5	WP: Reece Wissinger (9–0)	Boxscore	LP: Blayne Huter (14–2)	Harris Field; Attendance: 795; Umpires: HP: Kalen Hamilton, 1B: Tyler Schmidt, 2B: Drew Eaton, 3B: Cody Whitehead
Saturday, May 24; 11:05 AM; Game 5	HR: Connor Hicks (13), Alfonso Villalobos (15), James Strom (7)	Boxscore		Harris Field; Attendance: 795; Umpires: HP: Kalen Hamilton, 1B: Tyler Schmidt, 2B: Drew Eaton, 3B: Cody Whitehead

Saturday, May 24; 3:05 PM; Game 6	(10) Grand View (IA)	6–8	(7) Cumberlands (KY)	Harris Field; Attendance: 865; Umpires: HP: Jim Courtney, 1B: Casey Sanchez, 2B; Ryan Storck, 3B: Jeremy Hosier
Saturday, May 24; 3:05 PM; Game 6	LP: Jacob Draeger (2–3)	Boxscore	WP: Knicko Billings (10–1); Sv: JD Price (10)	Harris Field; Attendance: 865; Umpires: HP: Jim Courtney, 1B: Casey Sanchez, 2B; Ryan Storck, 3B: Jeremy Hosier
Saturday, May 24; 3:05 PM; Game 6	HR: Hank Himrich (17)	Boxscore		Harris Field; Attendance: 865; Umpires: HP: Jim Courtney, 1B: Casey Sanchez, 2B; Ryan Storck, 3B: Jeremy Hosier

Saturday, May 24; 6:35 PM; Game 7	(9) British Columbia	9–12	(8) Loyola (LA)	Harris Field; Attendance: 1835; Umpires: HP: Tyler Wall, 1B: Drew Eaton, 2B: Kalen Hamilton, 3B: Cody Whitehead
Saturday, May 24; 6:35 PM; Game 7	LP: Ryan Beitel (5–4)	Boxscore	WP: Payton Cooper (4–0); Sv: Caden Durand (7)	Harris Field; Attendance: 1835; Umpires: HP: Tyler Wall, 1B: Drew Eaton, 2B: Kalen Hamilton, 3B: Cody Whitehead
Saturday, May 24; 6:35 PM; Game 7	HR: Jonny McGill (18)	Boxscore	HR: Brandon Mooney (5), Anthony Fernandez (5)	Harris Field; Attendance: 1835; Umpires: HP: Tyler Wall, 1B: Drew Eaton, 2B: Kalen Hamilton, 3B: Cody Whitehead

Monday, May 26; 11:05 AM; Game 8	(8) Loyola (LA)	8–9	(7) Cumberlands (KY)	Harris Field; Attendance: 1140; Umpires: HP: Jeremy Hosier, 1B: Jim Courtney, 2B: Tyler Wall, 3B: Ryan Storck
Monday, May 26; 11:05 AM; Game 8	LP: Charlie Nichols (2–1)	Boxscore	WP: Jake Kmiecik (6–2); Sv: Ben Rohrbach (2)	Harris Field; Attendance: 1140; Umpires: HP: Jeremy Hosier, 1B: Jim Courtney, 2B: Tyler Wall, 3B: Ryan Storck
Monday, May 26; 11:05 AM; Game 8		Boxscore	HR: Charlie Muniz (35), Pedro Vasquez (12)	Harris Field; Attendance: 1140; Umpires: HP: Jeremy Hosier, 1B: Jim Courtney, 2B: Tyler Wall, 3B: Ryan Storck

Monday, May 26; 3:05 PM; Game 9	(2) Georgia Gwinnett	14–0 (F/7)	(3) Tennessee Wesleyan	Harris Field; Attendance: 1165; Umpires: HP: Cody Whitehead, 1B: Kalen Hamilton, 2B: Casey Sanchez, 3B: Drew Eaton
Monday, May 26; 3:05 PM; Game 9	WP: Anthony Patterson III (7–3)	Boxscore	LP: Daniel Batcher (11–3)	Harris Field; Attendance: 1165; Umpires: HP: Cody Whitehead, 1B: Kalen Hamilton, 2B: Casey Sanchez, 3B: Drew Eaton
Monday, May 26; 3:05 PM; Game 9	HR: Paul Winland Jr. (9)	Boxscore		Harris Field; Attendance: 1165; Umpires: HP: Cody Whitehead, 1B: Kalen Hamilton, 2B: Casey Sanchez, 3B: Drew Eaton

Monday, May 26; 6:35 PM; Game 10	(1) LSU-Shreveport	6–3	(4) Hope International (CA)	Harris Field; Attendance: 2370; Umpires: HP: Ryan Storck, 1B: Jeremy Hosier, 2B: Jim Courtney, 3B: Tyler Wall
Monday, May 26; 6:35 PM; Game 10	WP: Draven Zeigler (13–0); Sv: Brock Lucas (4)	Boxscore	LP: Josh Landry (11–1)	Harris Field; Attendance: 2370; Umpires: HP: Ryan Storck, 1B: Jeremy Hosier, 2B: Jim Courtney, 3B: Tyler Wall

Tuesday, May 27; 11:05 AM; Game 11	(3) Tennessee Wesleyan	17–7	(5) Webber International (FL)	Harris Field; Attendance: 610; Umpires: HP: Drew Eaton, 1B: Casey Sanchez, 2B: Kalen Hamilton, 3B: Cody Whitehead
Tuesday, May 27; 11:05 AM; Game 11	WP: Justin Jackson (7–1)	Boxscore	LP: Mark Link (6–4)	Harris Field; Attendance: 610; Umpires: HP: Drew Eaton, 1B: Casey Sanchez, 2B: Kalen Hamilton, 3B: Cody Whitehead
Tuesday, May 27; 11:05 AM; Game 11	HR: Devin Dixon (11), Daniel Stewart (20), Corbin Shaw (27), Cody McGill (4)	Boxscore		Harris Field; Attendance: 610; Umpires: HP: Drew Eaton, 1B: Casey Sanchez, 2B: Kalen Hamilton, 3B: Cody Whitehead

Tuesday, May 27; 3:05 PM; Game 12	(4) Hope International (CA)	9–7	(7) Cumberlands (KY)	Harris Field; Attendance: 230; Umpires: HP: Cody Whitehead, 1B: Kalen Hamilton, 2B: Casey Sanchez, 3B: Drew Eaton
Tuesday, May 27; 3:05 PM; Game 12	WP: Chaz McWilliams (2–1)	Boxscore	LP: Knicko Billings (10–2)	Harris Field; Attendance: 230; Umpires: HP: Cody Whitehead, 1B: Kalen Hamilton, 2B: Casey Sanchez, 3B: Drew Eaton
Tuesday, May 27; 3:05 PM; Game 12	HR: Matthew Pinal (11), Colby Moran (12), Trotter Boston (12)	Boxscore	HR: Charlie Muniz (36)	Harris Field; Attendance: 230; Umpires: HP: Cody Whitehead, 1B: Kalen Hamilton, 2B: Casey Sanchez, 3B: Drew Eaton

Tuesday, May 27; 6:35 PM; Game 13	(2) Georgia Gwinnett	1–2	(6) Southeastern (FL)	Harris Field; Attendance: 1405; Umpires: HP: Casey Sanchez, 1B: Drew Eaton, 2B: Cody Whitehead, 3B: Kalen Hamilton
Tuesday, May 27; 6:35 PM; Game 13	LP: Jaxon Dennis (2–1)	Boxscore	WP: Aaron Robertson (11–2)	Harris Field; Attendance: 1405; Umpires: HP: Casey Sanchez, 1B: Drew Eaton, 2B: Cody Whitehead, 3B: Kalen Hamilton

Wednesday, May 28; 3:05 PM; Game 14	(3) Tennessee Wesleyan	3–5	(2) Georgia Gwinnett	Harris Field; Attendance: 215; Umpires: HP: Jim Courtney, 1B: Jeremy Hosier, 2B: Ryan Storck, 3B: Tyler Wall
Wednesday, May 28; 3:05 PM; Game 14	LP: Blake Peyton (8–2)	Boxscore	WP: Shane Anderson (5–1); Sv: Tyler E. Martin (5)	Harris Field; Attendance: 215; Umpires: HP: Jim Courtney, 1B: Jeremy Hosier, 2B: Ryan Storck, 3B: Tyler Wall
Wednesday, May 28; 3:05 PM; Game 14		Boxscore	HR: Jon Ponder (10)	Harris Field; Attendance: 215; Umpires: HP: Jim Courtney, 1B: Jeremy Hosier, 2B: Ryan Storck, 3B: Tyler Wall

Wednesday, May 28; 6:35 PM; Game 15	(6) Southeastern (FL)	0–10 (F/7)	(1) LSU-Shreveport	Harris Field; Attendance: 1130; Umpires: HP: Kalen Hamilton, 1B: Casey Sanchez, 2B: Drew Eaton, 3B: Cody Whitehead
Wednesday, May 28; 6:35 PM; Game 15	LP: Bryce McDonald (6–5)	Boxscore	WP: Isaac Rohde (16–0)	Harris Field; Attendance: 1130; Umpires: HP: Kalen Hamilton, 1B: Casey Sanchez, 2B: Drew Eaton, 3B: Cody Whitehead
Wednesday, May 28; 6:35 PM; Game 15		Boxscore	HR: Anthony Swenda (8)	Harris Field; Attendance: 1130; Umpires: HP: Kalen Hamilton, 1B: Casey Sanchez, 2B: Drew Eaton, 3B: Cody Whitehead

Thursday, May 29; 3:05 PM; Game 16	(2) Georgia Gwinnett	6–16 (F/7)	(6) Southeastern (FL)	Harris Field; Attendance: 495; Umpires: HP: Drew Eaton, 1B: Jeremy Hosier, 2B: Cody Whitehead, 3B: Jim Courtney
Thursday, May 29; 3:05 PM; Game 16	LP: Ben Harris (12–1)	Boxscore	WP: Agnel Miranda (6–1)	Harris Field; Attendance: 495; Umpires: HP: Drew Eaton, 1B: Jeremy Hosier, 2B: Cody Whitehead, 3B: Jim Courtney
Thursday, May 29; 3:05 PM; Game 16		Boxscore	HR: Connor Hicks (14)	Harris Field; Attendance: 495; Umpires: HP: Drew Eaton, 1B: Jeremy Hosier, 2B: Cody Whitehead, 3B: Jim Courtney

Thursday, May 29; 6:35 PM; Game 17	(1) LSU-Shreveport	14–4	(4) Hope International (CA)	Harris Field; Attendance: 1470; Umpires: HP: Casey Sanchez, 1B: Tyler Wall, 2B: Jim Courtney, 3B: Ryan Storck
Thursday, May 29; 6:35 PM; Game 17	WP: Cobe Reeves (12–0)	Boxscore	LP: Josh Landry (11–2)	Harris Field; Attendance: 1470; Umpires: HP: Casey Sanchez, 1B: Tyler Wall, 2B: Jim Courtney, 3B: Ryan Storck

==== Championship Game ====
Friday, May 30 6:35 PM at Harris Field Game 18
Team	1	2	3	4	5	6	7	8	9	R	H	E
Southeastern (FL)	2	2	0	2	1	0	0	0	0	7	8	2
LSU-Shreveport	0	3	2	0	1	4	1	2	X	13	11	1
WP: Kenneth Schechter (4–0) LP: Bryce McDonald (6–6); Home runs: SEU: None; LSUS: Jackson Syring (7), Ian Montz (6); Attendance: 2435; Umpires: HP: Jeremy Hosier, 1B: Kalen Hamilton, 2B: Jim Courtney, 3B: Cody Whitehead, LF: Drew Eaton, RF: Casey Sanchez; Notes: LSU-Shreveport completes first perfect season in college baseball history finishing with a record of 59–0. Boxscore

== See also ==
- 2025 NAIA softball tournament
- 2025 NCAA Division I baseball tournament
- 2025 NCAA Division II baseball tournament
- 2025 NCAA Division III baseball tournament
