= Christian College of America =

College in Houston, Texas

Christian College of America was an all-denomination Christian college in Houston, Texas.

== History ==
In 1984 Gulf Coast Bible College announced it was leaving Houston and moving to Oklahoma City, Oklahoma. Odus Eubank, the vice president for academic affairs, told the president of Gulf Coast in September 1984 that he was not going to Oklahoma. In the northern hemisphere spring of the following year, Eubank resigned. The school opened in June 1985 for a summer session. Its entire autumn session began in September of that year. It anticipated having about 100 students. Eubank said that most of the students at Christian College would be new students and not existing Gulf Coast students.

== Facility ==
The school was located in Suite 668 on the uppermost floor of the 2500 East T.C.Jester building, a six-story office building. The school held 25,000 square feet (2,300 m^{2}) of space. Of that space, the school sublet some of it to other evangelical groups. Groups that took the space included The 700 Club, New Testament Pocket League, Reconciliation Ministry, Turning Points Ministry, and Jack Wood Ministries.

== Courses and offerings ==
When it opened, its classes were from 9AM to 9 PM from Monday to Friday. The school charged $150 for each course, which had three credits.(The $150 per credit hour was called a pioneer scholarship. It was offered to encourage new students to enroll as the new college was not yet accredited. The student could retain the $150 per credit hour for the full 4 years, if they enrolled for at least 1 class each semester.)

The school had a liberal arts academic program with an emphasis on Christianity. The courses included "Dynamic Methods of Studying Scripture," "Preparing Laypersons for Ministry," "Psychological Types," and "Tests and Measurements for Teachers." The school offered the Greek and Hebrew languages to students on an individual basis.
