= Mid-America Christian University =

Christian college in Oklahoma City, Oklahoma, US

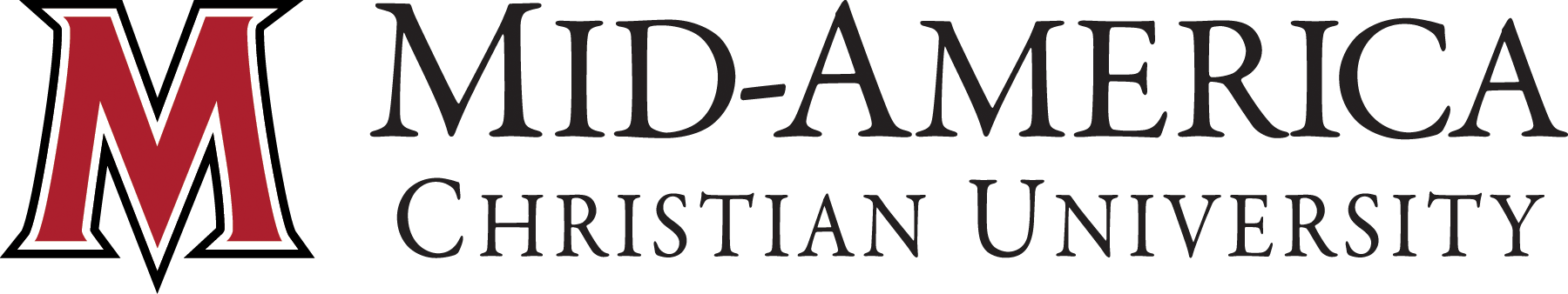
- Former names: South Texas Bible Institute (1953–1955); Gulf Coast Bible College (1955–1985); Mid-America Bible College (1985–2003)
- Motto: Dream BIGGER. Do GREATER.
- Type: Private university
- Established: 1953
- Religious affiliation: Church of God (Anderson)
- President: Phil Greenwald
- Students: 2,558
- Location: Oklahoma City, Oklahoma, U.S. 35°20′52″N 97°34′42″W
- Campus: 65-acre (26 ha)
- Colors: Red & White
- Nickname: Evangels
- Sporting affiliations: NAIA – Sooner; NCCAA Division I – Central
- Mascot: Evangel
- Website: www.macu.edu

Mid-America Christian University (MACU) is a private Christian university in Oklahoma City, Oklahoma, United States. MACU is an endorsed agency of the Church of God (Anderson, Indiana) and is accredited by the Higher Learning Commission. MACU was initially founded as the South Texas Bible Institute in 1953 in Houston Heights, Houston, Texas.

More than 60 courses of study are offered through MACU's twelve academic schools.

== History ==
History at a glance
South Texas Bible Institute	Established	1953
Gulf Coast Bible College	Renamed	1955
Gulf Coast Bible College	Accredited	1978
Mid-America Bible College	Relocated and renamed	1985
Mid-America Christian University	Renamed	2003

The institution, now known as MACU, was founded on September 14, 1953, as the South Texas Bible Institute in Houston, Texas. It was chartered as a center for higher education. Max R. Gaulke established the institution with the help of the First Church of God.

In the fall of 1955, the curriculum of the institution was expanded to that of a four-year university and the name was changed to Gulf Coast Bible College. In 1966, Gulf-Coast Bible College became an associate member of the American Association of Bible Colleges and was granted full membership in 1968. The Southern Association of Colleges and Schools, the regional accrediting association, granted full accreditation in 1978.

The Gulf Coast Bible College became a general agency of the Church of God (Anderson) in June 1968. The Executive Council of the Church of God accepted the college as a member organization. Additionally, the college also was granted membership on the Commission on Higher Education of the Church of God.

When the college was in the Houston Heights, it tried to establish a campus by buying houses and tearing them down. In 1984 the university announced that it was moving to Oklahoma City. Not all of the officials wanted to move to Oklahoma.

In September 1984 Odus Eubank, the vice president for academic affairs said that he did not want to go to Oklahoma. He resigned in the spring of 1985. The Gulf Coast Bible College relocated to Oklahoma City in June 1985, and changed its name to Mid-America Bible College. Eubank formed the Christian College of America of Houston with other pastors.

The institution adopted its current name, Mid-America Christian University, in 2003.

== Academics ==
MACU offers Bible-based liberal arts programs and ministry education. It is accredited by the Higher Learning Commission.

Through twelve academic schools, the university provides undergraduate degrees, graduate degrees and certificates. The university also offers a life experience program, allowing students to convert prior work, military, church, volunteer and general life experience into up to 30 hours of college credit towards their undergraduate degree program.

In 2019, the university announced a program called FastTrack. Through FastTrack, students can combine any undergraduate program with either a Master of Business Administration (MBA) or a Master of Arts in Leadership to complete both degrees in five years.

=== Military ===
MACU participates in the Post-9/11 G.I. Bill Yellow Ribbon Program and meets the cost per hour of $250 allotted for active military. The university staffs a dedicated office of veterans and family members of veterans to help current and former members of the armed forces with their educational experience.

== Campus ==
The university campus consists of eight buildings set on a 65-acre (260,000 m^{2}) plot. The main building has nearly two acres under the same roof. The college auditorium has the capacity of 670 seats, which is used for chapel, assemblies, and other special weeks.

=== Library ===
The Charles Ewing Brown Library, located on campus, offers the students and faculty access to resources for use in academic research as well as for personal pleasure. The Library's collection contains over 166,800 volumes, including: over 41,100 print book and periodical titles, over 58,200 electronic book titles, over 15,400 online periodical titles, and over 4,100 online government documents. It seats over 150 students and has 33 computer stations, two meeting rooms, and an Education Resource Center for students in the School of Teacher Education.

The C. E. Brown Library participates in the OK-Share card system provided by the Oklahoma Council of Academic Library Directors (OCALD).

== Athletics ==
The Mid-America Christian (MACU) athletic teams are called the Evangels. The university is a member of the National Association of Intercollegiate Athletics (NAIA), primarily competing in the Sooner Athletic Conference (SAC) since the 2007–08 academic year. They are also a member of the National Christian College Athletic Association (NCCAA), primarily competing as an independent in the Central Region of the Division I level.

MACU competes in eight intercollegiate varsity sports: Men's sports include baseball, basketball and soccer; while women's sports include basketball, soccer, softball and volleyball; and co-ed sports include eSports.

In 2016, the men's basketball team won the Buffalo Funds NAIA Championship in Kansas City, Missouri. This was the school's first and only NAIA national title (although they have won several NCCAA titles).

In 2018, the men's soccer team won the SAC conference tournament championship. This was the first SAC title MACU has claimed in any sport.
