= Kresta =

Kresta is a surname. Notable people with the surname include:

- Al Kresta (1951–2024), American Catholic broadcaster, journalist, and author
- Roman Kresta (born 1976), Czech rally driver
- Suzanne Kresta, Canadian chemical engineer and academic administrator
