= Tom Monaghan =

American entrepreneur and philanthropist (born 1937)

- Born: Thomas Stephen Monaghan; March 25, 1937 (age 89); Ann Arbor, Michigan, U.S.
- Education: University of Michigan
- Occupations: Entrepreneur; philanthropist
- Known for: Founder of Ave Maria University; Founder of Domino's Pizza; Former owner of the Detroit Tigers (1983–1992)
- Political party: Republican
- Spouse: Marjorie Zybach (m. 1962; died 2023)
- Children: 4
- Military career
- Allegiance: United States
- Branch: United States Marine Corps
- Service years: 1956–1959

Thomas Stephen Monaghan (born March 25, 1937) is an American entrepreneur and philanthropist who founded Domino's Pizza in 1960. He also owns the Domino's Farms Office Park in Ann Arbor Charter Township, Michigan, and owned the Detroit Tigers of Major League Baseball from 1983 to 1992.

== Early life ==
After his father died when Monaghan was four years old, Monaghan's mother had difficulties raising him alone, and at age six, in 1943, Monaghan and his younger brother Jim ended up in an orphanage until their mother collected them again in 1949. The orphanage, St. Joseph Home for Children in Jackson, Michigan, was run by the Felician Sisters of Livonia; one of the nuns there inspired his devotion to the Catholic faith and he later entered St. Joseph's Seminary, in Grand Rapids, with the desire to eventually become a priest. Subsequently, he was expelled from the seminary for a series of disciplinary infractions.

In 1956, Monaghan enlisted in the United States Marine Corps by mistake; he had meant to join the Army. He received an honorable discharge in 1959.

== Domino's Pizza ==
Monaghan returned to Ann Arbor, Michigan, in 1959, and enrolled in the University of Michigan, intending to become an architect. While still a student, he and his brother James borrowed $900 to purchase a small pizza store called DomiNick's in Ypsilanti, Michigan. "I started out in architecture school, and got into the pizza business to pay my way through school," he has said. "The pizza business was losing so much money I never got back into architecture." This business would, after a lawsuit from Domino Sugar, grow into Domino's Pizza. Tom, after opening a further three stores, traded his brother James a Volkswagen Beetle for his half of the business. Monaghan dropped sub sandwiches from the menu and focused on delivery to college campuses, inventing a new insulated pizza box to improve delivery. The new box, unlike its chipboard predecessors, could be stacked without crushing the pizzas inside, permitting more pizzas per trip, and keeping them warm until they arrived. As Monaghan spread his model to other college towns through a tightly controlled franchising system, by the mid-1980s there were nearly three new Domino's franchises opening every day.

In 1989, the National Organization for Women (NOW) called for a boycott of Domino's because of his active opposition to abortion; however, it is unclear what effect, if any, that had on the company's sales.

In 1998, Monaghan reportedly sold his 93% of stock ownership of Domino's Pizza to Bain Capital, an investment firm based in Boston, for an estimated $1 billion. Domino's Pizza is an American restaurant chain and the international franchise pizza delivery corporation is headquartered at the Domino's Farms Office Park (the campus itself owned by Monaghan) in Ann Arbor Township, Michigan, United States, near Ann Arbor.

== Gyrene Burger Company ==
In December 2011, Monaghan embarked on his second quick service restaurant brand by starting Gyrene Burger Company. The military-themed burger delivery concept was a throwback to Monaghan's days in the U.S. Marines. The term "Gyrene" was used in the 1940s and 1950s as a nickname for Marines. At Gyrene Burger, Monaghan provided franchise incentives to eligible Marines and veterans of the other military branches. The flagship store for the brand was located in Naples, FL, before relocating to Knoxville, TN. As of August 2018, no locations are in operation.

== Leisure ==
=== Detroit Tigers ===
In 1983, Monaghan bought the Detroit Tigers, who won the World Series a year later. In 1984, he received the Golden Plate Award of the American Academy of Achievement. He became close to Major League Baseball commissioner Bowie Kuhn, who remained a close friend, business associate and participant in his many philanthropic works. Monaghan ultimately sold the Tigers to his competitor Mike Ilitch of Little Caesar's Pizza in 1992. Combining his passion for pizza and baseball, his 1986 autobiography was titled Pizza Tiger.

=== Frank Lloyd Wright ===
Monaghan is an admirer of Frank Lloyd Wright's architecture, and the Domino's headquarters in Ann Arbor Township, Michigan, strongly resembles Wright's Prairie School architecture adapted to a larger scale. The headquarter's address of 24 Frank Lloyd Wright Drive also shows Monaghan's admiration. He has been one of the foremost collectors of Wright artifacts, including an oak dining room table and chairs for which he paid $1.6 million. He purchased a portion of Drummond Island in Michigan, where he created a private resort complex featuring buildings designed in the style of Wright, and later sold it to Clifton Haley and Denny Bailey.

=== Other ===
Another of Monaghan's expensive passions was automobiles; for a time, his collection included one of the world's six Bugatti Royales, for which he paid $8.1 million in 1986, and sold it for $8 million in 1991.

In the early 1990s, he also built a mansion in a Honduras mountain town; he also funded and supervised the construction of a new cathedral in Managua, Nicaragua, after the old cathedral was destroyed in a 1972 earthquake.

=== Divestment ===
The wealth Monaghan amassed from Domino's Pizza enabled a lavish lifestyle. However, after reading a passage by C. S. Lewis on pride (from Mere Christianity), Monaghan divested himself of most of his more ostentatious possessions, including the Detroit Tigers in 1992. He gave up his lavish office suite at Domino's headquarters, replete with leather-tiled floors and an array of expensive Frank Lloyd Wright furnishings, turning it into a corporate reception room. He also ceased construction on a huge Wright-inspired mansion that was to be his home. (The house remains half-finished.)

== Catholic philanthropy and activism ==
Monaghan is a Roman Catholic with a particular interest in pro-life causes. He announced his retirement in 1998 after 38 years with Domino's Pizza, Inc. Monaghan sold 93 percent of the company to Bain Capital for around $1 billion, ceased being involved in day-to-day operations of the company, and subsequently dedicated his time and considerable fortune to Catholic causes. A supporter of Catholic teachings "to combat the nation's 'moral crisis'", Monaghan has spent hundreds of millions of dollars promoting them.

He established or helped establish a number of Catholic organizations and educational establishments. The orchestral Ave Maria Mass, by composer Stephen Edwards, was commissioned by Monaghan "to express in music the spiritual commitment behind the founding of Ave Maria College and Ave Maria School of Law". This mass, recorded and released on CD in 2002, was dedicated by the composer to the victims of the September 11, 2001 attacks. Monaghan publicly promotes daily attendance at Mass, daily recitation of the rosary and frequent sacramental confession. He has also committed to spending what remains of his $1 billion fortune on philanthropic endeavors.

Though Monaghan has denied ever being a member of the Word of God community, in 1989 a coalition of seven groups (including the National Organization for Women, the Latin American Solidarity Committee, and the Ann Arbor Commission to Defend Abortion Rights) protested an alleged connection between Monaghan and Word of God.

=== Catholic organizations ===
In 1983, he established the Mater Christi Foundation, today known as the Ave Maria Foundation, to focus on Catholic education, media, community projects and other charities. Monaghan is founder and CEO of Legatus International, an organization of business Executives, Presidents, CEOs, and their spouses who are committed to studying, living and spreading the Catholic faith. Founded in 1987, Legatus empowers their 5,000+ members to boldly live their Catholic identity as "Ambassadors for Christ in the Marketplace". In 1988, Pope John Paul II addressed members of Legatus and encouraged them, “The world needs genuine witnesses to Christian ethics in the field of business and the Church asks you to fulfill this role publicly with courage and perseverance.”

In 1997, he recruited former Evangelical pastor Al Kresta to lead Ave Maria Communications, which became the first Catholic radio apostolate in America with the popularly known Ave Maria Radio. He also established the Ave Maria List anti-abortion political action committee, and the Thomas More Law Center, a public interest law firm dedicated to promoting social conservative issues such as opposition to abortion, same sex marriage, and secularism.

In addition, his foundation established the Spiritus Sanctus Academies. These elementary schools are administered by the Dominican Sisters of Mary, Mother of the Eucharist.

The Ave Maria Foundation has subsequently fine-tuned its focus to higher education, and has established both a university and a law school. Along with that change in focus, many of the other non-profit entities that the Ave Maria Foundation established have become independent or are in the process of being weaned from Ave Maria Foundation grants.

Monaghan is reputed to be a member of Opus Dei and has been aligned with a number of other conservative Catholic organizations and causes.

Monaghan is a donor to Priests for Life, a Roman Catholic pro-life organization. He is a knight of magistral grace in the Sovereign Military Order of Malta.

=== Ave Maria School of Law ===
The Ave Maria School of Law, previously located in Ann Arbor, Michigan, opened its doors in 2000 and received full accreditation from the American Bar Association in 2005. The school was a dream of several professors from the Catholic University of Detroit Mercy, who publicly left that institution when it allowed several pro-choice members of the Michigan Supreme Court to appear at the school's annual "Red Mass." Professors Stephen Safranek, Mollie Murphy, Richard Myers and Joseph Falvey, setting out to form a new orthodox Catholic law school, presented their idea to Monaghan (who had previously been a strong supporter of opening a new law school at Franciscan University) to provide significant funding through his Ave Maria Foundation. Together they enlisted Bernard Dobranski, Dean at The Catholic University of America's law school and former Dean of Detroit Mercy's Law School, to lead up the new school as dean. Monaghan served as president of the school's Board of Governors.

Faculty members have included conservative legal scholar and Supreme Court nominee Judge Robert Bork. Supreme Court Justice Antonin Scalia assisted in developing the school's curriculum, and the school's first annual Ave Maria Lecture was presented by Supreme Court Justice Clarence Thomas in 1999. The school's stated goal is to educate competent moral attorneys who will influence all aspects of the legal profession and advance natural law theory. The Ave Maria Law School graduated its last Michigan class in the spring of 2009 before relocating to Naples, Florida.

=== Ave Maria College ===
As a step to fulfilling his dream of creating a new Catholic university, Monaghan founded Ave Maria College in Ypsilanti, Michigan. In various attempts to accelerate accreditation, Monaghan acquired St. Mary's College of Orchard Lake and a campus in Nicaragua, renamed Ave Maria College of the Americas.

Due to lack of funding, the college, against faculty and student protests, closed in 2007. Alternative funding was not secured to prevent the school's closure. St. Mary's College was sold and is now under the auspices of nearby Madonna University.

=== Ave Maria University, Florida ===
In early 2002, Monaghan sought to establish the Ave Maria University in Ann Arbor, at Domino's Farms, the large corporate office park that he owned and leased to Domino's Pizza. The plans included a 250-foot crucifix, taller than the Statue of Liberty. Local officials refused to approve the zoning change, forcing him to look elsewhere for a site. Eventually, community leaders in Collier County, Florida, offered him a large undeveloped tract of land thirty miles east of Naples, Florida to develop the university.

In February 2006, ground was broken for the new Catholic university and town, Ave Maria, Florida. A joint venture, in which Monaghan is a 50% partner with developer Barron Collier, controls all non-university real estate in the town, and plans to build 11,000 homes and several business districts. Pulte Homes has been signed up to build most of the private homes. Monaghan said in 2005 that any town retailers would not be allowed to sell contraceptives or pornography, a statement that drew legal criticism from the American Civil Liberties Union.

Threatened with lawsuits, Monaghan and the developers went on a national public relations campaign in March 2007 to retract the notion that Catholic doctrine could ever be enforced as law. Defenders of Wildlife also challenged the development, stating it is destroying habitat of the endangered Florida panther.

=== Ave Maria Mutual Funds ===
Monaghan helped to establish the Ave Maria Mutual Funds by asking friend George P. Schwartz of Schwartz Investment Counsel, Inc. to launch the Ave Maria Catholic Values Fund in May 2001. There are now five Ave Maria Mutual Funds. They are described as targeted at investors seeking to place their money in companies whose operations are in keeping with the core teachings of the Catholic Church. The fund calls their shareholders "morally responsible investors". The funds are open to individual investors with a $1,000 minimum investment.

Monaghan is a member of the Catholic Advisory Board. The board sets the religious criteria that screen companies before the funds will invest in them. Involvement with contraception, non-marital partner employee benefits, pornography, and abortion are some issues that disqualify a company from the fund. Lou Holtz, Larry Kudlow, Michael Novak, Phyllis Schlafly and Paul Roney are the other members of the Funds' Catholic Advisory Board. Cardinal Adam Maida (of the Archdiocese of Detroit) is the board's ecclesiastic advisor.

== Personal ==
=== Political support ===
Monaghan has been active in Republican Party politics, and was one of the key financial backers of Sam Brownback in his 2008 presidential campaign. Monaghan endorsed Donald Trump during his 2020 presidential campaign.

=== Family ===
Monaghan and his wife, Marjorie Zybach, whom he met while delivering pizza, were married in 1962 and have four daughters: Margaret, Susan, Mary and Barbara. In 2023, his wife, Marjorie died at age 83 from Leukemia. They were married for 60 years. As of 2025, they have 10 grandchildren and eight great-grandchildren.

== See also ==
- 1984 Detroit Tigers season
- Tom Monaghan's Leaning Tower of Pizza
