= Ave Maria School of Law =

Catholic law school in Naples, Florida, US

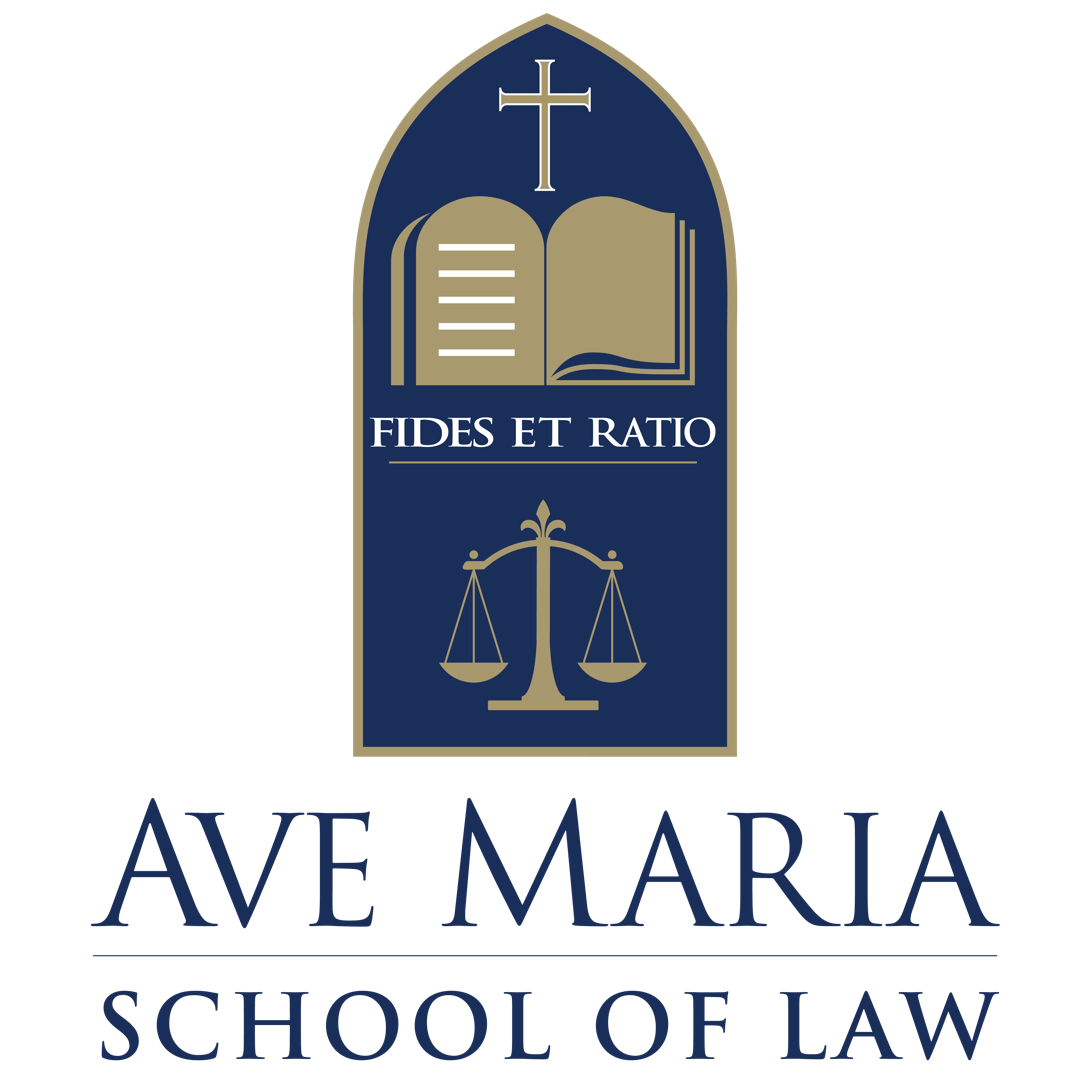
- Motto: Fides et Ratio; Faith and Reason
- Religious affiliation: Catholic
- Established: 1999; 27 years ago
- School type: Private law school
- Dean: John M. Czarnetzky
- Location: Naples, Florida; 26.242147°N 81.731321°W
- Enrollment: 334 (2025)
- Faculty: 43 full- and part-time
- USNWR ranking: 164 (tie) (2026)
- Bar pass rate: 77.46% (2025 first-time takers, all jurisdictions)
- Website: avemarialaw.edu

Ave Maria School of Law is a private Catholic law school in Naples, Florida. It was founded in 1999 and is accredited by the American Bar Association.

== History and governance ==
Ave Maria School of Law was founded in 1999, accepting its first class in 2000 in Ann Arbor, Michigan. The law school's beginnings lie in discussions between Tom Monaghan and disgruntled current and former faculty members of the University of Detroit Mercy School of Law, including future founding dean Bernard Dobranski, former dean at Detroit Mercy Law School and then dean of Catholic University of America Columbus School of Law, who complained that there were no "true Catholic" law schools. Monaghan supported the school through his Ave Maria Foundation and has served as the chairman of the board of governors of the school.

The founding board of governors included right-wing and pro-life religious and political figures including Henry Hyde, Edward Cardinal Egan, Robert P. George, Kate O'Beirne, Adam Cardinal Maida, Bowie Kuhn, Frank Joseph Dewane, and John Cardinal O'Connor. Robert Bork was an early faculty member and Antonin Scalia and Charles E. Rice consulted on the structure of the curriculum. Faculty and administrators are required to make a profession of faith and vow to follow Catholic teachings, the Magisterium, and the Holy See. In 2020, the school was described by the National Catholic Reporter as having "a more conservative religious orientation than any existing Catholic law school in the nation" and "militantly religious".

In 2002, Monaghan proposed a university campus at the Domino's Farms office park outside Ann Arbor to combine Ave Maria College and Ave Maria law school into Ave Maria University, including a 250-foot tall crucifix as a campus monument, but his plans were rejected by the Ann Arbor Township planning commission. After this rejection, and over extensive opposition from the school's administration, faculty, and students, Monaghan proposed to move the school from Ann Arbor to Florida. Following a purge by Monaghan of opposing administration and faculty members, the school moved from Ann Arbor to Florida in 2009. The initial plan was to co-locate the law school and university in Monaghan's proposed planned community Ave Maria, Florida, but after several years in leased temporary quarters in a former retirement home in Vineyards, in suburban Naples, Florida, the plan to co-locate in the city of Ave Maria was abandoned in 2015 and the law school purchased the facilities it had been leasing.

The law school was accredited by the ABA in 2005.

John Czarnetzky was named dean of the law school in May 2021.

== Academics ==
The school's curriculum combines a traditional legal education with an emphasis on how the law intersects with the Catholic intellectual tradition and natural law philosophy. All students are required to take courses in the moral foundations of the law, jurisprudence, and law, ethics and public policy. Faculty address moral issues in all courses, and explore them through Catholic or other religious teachings. As of 2025, the school had 28 full-time and 15 part-time faculty for 334 students.

=== Admissions ===
In 2025, the law school had an acceptance rate of 46.95% and an enrollment rate of 26.71% of admission offers. The 50th percentile LSAT score was 155 and the 50th percentile GPA was 3.36. The 25th to 75th percentile LSAT scores ranged from 152 to 158, and GPAs ranged from 3.07 to 3.66.

== Bar exam passage and employment ==
=== Bar passage ===
The law school had a first-time bar passage rate of 77.46%, with 77.00% passing in Florida, and 84.21% passing in other jurisdictions.

=== Employment ===
For 2025 graduates, 66 of 81 (81.48%) had full-time employment, and two had part time employment, in positions requiring bar passage (i.e. as attorneys), with 2 employed full-time in J.D. advantage positions. Two students were employed with a start date after March 16, 2026, three were not seeking employment, and six were still seeking employment.

=== Past ABA problems ===
In 2016, the school was sanctioned by the American Bar Association due to lax admissions standards. In February 2018, the ABA announced the lifting of the sanctions following remedial actions by the school. In 2022, the ABA's Section of Legal Education and Admissions to the Bar determined Ave Maria had failed to significantly comply with Standard 316, which was revised in 2019 to provide that at least 75% of an accredited law school's graduates who took a bar exam must pass one within two years of graduation. Graduates in 2019 had a 67.21% bar pass rate. However, Ave Maria had an 83.58% pass rate in 2018 and claimed a 2020 rate of 89.7%, and so the school expected the matter to be resolved with the council at its February 2023 meeting. The ABA determined the school was back in compliance by March 2023.

== Campus ==
The school is a converted former retirement community in Vineyards that it initially leased, and later purchased, from Ave Maria University. The campus consists of academic facilities in five buildings, and residence facilities in apartments and sixteen villa housing units. The law library was converted from the community center, with a large reading room developed from the central auditorium and with activity areas repurposed to hold the collections.

In addition to academic and administrative buildings, the campus includes the Cancro Family Wellness Center, a 21,740 square foot building. There is also on-campus housing for single students, families, faculty, and staff.

== Publications ==
The Ave Maria Law Review is published by students at Ave Maria School of Law. The school's moot court program publishes a magazine called The Gavel. The law school previously published The Ave Maria School of Law Advocate, a yearly publication for alumni. From 2009-2018, the school published the Ave Maria International Law Journal.

== Rankings ==
In 2025, U.S. News & World Report ranked Ave Maria 153 among U.S law schools. School leaders tout the school's perennial rankings as the "most conservative" and "most devout" law school in the US by surveys such as The Princeton Review and PreLaw Magazine.

The school was one of 114 private colleges nationwide to fail a federal financial responsibility test in 2007, 2008, and 2009. The school said its low asset-to-debt ratio was "typical of recently founded institutions" and "represents no change in our fiscal health and should not be cause for concern". In 2010, Ave Maria's Dean Milhizer stated that the school's finances were very strong and its fundraising results were improving.
