= WDEO (AM) =

- Ypsilanti, Michigan; United States
- Broadcast area: (Daytime) (Nighttime)
- Frequency: 990 kHz
- Branding: Ave Maria Radio

Programming
- Format: Religious; Catholic-based talk/sermons

Ownership
- Owner: Ave Maria Media Services

History
- First air date: November 16, 1962
- Former call signs: WYNZ (1962–1974); WYFC (1974-1986); WWCM (1986-1999)

Technical information
- Licensing authority: FCC
- Class: B
- Power: 9,200 watts (Daytime); 250 watts (Nighttime)
- Transmitter coordinates: 42°15′53″N 83°36′47″W (day); 42°15′55″N 83°46′42″W (night)
- Translators: W288DW (105.5 MHz, Southfield) (107.9 MHz) W300CO (Dexter)

Links
- Public license information: Public file; LMS
- Website: http://www.avemariaradio.net/

WDEO (990 kHz) is a radio station broadcasting on 990 kilohertz in Ypsilanti, Michigan. Broadcasting Catholic programming, WDEO is operated by Ave Maria Radio.

Most programming is locally produced, but some daytime content comes from the EWTN Global Catholic Radio Network.

== History ==
WDEO began operations in 1962 as WYNZ, a 250-watt daytimer on 1520 AM with a country format, which changed to Top 40 in 1964 and then religious programming in 1968. Two young DJs who would go on to long careers in radio started at WYNZ: 14-year-old Jim Kerr, who got on the air by selling airtime to local merchants; and John Huzar, a teenaged friend who took over Kerr's show one week. Kerr later spent over twenty years in New York as WPLJ's morning man (1974–96), while Huzar—better known as Jim Harper—became a Detroit radio legend, retiring from WMGC-FM at the end of 2011. (Harper returned to radio in 2017, doing a weekly show on WLXT in Petoskey, Michigan.)

In 1974, the station changed its calls to WYFC with the format remaining Christian-based. By the early 1980s, WYFC had become one of the first stations in the area to feature the emerging field of what would become known as contemporary Christian music. In late 1986, the station moved to its current 990 AM frequency and became WWCM (known as simply "WCM" on the air). The format remained Contemporary Christian. In the late 1990s, WWCM's daytime power increased to 9,200 watts, giving the station much better coverage of the metropolitan Detroit area. WCM also broadcast in AM Stereo (which was dropped after the station changed format).

Former Domino's Pizza owner Tom Monaghan purchased WWCM in 1999 and changed it to WDEO, using the same calls and Catholic format formerly heard on AM 1290 in Saline (now WLBY). The station's studios were also moved from their longtime location on Cross Street in Ypsilanti into the Domino's Farms complex near Ann Arbor.

== Ave Maria Radio ==
In addition to WDEO, Ave Maria Radio is heard on WMAX in Bay City and WLCM in Lansing. Ave Maria Radio also owns several translators in southeast Michigan including 107.9 W300CO Dexter, 105.5 W288DW Southfield, and 105.9 W290DM Midland. EWTN has long carried Ave Maria Radio programming including Catholic Connection with Teresa Tomeo and Kresta in the Afternoon with Al Kresta. Kresta died on June 15, 2024.

=== Programming ===
Ave Maria Radio produces Catholic local and nationally syndicated Catholic radio programming. Its national offerings include current event and culture programs Catholic Connection with Teresa Tomeo and Ave Maria in the Afternoon with Dr. Marcus Peter. Other programs include lifestyle and family counseling programs More2Life with Dr. Greg and Lisa Popcak and The Doctor is In with Dr. Ray Guarendi. These programs are syndicated through the EWTN Global Catholic Radio Network to more than 350 AM and FM stations across the United States. These programs are also carried on EWTN's SiriusXM channel.

Ave Maria Radio produces a wide variety of programming for its stations in Michigan, including local events and news programs such as Epiphany with Vanessa Denha Garmo and Michigan Mornings^{®} with Matthew Handley. It also creates programs hosted by members of Renewal Ministries and other Catholic music programs also.

== See also ==
- Media in Detroit
