= Rhodora J. Donahue Academy of Ave Maria =

Private, coeducational school in Ave Maria, Florida

Location
- 4955 Seton Way; Ave Maria, (Collier County), Florida 34142; United States
- 26°20′27″N 81°26′7″W

Information
- Type: Private, Coeducational
- Motto: Christum Novisse Virtutem Contendere
- Religious affiliation: Roman Catholic
- Established: 2007
- Grades: K–12
- Colors: Blue and Green
- Team name: Shamrocks
- Accreditation: Middle States Association of Colleges and Schools
- Athletic Director: Janet Deliso
- Website: www.donahueacademy.org

Rhodora J. Donahue Academy of Ave Maria is a private, Roman Catholic K-12 school in Ave Maria, Florida. Founded as Ave Maria Grammar and Preparatory School, it was initially independent of the Diocese of Venice, Florida. On May 12, 2017, the Diocese of Venice in Florida announced its plan to purchase Rhodora J. Donahue Academy and convert it into a Diocesan Parochial School. Documentation of the transfer was recorded with the Collier County Clerk's office on July 6, 2017. The school has been listed on the Catholic Education Honor Roll as a School of Excellence. The founding headmaster in 2007 was Dr. Daniel Guernsey, who left the academy in 2013 to head up the Education program at Ave Maria University, and who was hired by the diocese in 2017 to return to the academy as its principal.

== History ==
The school was established in 2007 as the Ave Maria Grammar and Preparatory School.

== Athletics ==
The sports teams are nicknamed the "Shamrocks."

Sports offered are 8-man football, basketball, baseball, cross country, track, softball, volleyball, and soccer.

In 2016, the Donahue Academy Shamrocks had a record of 11 wins and zero losses, winning the 2016 Florida FCAPPS 8-man Football State Championship Title game.

== Shakespeare Program ==
One of the hallmarks of Donahue Academy has been the Shakespeare program founded in 2015 by Peter Atkinson, a graduate of Ave Maria University. Atkinson's performance model was based on his experience as a performer in Ave Maria University's Shakespeare in Performance program. His teaching model was based on that of Shakespeare & Company. In 2017, Atkinson left his teaching position to pursue further education at Columbia University. Robert Gotschall, another former member of the Shakespeare in Performance program, who had previously taught at Mason Classical Academy in Naples, took charge of the program.

Productions:

- 2016: Romeo and Juliet
- 2017: As You Like It
- 2018: A Midsummer Night's Performance
