= WLCM =

Holt, Michigan; United States
- Broadcast area: Lansing-East Lansing metropolitan area
- Frequency: 1390 kHz

Programming
- Format: Catholic
- Network: Ave Maria Radio
- Affiliations: EWTN Radio

Ownership
- Owner: Ave Maria Media Services

History
- First air date: August 25, 1956
- Former call signs: WCER (1956–1980); WGWY (1980–1986); WLNF (1986–1992); WNNY (1992)
- Call sign meaning: "Lansing's Christian Messenger" (derived from former format)

Technical information
- Licensing authority: FCC
- Facility ID: 42076
- Class: B
- Power: 5,000 watts (day); 4,500 watts (night)
- Transmitter coordinates: 42°34′2″N 84°51′58″W (day); 42°33′7″N 84°33′5″W (night)

Links
- Public license information: Public file; LMS
- Webcast: Listen live
- Website: www.avemariaradio.net

WLCM (1390 AM) is a commercial radio station licensed to Holt, Michigan, United States, and serving the Lansing-East Lansing metropolitan area. It airs a Catholic radio format owned and operated by Ave Maria Radio via Ave Maria Media Services, and also carries EWTN Radio programming. Studios are located on Lawrence Highway in Charlotte. WLCM operates from two transmitter sites; the daytime facility is in Charlotte and the nighttime facility is in Holt.

As of December 2024, the station was in the process of being sold to Catholic broadcaster Ave Maria Radio for $200,000. By December 2025, WLCM is airing Ave Maria programming and is listed on Ave Maria's website as an affiliate station.

== History ==
The station signed on the air on August 25, 1956. It was founded by McLean and Craig Davids as WCER. The call letters stood for Charlotte and Eaton Rapids. WCER was a typical small town station with middle of the road (MOR) music, local news and features. WCER's FM station at 92.7 later became the original frequency of legendary classic rocker WMMQ, and is now WLMI at 92.9.

In 1979, WCER-FM switched to an automated Adult Contemporary music format with the call sign WMMQ. The following year the AM station was sold to Sharon Communications and the call sign became WGWY. The call letters stood for Where God Wants You and the station had a Contemporary Christian format. In 1983, the format changed to traditional Christian music. Throughout both formats, the programming included the Farm Report, which gave grain, livestock, and other agricultural pricing and news. There was also local news and sports that included live, on-site broadcasts; music; weather readings from ticker-tape; regional, state, and national news from ticker-tape; and music spun from vinyl 78s and 45s, as well as from cassettes. Pre-programmed shows purchased from sources such as National Public Radio member stations, were played both from cassettes as well as live. Non-musical advertisements were written and performed by staff, which included everyone from the station manager to the receptionist. Air time for the AM station was from 4:00 a.m. to 9:00 p.m. Throughout this time period, the WGWY and WMMQ shared facilities at the Charlotte studio, although the stations were separately owned and operated.

In 1986 the FM call sign was changed to WLNF.

ERC Media purchased the station in 1992 and began a short-lived country music format with the call sign WNNY. The next year the station was purchased by Jon Yinger who switched it back to a religious format as WLCM. WLCM stands for Lansing's Christian Messenger.

WLCM is in the process of being purchased by Catholic talk radio network Ave Maria Radio for $250,000. The deal also gives Ave Maria right of first refusal to acquire the station's real estate for $200,000. Ava Maria's flagship station is WDEO in Ann Arbor and features programming from the EWTN network. The purchase brings an end to months of speculation as to which radio station in the market Ava Maria was purchasing.

As of December 2025, WLCM is airing Ave Maria programming.

== Sources ==
- Diane Faulkner, on-air pseudonym at WGWY, Kaye Quinn, was one of the broadcasters on WGWY from 1982 through 1983 and is now a broadcaster at 89.9 WJCT's Radio Reading Service, a National Public Radio affiliate, in Jacksonville, Florida.
