= Domino's Farms =

Office park in Ann Arbor Township, Michigan, headquarters of Domino's Pizza

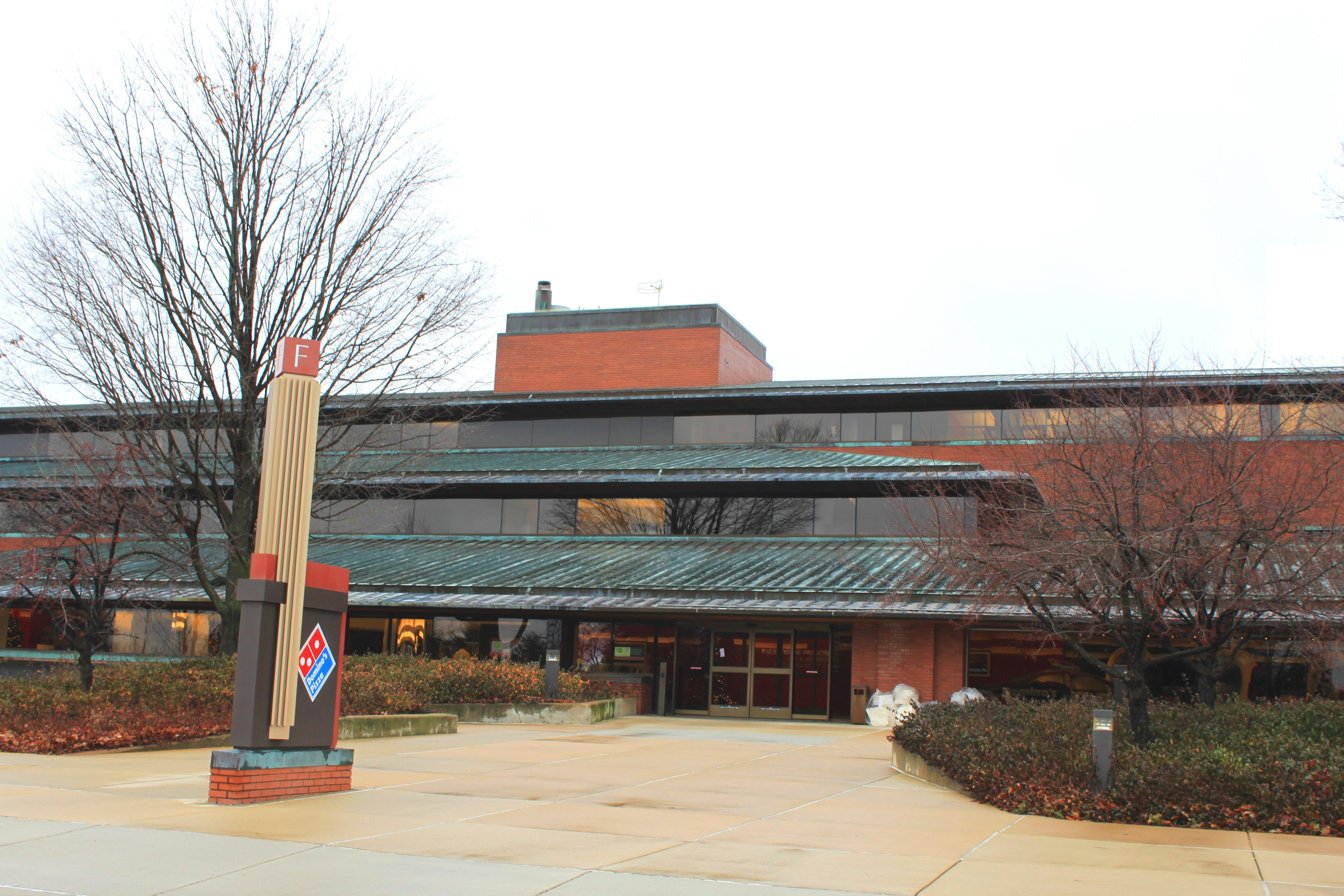
- Main entrance to the Domino's corporate headquarters in Lobby F of the Prairie House
- Interactive map of Domino's Farms
- Location: Ann Arbor Township, Michigan
- Coordinates: 42°19′02″N 83°40′58″W
- Use: Office park
- Website: dominosfarms.com

Companies
- Architect: Gunnar Birkerts
- Owner: Tom Monaghan

Technical details
- Size: Approximately 300 acres (120 ha)
- Parking: 2,800 spaces

Domino's Farms is an office park in Ann Arbor Charter Township, Michigan, centered around a four-story, 1/2-mile-long (0.80 km), Prairie style groundscraper known as the "Prairie House". Domino's Pizza founder Tom Monaghan commissioned the complex in the early 1980s to serve as the company's headquarters, and Monaghan remains the owner of the complex after selling his stake in Domino's in 1998. The complex was designed by Gunnar Birkerts in the style of Frank Lloyd Wright, whom Monaghan admired.

Construction began in 1984, and the sixth and final phase of the Prairie House was fully completed in 2005. Michigan Medicine is a major tenant of the complex, which also includes test kitchens for Domino's and a petting zoo.

Early concepts for the approximately 300-acre (120 ha) site, located just east of the Ann Arbor city limits, included a circular layout for the campus and a 30-story skyscraper. These plans were refined into the linear configuration that was eventually built. A scale model of the unbuilt skyscraper, nicknamed the "Leaning Tower of Pizza," stands in a field on the west side of the campus. Another unbuilt concept for Domino's Farms included a campus of Ave Maria University, a Catholic university founded by Monaghan that instead moved to Collier County, Florida, in the mid-2000s.

== History and design ==
Monaghan gained an admiration for Wright at the age of 12, when he checked out a book about Wright from a public library in Traverse City. Wright died in 1959, and Monaghan started a collection of furnishings and parts from demolished Wright buildings in the late 1970s. By 1990, the collection was valued at $20 million, with 350 items.

Monaghan entered the pizza business when he and his brother bought a pizzeria in Ypsilanti in 1960. Monaghan bought out the entire business shortly afterwards, refocused it on delivery, and renamed it Domino's Pizza. The company began expanding by franchising in 1967, and 44 stores were in operation by 1969. The company grew rapidly, and narrowly avoided bankruptcy before growing to over 1,100 stores in 1983. Domino's moved its corporate headquarters multiple times due to its rapid growth, eventually settling on a site on Green Road on the northeast side of Ann Arbor.

As Domino's grew in size, Monaghan developed plans for a new headquarters near Ann Arbor. Initially, Monaghan wanted to construct a skyscraper called the Golden Beacon, a 56-story design that was proposed for a site in Chicago but never built. Monaghan contacted Taliesin Associated Architects, the firm operated by former Wright associates who held the rights to many of his designs, but the parties were unable to reach an agreement. A 1988 analysis in The New York Times suspected that the disagreement was not a business conflict, but a matter of passion, commenting that the agreement may have failed because "each party may have felt specially imbued with the great architect's spirit".

Monaghan bought a large plot of land in Ann Arbor Charter Township in 1983. The parcel of land had been farmed by the Zeeb family for decades, and was close to the amenities of Ann Arbor while still retaining a semi-rural setting. The initial land purchase excluded the house occupied since 1921 by longtime resident Florence Zeeb. Monaghan's vision for the property included a working farm on part of the land, evoking Ann Arbor's historic Cobblestone Farm.

Gunnar Birkerts designed the complex in the style of Wright, who died in 1959. Monaghan admired Wright's style, and requested that Birkerts utilize six Wright-inspired design elements in his design: "low-slung buildings, overhangs, brick, copper, wood, and berms". Birkerts found the design process difficult, commenting in 1994 that "[i]n terms of my synthesizing process, the headquarters for Domino's was the most difficult project of my life because I had to work with someone else's architecture."

Construction of Domino's Farms began in 1984. At the time, the site was sufficiently remote that it was outside the delivery area of the nearest Domino's Pizza location, leading a crew of ironworkers to order Little Caesars instead, to the disappointment of the project managers. Construction on the Prairie House occurred in phases, with the first four-story building completed in 1985. The next phases were completed in the late 1980s, constructing warehouse, kitchen, and museum spaces.

== Layout ==
The Domino's Farms campus is located in Washtenaw County, northeast of the Ann Arbor city limits in Ann Arbor Charter Township. The main entrance to the campus is from Plymouth Road to the south, with additional access from the north and east.

=== Prairie House ===
Prairie House
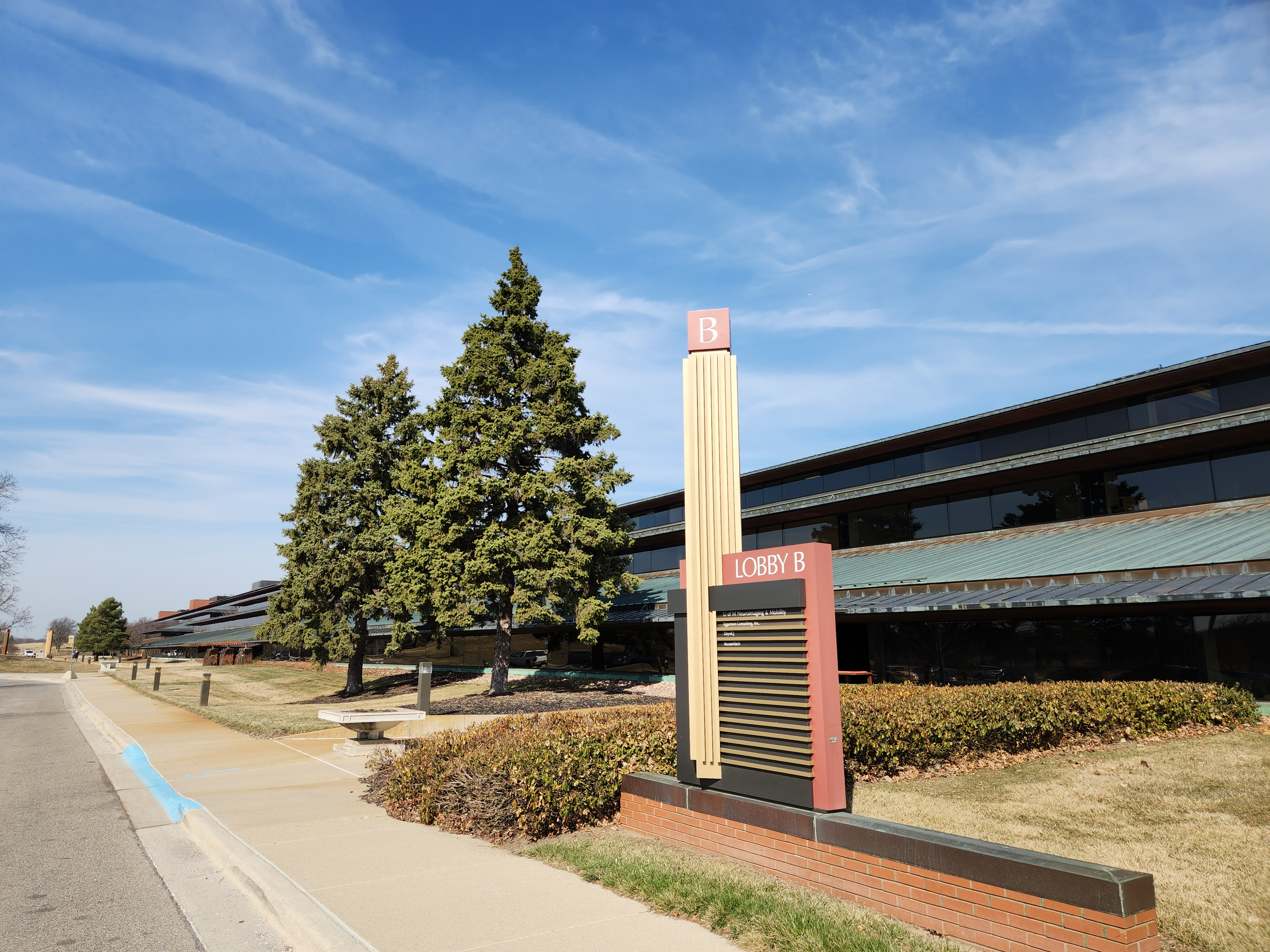
- Lobby B of the Prairie House
- Interactive map of the Prairie House area

General information
- Type: Groundscraper
- Architectural style: Prairie Style
- Construction started: 1984
- Completed: 2005

Technical details
- Floor count: 4
- Floor area: Approximately 1 million square feet (93,000 m^{2})

Design and construction
- Architect: Gunnar Birkerts
- Main contractor: Barton Malow (phase 1-5); DeMattia Group (phase 6)

The main feature of the campus is the 1/2-mile-long (0.80 km) four-story Prairie Style groundscraper, named the Prairie House, which runs north-south through the entire campus. The Prairie House was built in six phases over the course of over 20 years, and was fully completed in 2005.

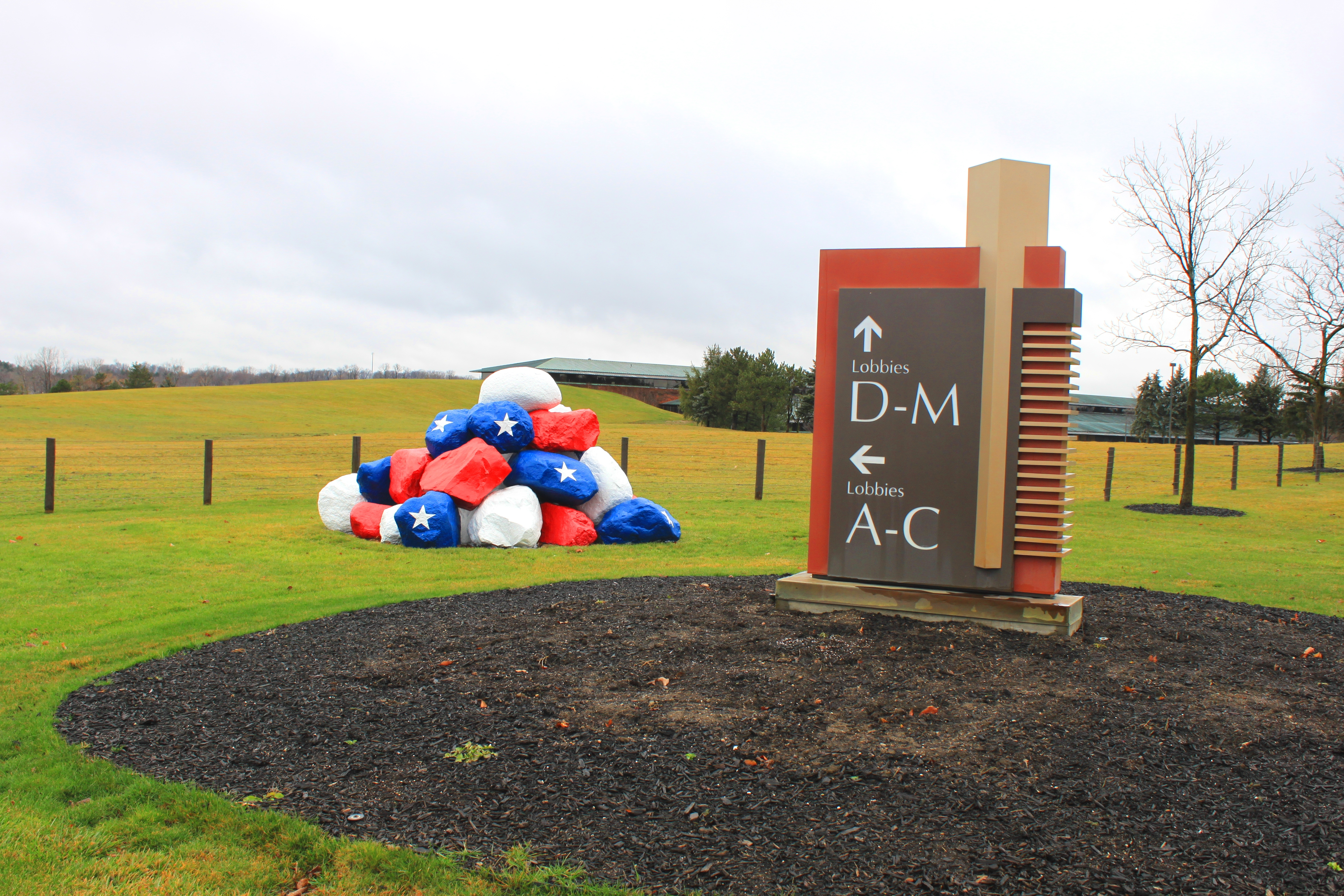
The ends of the Prairie House blend into the surrounding landscape with large berms, evoking a classic Wright style

Exterior access is through 10 lobbies, two of which are dedicated to Domino's. A lower-level interior corridor, nicknamed "Main Street", runs through the entire building. The steel-framed structure is clad in brick with overhanging copper roofs. Its linear form is designed to blend into the surrounding landscape, with large berms at the ends of the structure that disguise its true size.

==== Tenants ====
Domino's has its world headquarters in the Prairie House. Michigan Medicine operates 17 clinics at Domino's Farms, including sports medicine, plastic surgery, and a Japanese-language family medicine practice. The Thomas More Law Center also has its offices in Domino's Farms.

=== Farms and natural features ===
==== Bison herd ====
Domino's Farms is home to a herd of bison, which are shown at regional and national competitions. The bison were part of Monaghan's personal vision for Domino's Farms, and the complex's logo is an artistic rendering of a bison. The first bison arrived on the property in 1993. As of 2024, the herd consists of approximately 75 animals.

==== Petting Farm ====
The Domino's Farms Petting Farm is a petting zoo on the north side of the complex, featuring over 200 animals. It features the original barn and farmhouse from the Zeeb farm, which were moved to their current location in 1989.

=== Campus ===
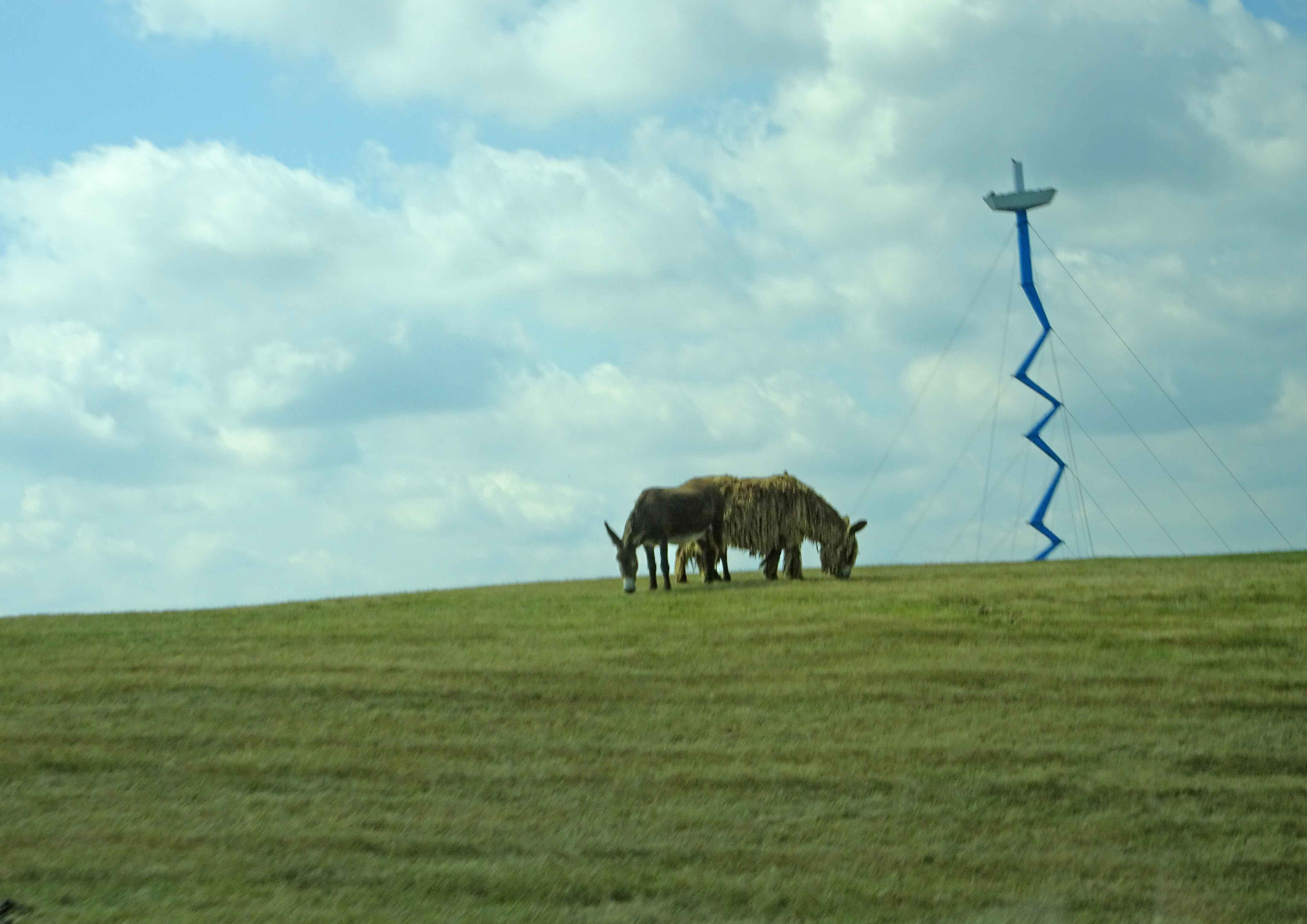
Grazing animals and the cell tower viewed from US Highway 23

Ann Arbor Public Schools has its district offices in a 55,000-square-foot (5,100 m^{2}) building on the campus, adjacent to the Petting Farm. The school district purchased the building in 2022, and intends to convert it to a school or a preschool in the future.

The Domino's Innovation Garage, located on the western portion of the campus, opened in 2019 to support the company's store layout prototypes and autonomous vehicle projects. The Innovation Garage houses 150 staff, and is not open to the public.

The western portion of the campus features a distinctive blue lightning bolt-shaped cell tower, which was installed in 1997. AirTouch Cellular (now Verizon Wireless) proposed and financed the tower. The tower was designed by Birkerts, following negotiations about its aesthetics between Monaghan and AirTouch. The 165-foot (50 m) tower is equipped with a lighting system that illuminates its guy wires at night.

== Unbuilt concepts ==
=== Golden Beacon ===
Before the plans for Domino's Farms were finalized, Monaghan asked Taliesin Associated Architects, the inheritors of Frank Lloyd Wright's practice, to erect a structure based on an un-built tower that Wright designed in 1956 for Chicago called the Golden Beacon. During the planning of the tower, Monaghan and the Taliesin architects parted company, allegedly because both parties felt the project may have not served justice to the spirit of Wright's architecture.

=== Leaning Tower of Pizza ===
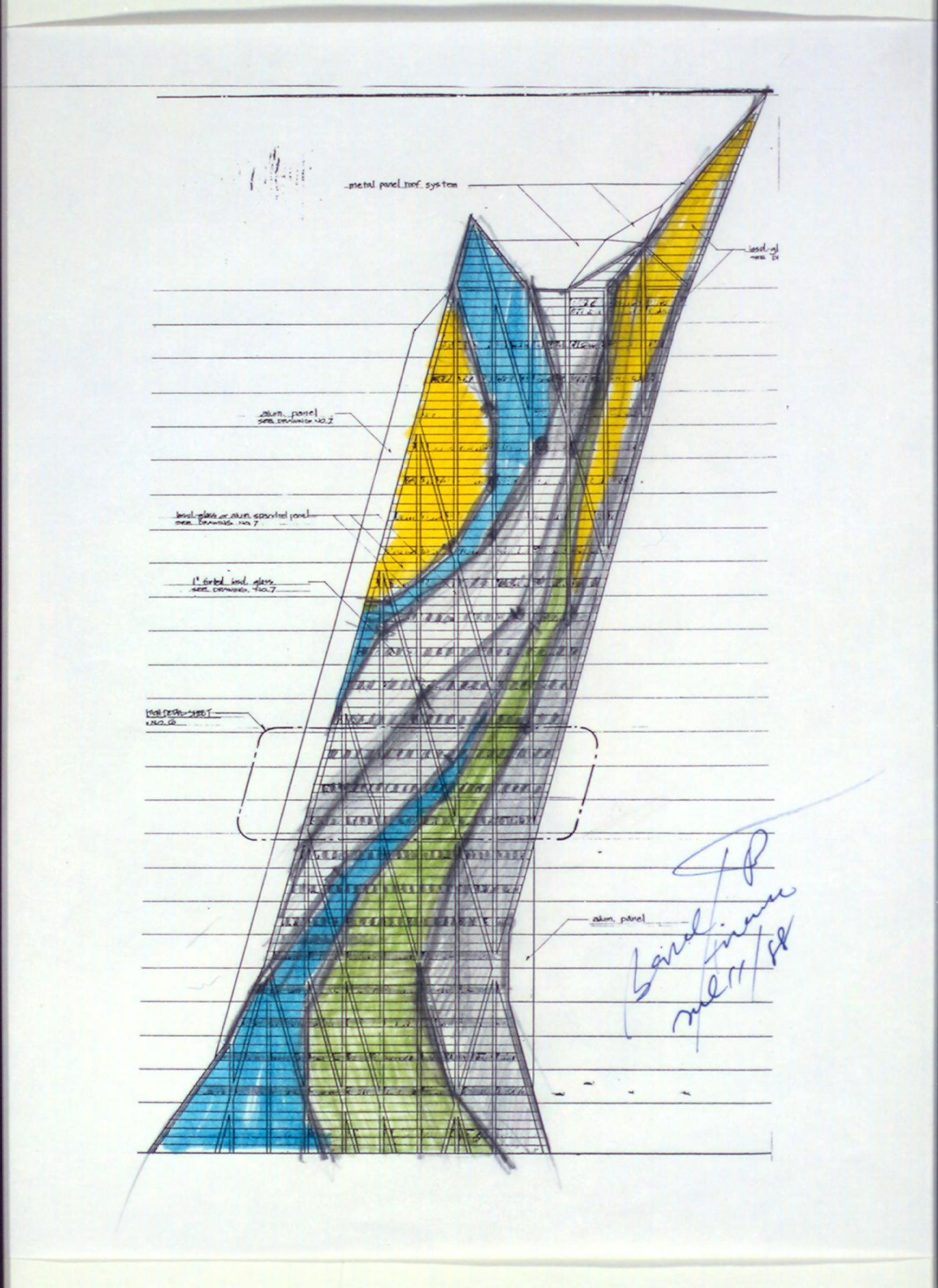
1988 preliminary design drawing by Gunnar Birkerts for a skyscraper on the property, nicknamed the "Leaning Tower of Pizza"

Birkerts designed a second concept for a skyscraper, which was nicknamed the "Leaning Tower of Pizza" by the press. The 30-story structure progressed to the design phase, but was never built. The structure encountered issues during the design process, which specified a 15-degree slant. Birkerts struggled to find a way to install elevators in the building due to the structure's slant, and he felt that the design counteracted some of the Wright-inspired components of the Prairie House. Monaghan commissioned a scale model of the design to be built at Domino's Farms, which still stands in 2025.

=== Ave Maria University ===
Monaghan founded Ave Maria College, a Catholic liberal arts college in 1998 in a former elementary school in Ypsilanti. The school expanded quickly, and the Ave Maria School of Law opened in Ann Arbor in 2000. Monaghan planned to build a campus for the college and the law school at Domino's Farms, which was to include a 250-foot (76 m) crucifix facing US Highway 23.

Ann Arbor Township zoning officials rejected Monaghan's proposal in 2002. Later that year, Monaghan announced that the school would move to a newly-constructed campus in Collier County in Southwest Florida, causing controversy at the college and the law school. Faculty and board members of the law school objected to the move, and filed lawsuits and complaints with the American Bar Association. The college remained open in Ypsilanti through 2007, with an enrollment of only three students in its final year. Ave Maria University fully reopened in the master-planned, Catholic-oriented town of Ave Maria, Florida in 2008.
