= Keiser University-Latin American Campus =

Coordinates: 11.90700°N 86.20470°W

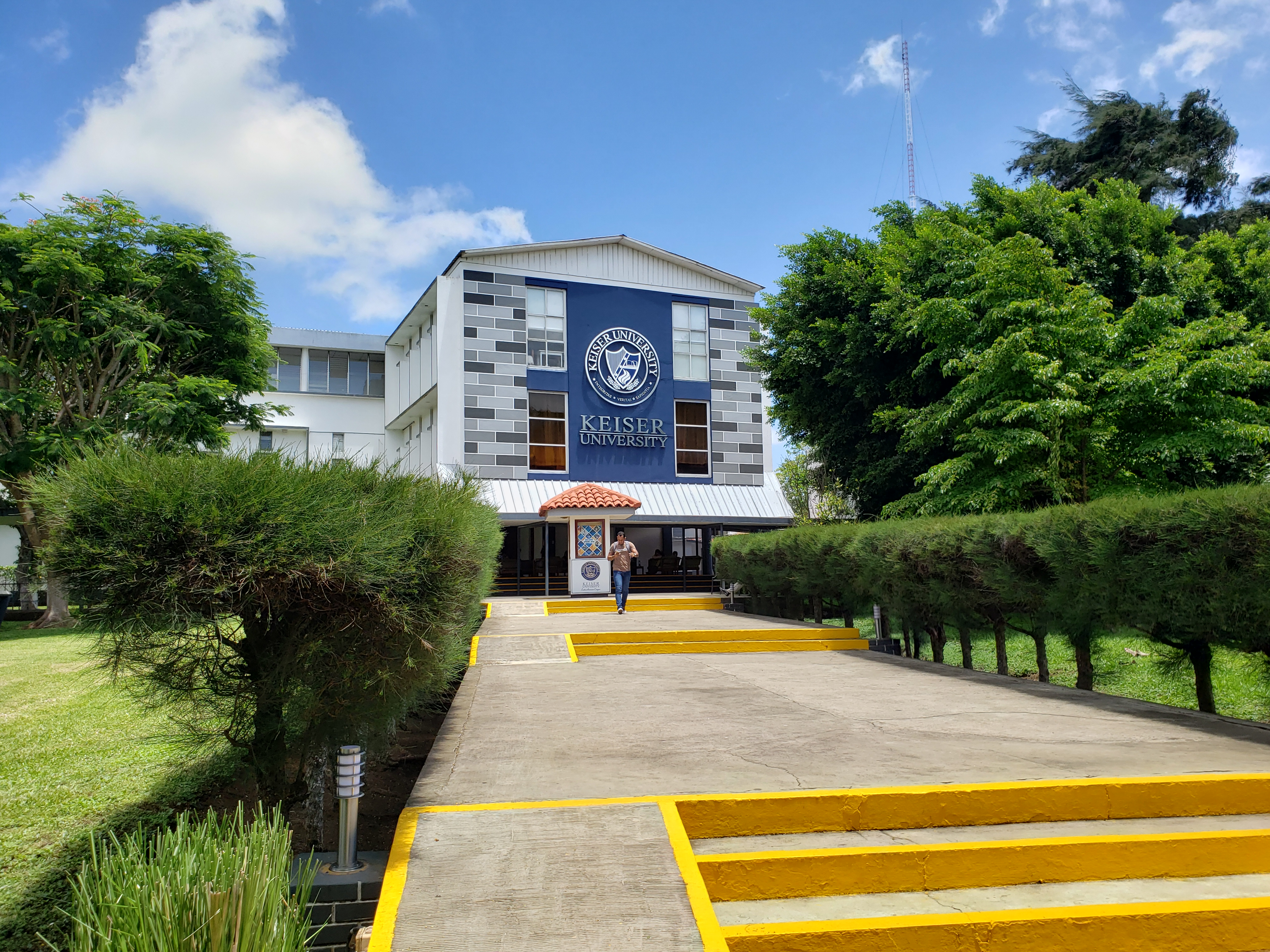
- Keiser University Latin American Campus, located in San Marcos, Nicaragua
- Former names: University of Mobile-Latin American Campus (1993–2000); Ave Maria College of the Americas (2000–2007); Ave Maria University-Latin American Campus (2007–2013); Keiser University-Latin American Campus (2013)
- Motto: Integritas, Veritas, Sapientia
- Motto in English: Purity, Truth, Wisdom
- Type: Private
- Established: 1993
- Chancellor: Dr. Arthur Keiser
- President: Mathew Anderson
- Dean: Douglas Arroliga
- Location: San Marcos, Nicaragua
- Website: keiseruniversity.edu.ni

Keiser University - Latin American Campus (KU) is a branch campus of Keiser University in Florida, United States. It is located in the small town of San Marcos, Carazo, Nicaragua.

== History ==
The school uses the campus formerly belonging to La Antigua Escuela Normal de Señoritas de San Marcos. From its founding in 1993, this school operated under the name University of Mobile, Latin American Campus in San Marcos and was operated by the University of Mobile. Ave Maria College acquired the school from the University of Mobile on July 1, 2000. The school was then called Ave Maria College of the Americas until it became the branch campus for Ave Maria University in 2007. The Latin American Campus was acquired by the Keiser University on July 1, 2013.
