= Suzanne Kresta =

Canadian chemical engineer

Suzanne Marie Kresta is a Canadian chemical engineer known for her research on mixing in turbulent fluids including drinking water, molten metals, and in industrial processes. She is dean of the Faculty of Sustainable Design Engineering at the University of Prince Edward Island, and a professor emerita in the Department of Chemical and Biological Engineering and former dean of the College of Engineering at the University of Saskatchewan.

== Education and career ==
Kresta is originally from Charlottetown on Prince Edward Island; her mother and uncle were on the faculty of the University of Prince Edward Island. She was an undergraduate at the University of New Brunswick, graduating in 1986. After a 1987 master's degree in England at the University of Leeds she returned to Canada for a doctorate at McMaster University, completed in 1992.

She was a faculty member at the University of Alberta beginning in 1992, promoted to associate professor in 1993 and full professor in 1996. She was McCalla Professor in 2008–2009 and Killam Annual Professor in 2012. She became associate dean of graduate studies there in 2015 before moving to the University of Saskatchewan as dean of engineering in 2018. In 2024 she moved again, to her present position as dean of the Faculty of Sustainable Design Engineering at the University of Prince Edward Island.

== Books ==
Kresta co-edited the Handbook of Industrial Mixing: Science and Practice (Wiley, 2003, with Edward L. Paul and Victor A. Atiemo-Obeng). She was the chief editor of Advances in Industrial Mixing (2015), a companion to the Handbook of Industrial Mixing.

== Recognition ==
Kresta is a 2014 Fellow of Engineers Canada, a 2016 Fellow of the American Institute of Chemical Engineers (AIChE), and a 2018 Fellow of the Canadian Academy of Engineering.

She was a 2004 recipient of the Senior Moulton Medal of the Institution of Chemical Engineers (IChemE), the 2006 recipient of the Syncrude Canada Innovation Award of the Canadian Society for Chemical Engineering, the 2008 recipient of the NAMF Forum Award for Excellence and Sustained Contributions to Mixing Research and Practice of AIChE, and the 2014 recipient of the Medal for Distinction in Engineering Education of Engineers Canada.

Her book Handbook of Industrial Mixing was recognized in the 2004 PROSE Awards as the best scholarly or technical book in engineering in 2004.
