= Ave Maria University =

Catholic university in Ave Maria, Florida, US

Coordinates: 26.33649°N 81.43987°W

- Former name: Ave Maria College (1999–2003)
- Motto: Ex Corde Ecclesiae (Latin); Veritatis Splendor (Latin)
- Motto in English: From the Heart of the Church; The Splendor of Truth
- Type: Private university
- Established: 1998; 28 years ago
- Religious affiliation: Catholic
- Academic affiliations: ACCU; ICUF; CIC
- Chancellor: Tom Monaghan
- President: Mark Middendorf
- Provost: Roger Nutt
- Academic staff: 107 (2022)
- Students: 1,311 (2022)
- Location: Ave Maria, Florida, United States
- Campus: Rural, 1,000 acres (4.0 km^{2})
- Colors: Tanzanite Blue & Gold (academics) Navy Blue & Kelly Green (athletics)
- Nickname: Gyrenes
- Sporting affiliations: NAIA – The Sun
- Website: avemaria.edu

Ave Maria University (AMU) is a private Catholic university in Ave Maria, Florida, United States. It existed formerly as Ave Maria College in Ypsilanti, Michigan, which was founded in 1998 and reestablished in 2007 along with an interim Naples, Florida campus (first named Ave Maria University) created in 2003. The school was founded by philanthropist and entrepreneur Tom Monaghan. In 2024, the enrollment was 1,326 students. In 2016 its student body was 80% Catholic.

== History ==
=== Ave Maria College ===
Ave Maria College was founded by Catholic philanthropist and former Domino's Pizza owner and founder Tom Monaghan on March 19, 1998, occupying two former elementary school buildings in Ypsilanti, Michigan, near the campus of Eastern Michigan University.

Monaghan's goal was to create a Catholic university faithful to the magisterium of the Catholic Church, providing a liberal arts education in a Catholic environment. He originally intended to construct a full college campus on his 280-acre (1.1 km^{2}) property in nearby Ann Arbor Township, known as Domino's Farms. The plan for the Ann Arbor campus also included a 25-story crucifix, which was never built.

=== Interim Naples campus ===
After being denied zoning approval by Ann Arbor Township to build a larger campus near Domino's Farms, Monaghan decided to move the college to Florida. Monaghan initiated the founding of Ave Maria University with a donation of $250 million. In August 2003, the university opened an interim campus in The Vineyards in Naples, Florida, enrolling some 100 undergraduate students, 75 of whom were freshmen. While occupying the interim campus, Monaghan focused efforts on constructing a new campus and planned community nearby known as Ave Maria, Florida. The Barron Collier family donated the land in southwest Florida for the campus, joining Monaghan in the enterprise as 50% partner.

While the infrastructure of the new campus and town were being completed in early 2007, the Ypsilanti campus was also closing at the end of the 2006–2007 academic year. Monaghan planned to have most of the staff transferred to the Florida location. The Michigan location remained open until students graduated or transferred, leaving just three students for the final year and a number of the remaining staff.

=== Ave Maria campus ===
The university moved from the temporary facility to the new campus in 2007. In its first year at the new campus, the university enrolled about 450 undergraduates and 150 graduate students. Frank Dewane, the Bishop of Venice in Florida, formally dedicated the university in 2008.

In March 2007, Monaghan dismissed the university's original provost, Joseph Fessio because of what Monaghan described as "irreconcilable differences over administrative policies and practices". Immediately, the school's first-ever student protests were mounted in support of Fessio. Outside observers were critical: editor Philip F. Lawler of the conservative Catholic World News said the firing was "institutional suicide", and that if a respected theologian such as Fessio could be fired then no others would want to fill the position. Monaghan reinstated Fessio the next day as theologian-in-residence. He was dismissed from that position in 2009, stating he was fired the second time because of a conversation he had with Academic Vice President Jack Sites about administrative policies harming the university's finances. He said his firing was "another mistake in a long series of unwise decisions" but that he would continue to guide students to AMU.

Monaghan planned to continue to expand the university and hoped to one day have an enrollment over 5,000, Division I athletics and an academic reputation as "a Catholic Ivy", however as of 2024, only had about 20 percent of this goal. The university's growth has fallen short of its stated goal of "growing the University's undergraduate enrollment at its main campus in Florida to approximately 1,700 students by the fall of 2016" and 1,500 by the year 2020.

In 2011, James Towey, former Director of the White House Office of Faith-Based and Community Initiatives and former President of Saint Vincent College, was unanimously voted President of Ave Maria University by the AMU Board of Trustees. He also assumed the role of CEO in place of Monaghan, who remains the Chancellor.

The 2008 financial crisis took a toll on Ave Maria's finances. Monaghan said in 2012 that Ave Maria's construction cost estimates doubled over three years, requiring the university to cut back on planned buildings. The troubled Florida real estate market also meant that Ave Maria School of Law had to shelve plans for a building, as its existing campus was worth less than was paid for it. According to Towey, for a period of time the university survived through Monaghan's funding of a $10 million annual deficit. Towey credits his efforts at controlling financing costs, along with increased contributions, with placing the university back on a firm financial footing by 2014.

In February 2012, Ave Maria made national news when it filed Ave Maria University v. Sebelius, suing the government over the US Health and Human Services birth control mandate by claiming it would force the university to forego its religious freedom. It became the second college to do so, and was followed by several others, including the Franciscan University of Steubenville and the University of Notre Dame. The lawsuit is represented by the Becket Fund for Religious Liberty. In June 2012, President Towey wrote that the university would "vigorously prosecute its lawsuit". In 2016, the Supreme Court unanimously sent the case back to a federal appeals court to find a solution that would both honor religious organizations objections and provide their employees with birth control. Ave Maria administrators celebrated the decision as a "great victory".

The university ran a satellite campus in Nicaragua, the Ave Maria University-Latin American Campus, for 13 years, and then sold it to Keiser University in July 2013.

== Founder's goals ==
In a May 2004 speech, Monaghan expressed his wish to have the new town and university campus be free from pre-marital sex, contraceptives and pornography. This elicited sharply critical statements from the international press, who saw such proposed restrictions as violations of civil liberties. Howard Simon, executive director of the American Civil Liberties Union branch in Florida, challenged the legality of the restriction of sales of contraceptives. He said, "This is not just about the sale of contraceptives in the local pharmacy, it is about whether in an incorporated town there will be a fusion of religion and government." An opinion column in The Wall Street Journal quoted an Ave Maria faculty member who called it a "Catholic Jonestown". Frances Kissling of Catholics for Choice compared Monaghan's civic vision to Islamic fundamentalism, and called it "un-American". In response, Monaghan announced a milder form of civic planning in which the town could mostly grow on its own, except that it would not have sex shops or strip clubs, and store owners would be asked rather than ordered not to sell contraceptives or porn. Contraception and porn would still be banned from the university.

== Academics ==
Ave Maria University offers 33 undergraduate and 3 graduate degrees. Graduate programs include M.A. and Ph.D. studies in theology and a Master of Theological Studies for non-traditional students. Undergraduate students must complete a core curriculum of 14 required courses in philosophy, theology, composition, science, math, history, political science, and a foreign language.

The Honor Society of Phi Kappa Phi installed Ave Maria University as its 358th chapter on October 17, 2023.

In 2023 U.S. News & World Report reported that the university enrolled 1,021 undergraduate students paying an average of $28,224 for the school year 2022-2023. Faculty student ratio was 18:1.

=== Accreditation ===
In June 2010, the Commission on Colleges of the Southern Association of Colleges and Schools (SACS) declared that Ave Maria had obtained "accredited membership" status. This allows the university to award bachelors, masters, and doctoral degrees accredited by the SACS. The university had previously received full accreditation from the American Academy for Liberal Education (AALE) in June 2008. On October 7, 2011, the local ordinary, Bishop Frank Joseph Dewane, formally recognized the institution as a Catholic university pursuant to the code of canon law.

=== Honors College ===
The Honors College at AMU was founded on January 9, 2026, as a successor to the Honors Program, founded in 2012. The highly selective college offers students "enriching and stimulating Honors core courses that are smaller than regular sections and taught by select professors," as well as academic, cultural, and spiritual formation.

=== Catholic Theology Show ===
The Catholic Theology Show, a faculty podcast, began on October 22, 2022, hosted by Michael Dauphinais, chair of the Theology Department and professor of theology. The Catholic Theology Show was launched on the feast day of Saint Pope John Paul II.

=== Study abroad ===
Ave Maria University offered study abroad programs in Gaming, Austria, and in San Marcos, Nicaragua. Instruction was conducted in English. The Austrian program required an additional $1,750 beyond regular tuition, along with the added expense of airfare and ground transportation, while the Nicaraguan program required no additional tuition. Ave Maria's Nicaraguan program was discontinued in mid-2013, with the site transferred to Keiser University to become Keiser University-Latin American Campus.

=== Rankings ===
Ave Maria University was ranked #156-201 in National Liberal Arts Colleges by U.S. News & World Report in 2022-23.

== Campus ==
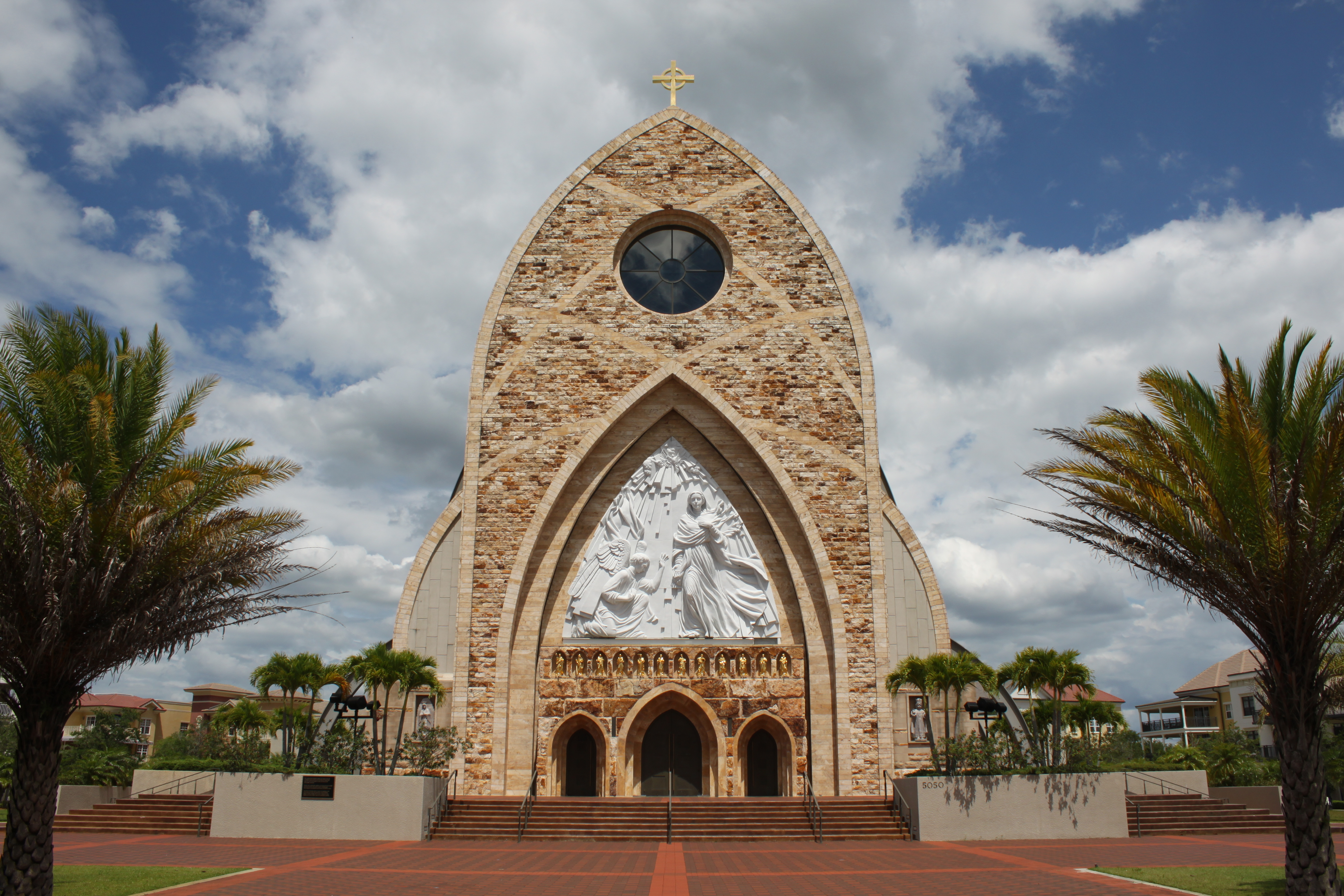
The Ave Maria Catholic Church, originally named The Oratory, is the center of the town of Ave Maria

The new campus is located in the town of Ave Maria, Florida, 17 miles (27 km) east of Naples in rural Collier County. The town site occupies about 5,000 acres (20 km^{2}), of which nearly 20 percent are designated for the campus. The Ave Maria Oratory, a large Gothic-inspired structure located at the center of town, was constructed by the university and currently serves as the parish church. Several more master-planned communities are under construction or planned in the immediately surrounding area, north and south of the campus. Managed wetlands lie north and west of the campus. Wildlife preservation and restoration projects have also been instituted on the site, to preserve a degree of its natural state.

=== Recognition ===
Ave Maria University won the 2007 'Digie Award' (Commercial Real Estate Digital Innovation Award). The $24 million Oratory won the 2008 TCA Achievement Award as well as an award from the American Institute of Steel Construction.

=== Canizaro Library ===
The Canizaro Library holds over 215,000 volumes and over 100 online journals. The Department of Rare Books and Special Collections houses over 10,000 volumes which includes Catholic Americana, leaves from Bibles from the 12th through the 20th century, the Oxford Movement and manuscript letters by John Henry Newman, the Michael Novak collection, and the Terri Schiavo case. The second floor of the Canizaro Library houses the University Archives and the Canizaro Exhibit Gallery.

=== Mother Teresa Museum ===
Ave Maria University is home to a museum about the life and legacy of Mother Teresa, honored in 1979 with the Nobel Peace Prize. Artifacts include a piece of her sari, her crucifix and rosary, and letters from her and former Ave Maria University president, James Towey. The Mother Teresa Museum contains an array of items on loan from the Missionaries of Charity in Calcutta. The Missionaries of Charity also provided storyboards – in Spanish and English – that include rare photographs of Mother Teresa and tell the story of her life.

== Student life ==
Dormitories are organized into same-sex communities. There are six dorms on campus: Sebastian, Maria Goretti, St. Joseph, Xavier, and the Mega dorm, a building which contains both John Paul II and Mother Teresa dormitories. Not all dormitories are always used to house undergraduates; for example, Xavier has been used as a conference center and guest house. However, it currently serves as a girls dormitory. Opposite-sex visitors are permitted in residential common areas during the day, and in individual dorm rooms on specified evenings.

=== Liturgy ===
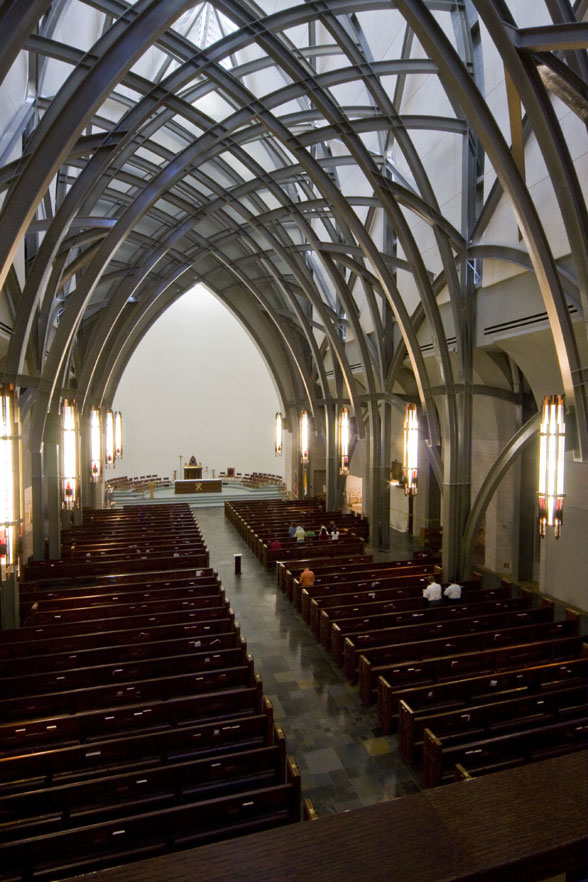
Interior of the parish church

Mass is celebrated on-campus in the Our Lady of Guadalupe Chapel and off-campus in the Ave Maria Parish Church. The parish serves both the town and the university. Originally owned by the university and called the Oratory, the building was purchased in January 2017 by the Diocese of Venice, and its status was raised to parish church. Chapels are located in each of the six dorms, each containing a tabernacle housing the Eucharist, and each but the Mega dorm containing an altar for Mass. Members of the clergy, who live on campus, assist in maintaining spiritual life. A perpetual adoration chapel was added to the Library in 2009.

Mass on campus is offered in both the Ordinary Form as well as the Extraordinary Form.

=== Student organizations ===
Until 2022, the official news publication of Ave Maria's student body was The Daily Bulletin. Recently, the Marketing department has started sending bi-weekly event reminders to students.

Campus organizations include the student activities board, student government, and more than 40 other clubs and organizations. The university also offers intramural and club sport programs.

== Athletics ==
The Ave Maria athletic teams are called the Gyrenes. The university is a member of the National Association of Intercollegiate Athletics (NAIA), primarily competing in the Sun Conference (formerly known as the Florida Sun Conference (FSC) until after the 2007–08 school year) since the 2009–10 academic year. They are also a member of the United States Collegiate Athletic Association (USCAA). The Gyrenes previously competed as an NAIA Independent within the Association of Independent Institutions (AII) during the 2008–09 school year (when the school joined the NAIA).

Ave Maria competes in 24 intercollegiate varsity sports: Men's sports include baseball, basketball, cross country, football, golf, soccer, swimming, tennis, track & field (indoor and outdoor) and ultimate frisbee; basketball, beach volleyball, cross country, dance, golf, lacrosse, soccer, softball, swimming, tennis, track & field (indoor and outdoor) and volleyball. Former sports included men's & women's rugby.

In 2011, Ave Maria became the first college in southwestern Florida to field a football team. In the spring of 2016, the Gyrenes football team joined the Mid-South Conference (MSC) as an affiliate member.

The women's lacrosse team competed in the National Women's Lacrosse League (NWLL) in their first varsity season in the spring of 2015.

== See also ==
- Ave Maria School of Law
