= Al Kresta =

American Catholic journalist (1951–2024)

Al Kresta (August 23, 1951 – June 15, 2024) was an American Catholic broadcaster, journalist, and author. Formerly an Evangelical pastor, he later became the president and CEO of Ave Maria Radio.

== Biography ==
A 1976 honors graduate of Michigan State University, Kresta has done graduate work in theology at Sacred Heart Major Seminary in Detroit and Ashland Theological Seminary.

In 1986, Kresta began pastoring Shalom Ministry in Taylor, Michigan. He became well known in the Detroit area for his program, “Talk from the Heart,” one of the top-rated Christian talk shows during the 1980s and 90s on WMUZ. When he began the program, Al was a Protestant pastor. The questions forced upon him as a pastor, however, led him to return to the Catholic Church of his upbringing. His profound personal conversion to Christ and reversion to the Catholic Church is told in the best-selling anthology Surprised By Truth.

In 1997 Domino's Pizza founder Tom Monaghan recruited him to launch the media apostolate, Ave Maria Communications. He was the host of Kresta in the Afternoon, produced by Ave Maria Radio and syndicated on EWTN Global Catholic Radio, heard on more than 350 stations around the United States, on Sirius Satellite Radio, and on numerous webstreams. Over the years, Kresta engaged in vigorous discussions and debates with many nationally known figures from politics, the arts, the Church, academia, and business.

Kresta has been a guest on BBC Radio and major TV network news affiliates. His radio work has received mention by the Associated Press, The Washington Times, National Catholic Reporter, Our Sunday Visitor, Envoy, Christianity Today, and numerous metropolitan newspapers.

Kresta's life and spiritual journey took on a new dimension in February 2003, when he lost his left leg to necrotizing fasciitis, an infection often referred to as the "flesh-eating bacteria." His extended recovery and eventual return to broadcasting gave him new insights into the realities of suffering and hope.

=== Kresta in the Afternoon ===
Kresta hosted a daily radio program on Ave Maria Radio called Kresta in the Afternoon. The program was broadcast from Ave Maria Radio's flagship station in Ann Arbor, Michigan (WDEO-AM) and syndicated across the country on the EWTN Global Catholic Radio Network.

The show originally broadcast three hours a day but was later cut to two hours. Both hours were carried by EWTN Radio until 2024 when the 4pm (eastern) hour was dropped to make way for a new program with Deacon Harold Burke-Sivers. The 4pm hour remained on Ave Maria Radio's stations in Michigan and other affiliates who received the program independently from EWTN Radio such as EPIC Radio 103.5FM in Wake Forest, North Carolina.

Kresta would write and deliver commentaries on issues facing Americans and Catholics. He would also frequently interview news-makers and authors and occasionally hosted a call-in segment called "Direct to My Desk."

During the length of the show, Kresta interviewed a wide variety of guests including the late Cardinal George Pell, jailed Hong Kong democracy activist Jimmy Lai, former US Senator Rick Santorum, former US Representative Dan Lipinski, papal biographer George Wiegel, and many more.

=== Personal life and death ===
Kresta and his wife, Sally, were married in 1977 and had five children.

Al Kresta made his Perpetual Profession as a Lay Dominican, alongside his wife Sally, in 2017 and belonged to the Bl. Pier Giorgio Frassati Fraternity in Ann Arbor, Michigan.

Kresta died of liver cancer on June 15, 2024, at the age of 72.

== Books ==
Kresta was the author of four books:

- Why Do Catholics Genuflect?: And Answers to Other Puzzling Questions About the Catholic Church, St. Anthony Messenger Press, 2001. ISBN 1569552436; ISBN 9781569552438
- Why Are Catholics So Concerned About Sin?: More Answers to Puzzling Questions About the Catholic Church, Servant Books, 2005. ISBN 0867166967, ISBN 9780867166965
- Moments of Grace: Inspiring Stories from Well-Known Catholics (with Nick Thomm), Servant Books, 2008 ISBN 0867168625; ISBN 978-0867168624
- Dangers to the Faith: Recognizing Catholicism’s 21st Century Opponents, Our Sunday Visitor, 2013 ISBN 1592767257; ISBN 978-1592767250

Kresta was also a contributor to

- Shaken By Scandal: Catholics Speak Out About Priests’ Sexual Abuse by Paul Thigpen, Charis Books, 2002. ISBN 156955353X ISBN 9781569553534

and Loving Your Neighbor (Capital Research Center).

=== Why Do Catholics Genuflect? ===
Why Do Catholic Genuflect? has made the top-10 list of Catholic books compiled by the Catholic Book Publisher's Association. It answers more than 50 common questions about Catholic religious beliefs and spiritual practices. At its release, Kresta explained that the book isn't intended to be “a definitive work of apologetics.” Rather, it is written in question-and-answer style like “a conversation that would help interested Catholics and non-Catholics better understand why Catholics believe and behave as we do.”
