= Ave Maria, Florida =

Census-designated place in Florida, United States

- unincorporated community
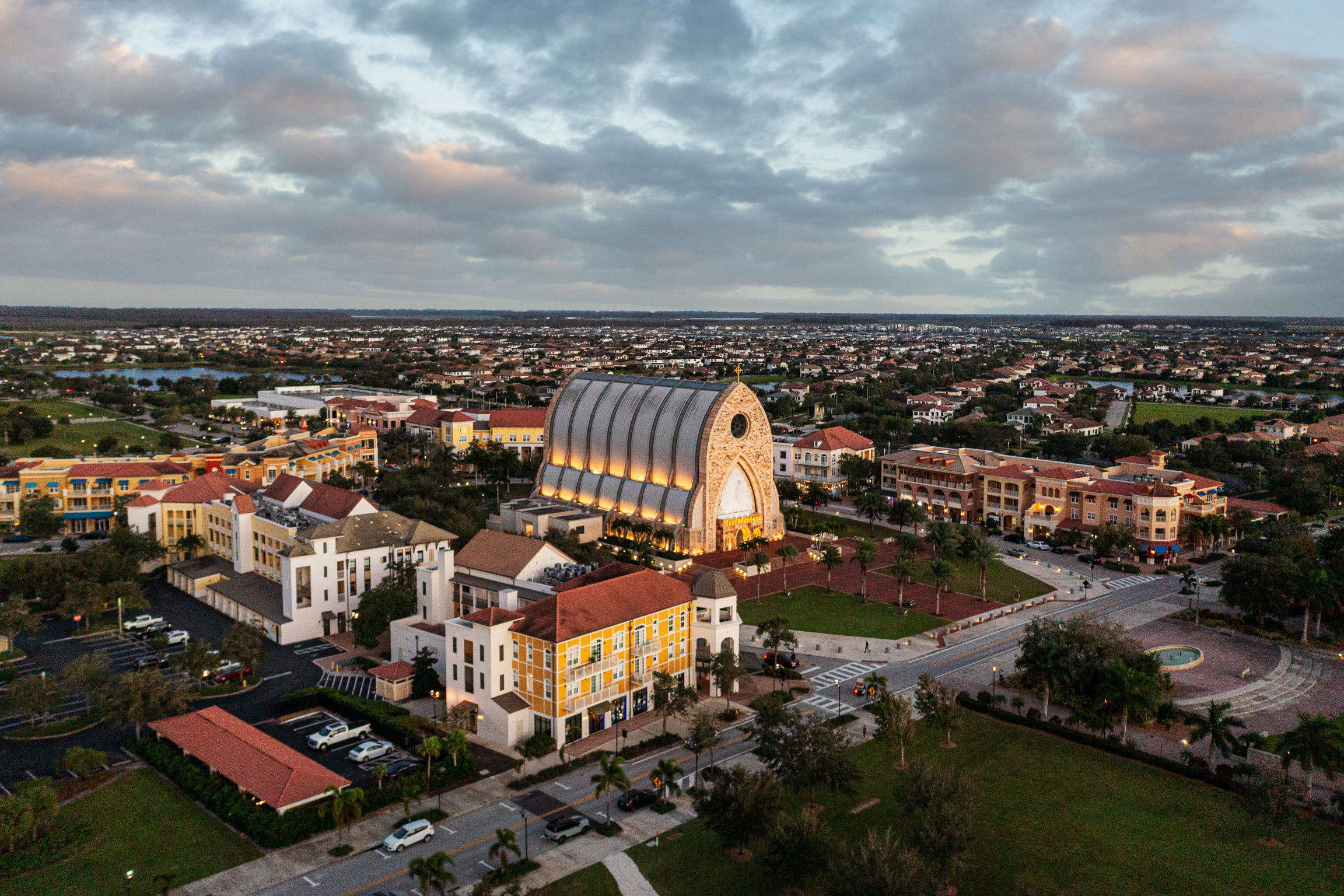

- Logo

- Location within Florida
- Coordinates: 26°19′18″N 81°26′23″W
- Country: United States
- State: Florida
- County: Collier
- Established: 2007

Government
  - Type: Stewardship Community District

Area
  - Total: 12.34 sq mi (32.0 km^{2})
- Elevation: 23 ft (7.0 m)

Population (2020)
  - Total: 6,242
  - Density: 598.6/sq mi (231.1/km^{2})
- Time zone: UTC-5 (Eastern (EST))
  - Summer (DST): UTC-4 (EDT)
- ZIP Code: 34142
- Area code: 239
- FIPS code: 12-47625
- GNIS feature ID: 2806000
- Website: Official website

Ave Maria, Florida, is a planned community and census-designated place (CDP) located in Collier County, Florida, United States, consisting of approximately 8,000 acres (3,237 ha). The population was 6,242 at the 2020 census. It is part of the Naples-Marco Island, Florida Metropolitan Statistical Area.

The community was founded in 2005 by Ave Maria Development, a partnership of Barron Collier Companies and the Ave Maria Foundation led by Roman Catholic entrepreneur Tom Monaghan, founder of Domino's Pizza and Ave Maria University, which is located in the heart of town. Along with shops and restaurants, the town square also features the Ave Maria parish church with steel arches and a 30-foot-tall marble carving of the Annunciation. As of 2023 Ave Maria was the fastest growing community in the United States that was founded in the 21st century.

== History ==
Ave Maria was founded in 2005 by Ave Maria Development, a partnership consisting of Barron Collier Companies and the Ave Maria Foundation led by Tom Monaghan, a Catholic entrepreneur and founder of Domino's Pizza and Ave Maria University. The development of the town was made possible when the Florida legislature created the Ave Maria Stewardship Community District, a limited local government whose purpose is to provide community infrastructure. The town was the first to develop under the Rural Lands Stewardship Area (RLSA) program. 2025 marked the 20th anniversary of Ave Maria's groundbreaking. Since its establishment in 2005, the community of Ave Maria has sold over 5,000 homes, resulting in the emergence of new businesses, including the Midtown Plaza, which will house various retail establishments to support local economic growth.

Monaghan's goal was for the town to be especially attractive for Catholics to move to. Many of the street names are Catholic in nature, and the center of town is anchored by a large Catholic church. During a 2007 interview, Monaghan insisted "[Ave Maria town] is open to everyone, not just Catholics". Fellowship Church is a Baptist church in Ave Maria that was founded in 2017.

In a 2007 interview with CNN, Monaghan stated that his 10-year plan was for Ave Maria to have 11,000 homes, 25,000 residents and 5,000 students at Ave Maria University. He wanted to build a community where "a particular number of Catholics, particularly serious Catholics, would want to live around a really high-quality Catholic university."

Ave Maria was ranked 18th in the US for planned community home sales in 2024.

In June 2023, Collier County commissioners approved the expansion of Ave Maria by 1,000 acres. This brought the town's size to 5,000 acres, which is the largest allowed under the county rules. The Ave Maria University campus is not included in this acreage. The new land will be used mainly for single family homes, as well as a new town center and additional retail sites.

Ave Maria experienced a surge in new businesses in 2024, particularly within the Midtown Plaza development, adding diverse dining and retail options for residents. This commercial growth was implemented due to strong residential sales and planned expansion, including new healthcare and restaurant offerings. Future development is anticipated with available out-parcels and a rezoned area near the town's entrance, promising continued commercial growth alongside the increasing population.

It was announced in October 2024 that the master-planned community in Collier County is expanding commercially with Midtown Plaza. This growth reflects the increasing population of Ave Maria and Collier County, providing convenient amenities and reinforcing the community's family-oriented focus.

In 2026, an expansion of 2,042 acres was approved for Ave Maria increasing the town's size to 7,970 acres. The expansion includes an additional 1 million square feet of commercial and medical space.

== Education ==
Ave Maria is located in Collier County, and residents attend Collier County public or private schools, some of which are located in the town.

=== Ave Maria University ===
Ave Maria University opened on a temporary campus in 2003. Construction of the permanent campus began in 2005, and students were first welcomed in 2007. Ave Maria University is home to the Mother Teresa Museum. In 2026, Florida Governor Ron DeSantis was selected to deliver the commencement address at Ave Maria University’s graduation ceremony.

=== K-12 schools ===
Public schools

Collier County Public Schools operates public schools.

- Estates Elementary School
- Corkscrew Middle School
- Palmetto Ridge High School

Ave Maria Elementary School is the first on-site public elementary school in Ave Maria. Construction began in 2025 with completion scheduled for August 2026 and will open for the 2026–2027 school year.

Private schools

- The Palm Preschool
- Rhodora J. Donahue Academy (K-12)
- K-12 Fellowship Academy

== Geography and climate ==
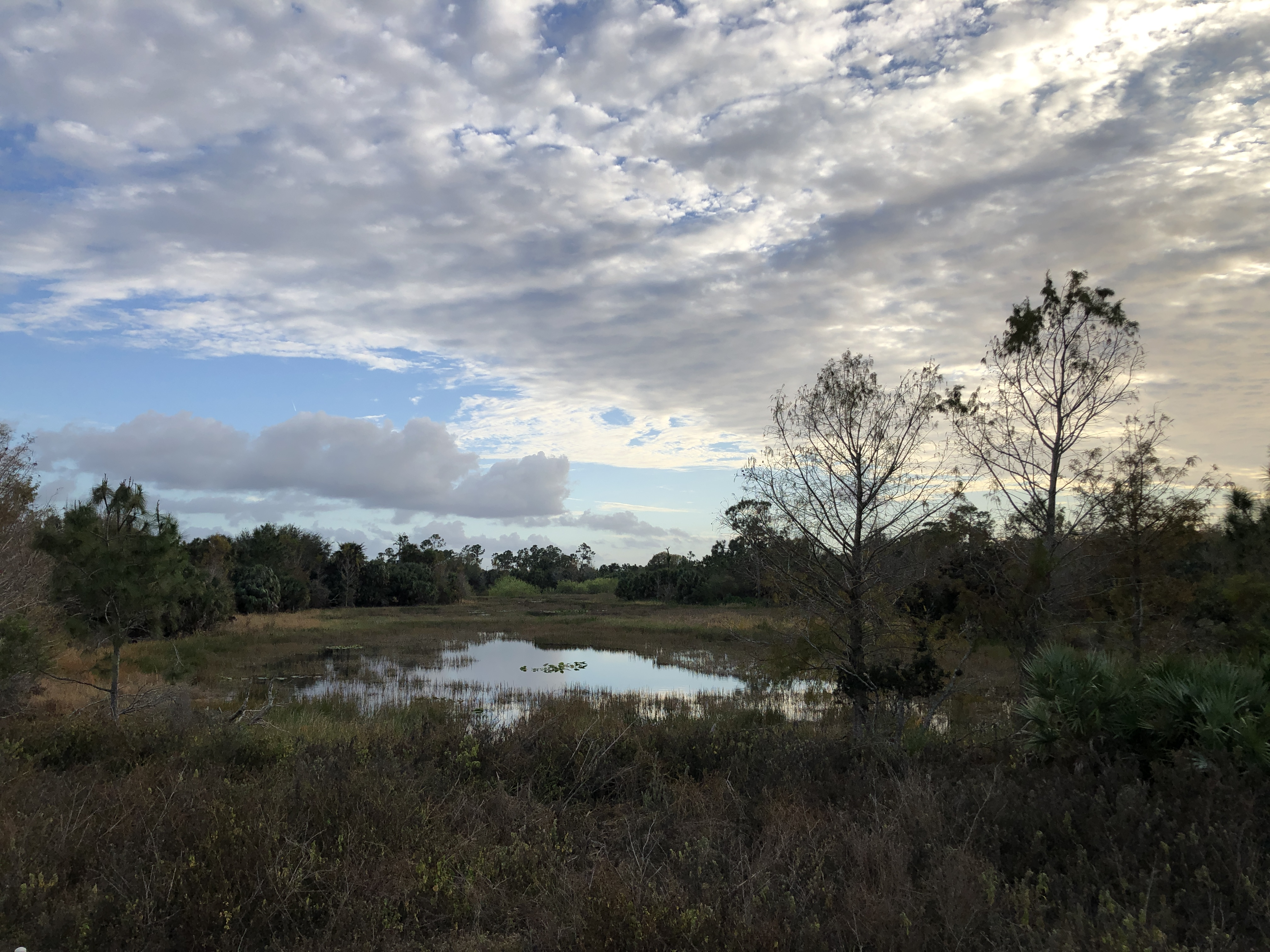
A nature preserve in Ave Maria

Ave Maria is 36 miles northeast of downtown Naples, Florida, and part of Collier County. The town's elevation is 23 feet. According to the United States Census Bureau, the city has a total area of 10.42 sq mi (27.0 km^{2}).

Ave Maria has a tropical savanna climate (Köppen climate classification Aw).

The temperature rarely rises to 100 °F (38 °C) or lowers to the freezing mark. Rainfall averages just over 23.13 inches per year, strongly concentrated during the rainy season (June to September) with its frequent showers and thunderstorms; on average, these four months deliver 80 percent of annual rainfall. From October to May, the average monthly rainfall is less than 1.9 inches. The monthly daily average temperature ranges from 66 °F (18.9 °C) in January to 83 °F (28.3 °C) in August, with the annual mean being 74.5 °F (23.6 °C).

=== Ecology ===
Ave Maria's location in southern Florida shares the same subtropical wetland ecosystem as the Florida Everglades. It is home to a diversity of birds such as wood storks, anhinga, heron and hawks. Alligators may be encountered near fresh water. Visitors have access to a number of nearby nature centers, including the undeveloped wetlands of Camp Keais Strand, Rookery Bay National Estuarine Research Reserve, the Everglades, and Corkscrew Swamp Sanctuary and Blair Audubon Center. According to the Collier Mosquito Control District (CMCD), this wetlands region of Southwest Florida is a habitat for mansonia mosquitoes, so to control diseases such as West Nile virus, CMCD aircraft containing naled spray the area regularly.

Since the founding of Ave Maria, Florida, the total trihalomethane (TTHMs) levels have decreased and are below legal limits for contaminants, as seen in 2023 and 2024 reports. Ave Maria Utility Company (AMUC) was awarded Best Tasting Drinking Water by the Florida Section of the American Water Works Association– Region V (FSAWWA) in 2010, 2014, and 2021.

== Demographics ==
Historical population
Census	Pop.	Note	%±
2020	6,242		—
U.S. Decennial Census

Ave Maria first appeared as a census designated place in the 2020 U.S. census.

=== 2020 census ===
As of the 2020 census, Ave Maria had a population of 6,242. The median age was 35.6 years. 23.1% of residents were under the age of 18 and 19.9% were 65 years of age or older. For every 100 females, there were 92.3 males, and for every 100 females age 18 and over, there were 90.3 males age 18 and over.

0.0% of residents lived in urban areas, while 100.0% lived in rural areas.

There were 1,879 households in Ave Maria, of which 33.2% had children under the age of 18 living in them. Of all households, 67.9% were married-couple households, 10.4% were households with a male householder and no spouse or partner present, and 17.1% were households with a female householder and no spouse or partner present. About 16.6% of all households were made up of individuals, and 9.1% had someone living alone who was 65 years of age or older. There were 806 families.

There were 2,227 housing units, of which 15.6% were vacant. The homeowner vacancy rate was 4.5%, and the rental vacancy rate was 14.4%.

Racial composition as of the 2020 census
Race	Number	Percent
White	3,959	63.4%
Black or African American	593	9.5%
American Indian and Alaska Native	38	0.6%
Asian	162	2.6%
Native Hawaiian and Other Pacific Islander	3	0.0%
Some other race	464	7.4%
Two or more races	1,023	16.4%
Hispanic or Latino (of any race)	1,779	28.5%

== Commerce ==
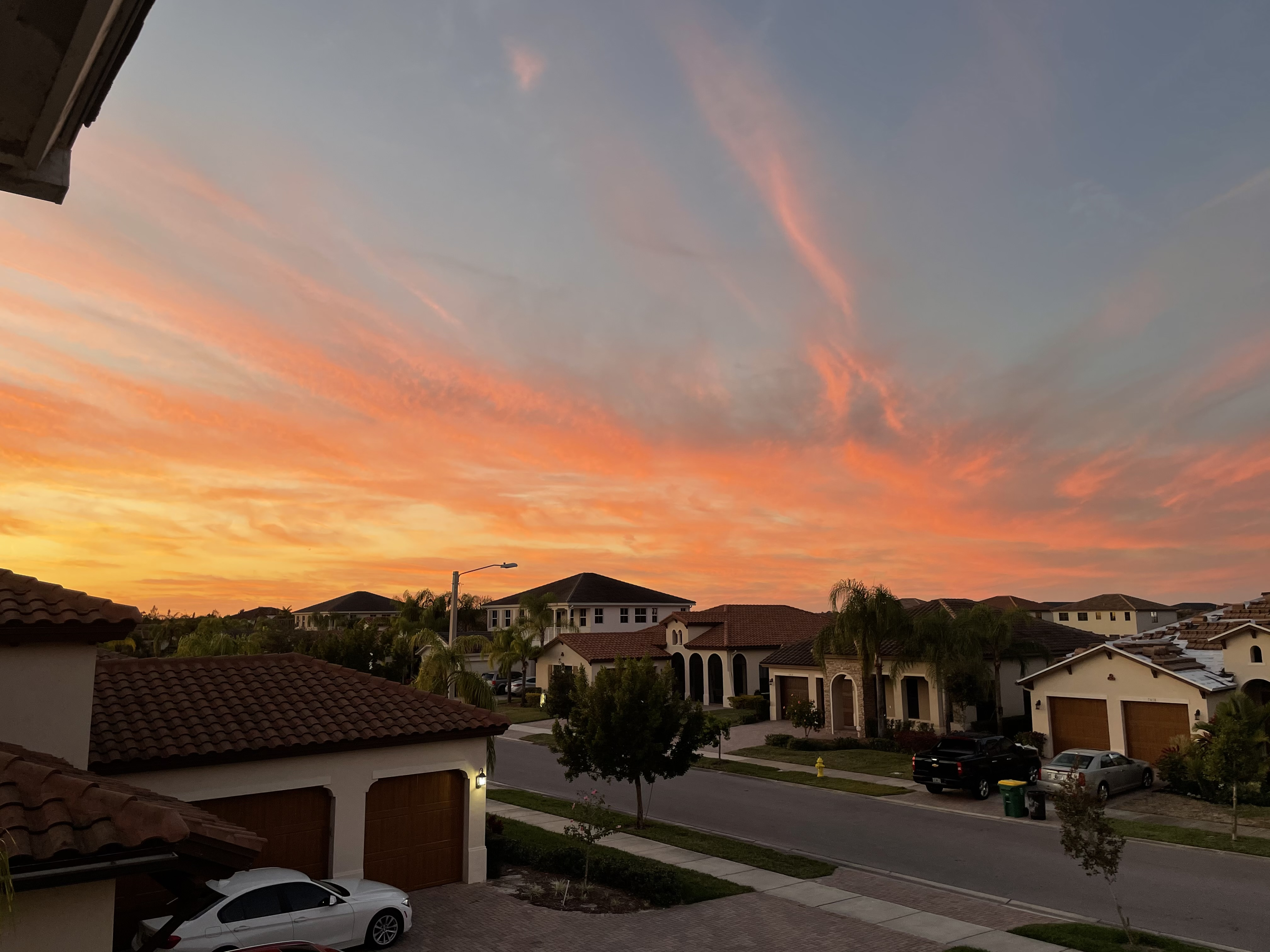
A residential street in Ave Maria

Ave Maria is home to over 60 businesses, a water park, recreational parks, an indoor marketplace with local vendors, an amphitheater, dog park, trails, playgrounds, bocce and tennis courts, and a fitness center. The main Ave Maria Town Center has an open-air walkable design and covers 100,000 square feet.

Ave Maria has condominiums, attached villas, and single family homes, with plans for a 300-unit apartment complex announced in 2023. In 2025, Ave Maria ranked 20th in the United States for new home sales among master-planned communities.

In February 2025, thousands of attendees enjoyed food and beverages from the Town Center businesses at the annual Blues Brews and BBQ Festival.

In April 2025, it was announced that Naples Comprehensive Health is collaborating with Barron Collier Companies to provide more medical services in town, including an Immediate Care Clinic and a freestanding 24-hour emergency room. In October 2025, it was confirmed that NCH has a 10-year, 4-phase plan for a 150-bed hospital for Ave Maria to be built on 18 acres of land donated by Barron Collier Companies. Phase one is scheduled to begin in May 2027 with the construction of the freestanding emergency room, medical offices, and imaging services with a planned opening in November 2028.

== Ave Maria parish ==
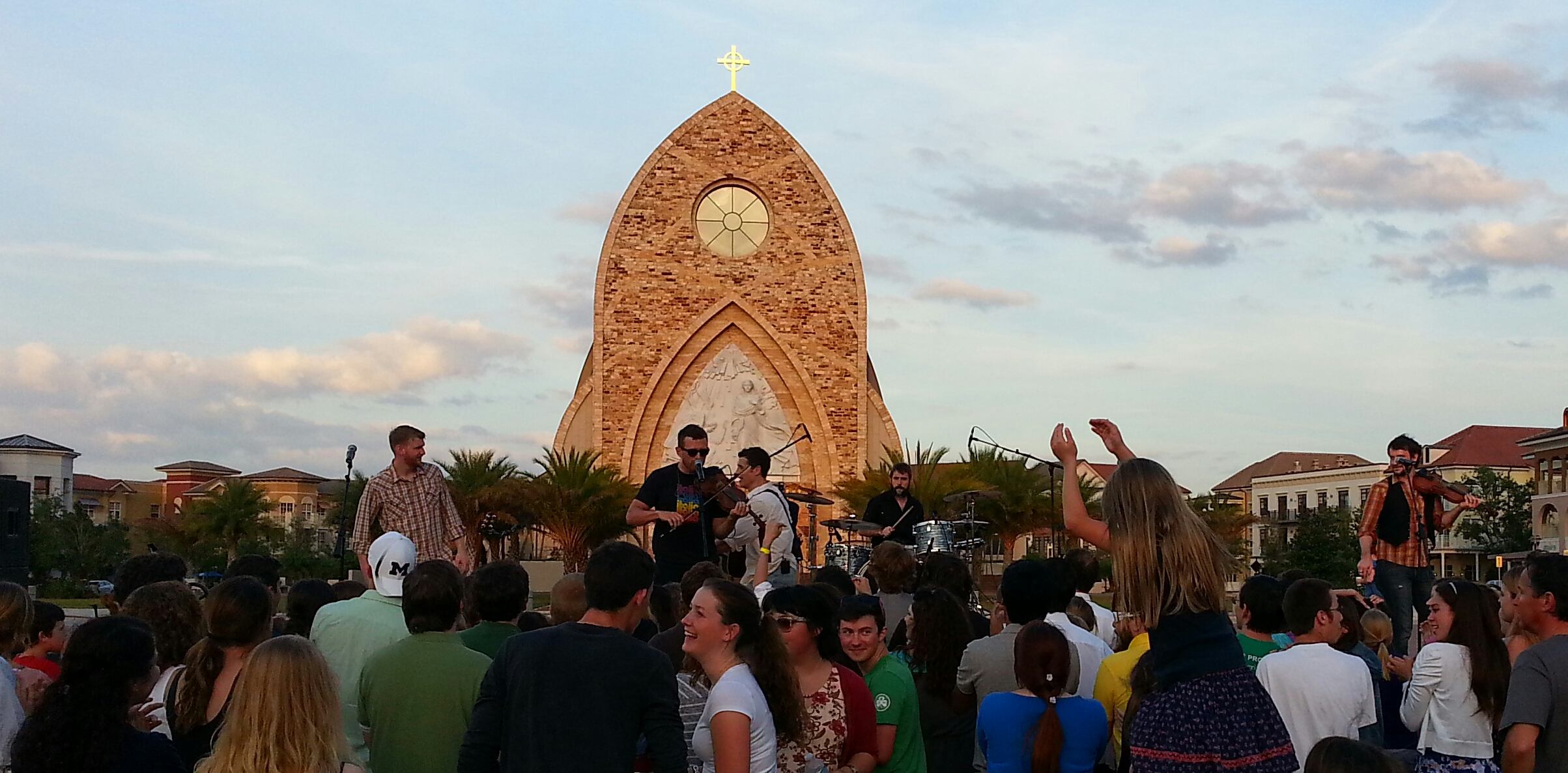
The band Scythian performs at a festival in front of the Ave Maria Oratory with Annunciation sculpture visible in the background

The face of the church displays sculptor Márton Váró's 30-foot-tall (9 m) sculpture of the Annunciation, depicting the Archangel Gabriel greeting the Virgin Mary with the words Ave Maria (Hail Mary). It took Váró three years to complete the sculpture. Váró's "Good Shepherd" sculpture is featured inside the church; it was also carved in marble from Cave Michelangelo in Carrara, Italy.

The church is part of the Diocese of Venice, and serves as the parish for local residents, students, and visitors. One of the building's most distinctive characteristics is its steel structure, much of which is exposed internally and externally. In 2008, the parish received an Innovative Design in Engineering and Architecture with Structural Steel award from the American Institute of Steel Construction. A reward was also given by the American Institute of Architects. Tours of the church are available to the public.
